= Sosioceras =

Sosioceras Temporal range: Late Permian

Scientific classification
- Domain: Eukaryota
- Kingdom: Animalia
- Phylum: Mollusca
- Class: Cephalopoda
- Subclass: †Ammonoidea
- Order: †Goniatitida
- Family: †Pseudohaloritidae
- Subfamily: †Shouchangoceratinae
- Genus: †Sosioceras; Frest, Glenister & Furnish, 1981

Genus of molluscs (fossil)

Sosioceras is an Upper Permian shouchangoceratin pseudohaloritid characterized by a subdiscoidal shell, about 2 cm in diameter, marked by growth lines, as with Neoaganides, and having a mature peristome with a double constriction near the periphery. The suture also closely resembles that of Neoaganides.

Sosioceras is found in the Upper Permian Sosio limestone of Sosio valley, in Sicily, first described by Gemmellaro, 1880, as Brancoceras pygmaeum, thought be a rare element of the Sosio fauna. Miller and Furnish, 1957, redefined it as Neoaganides pygmaeum (Gemmellero) on the basis of close similarity of size, form, and suture to Neoaganides grahamensis. Based on features of the peristome and recognition of a wrinkle layer, unique in this family, Frest et al., 1981, renamed the genus Sosioceras, in reference to its location, arguing for its separation. The type and only species is Sosioceras pygmaeum (Gemmellero, 1880).
