= Adrianitinae =

Adrianitinae Temporal range: Lower Permian–Middle Permian

Scientific classification
- Kingdom: Animalia
- Phylum: Mollusca
- Class: Cephalopoda
- Subclass: †Ammonoidea
- Order: †Goniatitida
- Family: †Adrianitidae
- Subfamily: †Adrianitinae; Schindewolf 1931

Genera
- See text

Extinct subfamily of molluscs

Adrianitinae is a subfamily of the Adrianitidae which is part of the goniatitid superfamily Adrianitoidea. The Adrianitinae which comprise the more advanced genera in the Adrianitidae have sutures that form 14 to 30 lobes. Shells may be discoidal or globular or in between.

== Taxonomy ==
The Adriantinae which are found widespread in lower and middle Permian marine sediments are derived from Crimites, a genus in the more primitive Emilitinae subfamily, through Neocrimites which gave rise to Adrianites, Epadrianites, Pseudagathiceras, and Sosiocrimites (Saunders et al. 1999).

In the older taxonomy of Miller et al.,(1960), the Adrianitinae consists of Adrianites, Hoffmannia, Doryceras, Crimites, and Texoceras. Hoffmannia and Texoceras are each now their own subfamily, Hoffmanniinae and Texoceratinae respectively. Doryceras and Crimites are removed from the Adrianitinae and placed in the Emilitinae (sometimes given as Emiliidae).

Epadrianites, Metaricoceras, Neocrimites and Sosiocrimites, which were considered possible equivalents of Adrianites in Miller et al., are distinguished separately in what is now the Adrianitinae. Pseudagathiceras, once thought a possible equivalent of Doryceras, has been added.

Neocrimites is the most primitive of the Adrianitinae and is the source (Saunders et al. 1999) for Adrianites, Epadrianites, Pseudagathiceras, and Sosiocrimites.

Adrianites and related genera are found widespread in the middle Permian, especially from Sicily and Texas.

== Genera ==
- Adrianites
- Aricoceras (syn. Metaricoceras)
- Crimites (syn. Istycoceras)
- Doryceras
- Emilites
- Epadrianites
- Metaricoceras
- Neoaricoceras
- Neocrimites (Syn. Metacrimites)
- Nevadoceras
- Palermites
- Pamiritella
- Pseudagathiceras
- Pseudoemilites
- Sizilites
- Sosiocrimites
- Veruzhites
