= Aristoceras =

Aristoceras Temporal range: Early Pennsylvanian - Early Permian

Scientific classification
- Domain: Eukaryota
- Kingdom: Animalia
- Phylum: Mollusca
- Class: Cephalopoda
- Subclass: †Ammonoidea
- Order: †Goniatitida
- Family: †Thalassoceratidae
- Subfamily: †Thalassoceratinae
- Genus: †Aristoceras; Ruzencev,1950

Species
- See text

Extinct genus of molluscs

Aristoceras is a Late Paleozoic goniatitid genus included in the Goniatitina suborder in which the lobes of the external suture are irregularly serrate.

Aristoceras, named by Ruzencev, 1950, may be a synonym for Euthalassoceras Miller and Furnish, 1940. The family to which it belongs, the Thalassoceratidae is now part of the Thalassoceratoidea, but used to be included in the Dimorphocerataceae with the Dimorphoceratidae.
