= Gemmellaro =

Gemmellaro is a surname. Notable people with the surname include:

- Carlo Gemmellaro (1787–1866), Italian naturalist and geologist
- Gaetano Giorgio Gemmellaro (1832–1904), Italian geologist, paleontologist, and politician
