= Shouchangoceras =

Shouchangoceras Temporal range: Late Permian

Scientific classification
- Kingdom: Animalia
- Phylum: Mollusca
- Class: Cephalopoda
- Subclass: †Ammonoidea
- Order: †Goniatitida
- Family: †Pseudohaloritidae
- Subfamily: †Shouchangoceratinae
- Genus: †Shouchangoceras; Zhao & Zheng, 1977

Extinct genus of molluscs

Shouchangoceras is a genus of goniatitid pseudohaloritid ammonoids and is the type genus for the pseudohaloritid subfamily Shouchangoceratinae. The genus is characterized by a compressed shell as much as 5 cm in diameter, with a strongly constricted mature peristome that has shallow dorsolateral sinus, a moderately deep rounded ventral sinus, but without conspicuous lappets, and ornamented by moderately strong transverse ribs and numerous stronger longitudinal lirae, producing a weakly reticulate pattern. Lobes are attenuate. The siphuncle is within the dorsal septal flecture.

Shouchangoceras is known from the Upper Permian of Texas and south China. It is the only genus named and described by Zhao & Zheng known also from North America.

Shouchangoceras resembles both Shangraoceras and Sangzhites in ornament, all three of which possess transverse ribs and longitudinal lirae. In Shouchangoceras both are moderately developed. In Shangraoceras lirae are fine, if found at all, while ribs are course. In Sangzhites both ribs and lirae and strongly developed.
