= Adrianites =

Scientific classification
- Domain: Eukaryota
- Kingdom: Animalia
- Phylum: Mollusca
- Class: Cephalopoda
- Subclass: †Ammonoidea
- Order: †Goniatitida
- Family: †Adrianitidae
- Subfamily: †Adrianitinae
- Genus: †Adrianites; Gemmellaro, 1887

Species
- A. elegans

Extinct genus of molluscs

Adrianites is an extinct genus of the Adrianitidae family. They are an extinct group of ammonoid, which are shelled cephalopods related to squids, belemnites, octopodes, and cuttlefish, and more distantly to the nautiloids.
