= Yinoceras =

Yinoceras Temporal range: Middle Permian

Scientific classification
- Domain: Eukaryota
- Kingdom: Animalia
- Phylum: Mollusca
- Class: Cephalopoda
- Subclass: †Ammonoidea
- Order: †Goniatitida
- Family: †Pseudohaloritidae
- Subfamily: †Yinoceratinae
- Genus: †Yinoceras; Zhao 1954

Genus of molluscs (fossil)

Yinoceras is a genus of middle Permian goniatitid ammonite, the type genus for the subfamily Yinoceratinae of the family Pseudohaloritidae.

The shell of Yinoceras is involute, small to intermediate in size, subglobular or thickly discoidal with a very small umbilicus, convex flanks, and rounded venter. The surface is usually marked by weak constrictions and is characterized at maturity by coarse transverse ribs that bifurcate or sometimes trifurcate. The siphuncle is proportionally large and retrochoanitic (meaning the septal necks point toward the beginning of the shell); ventro-marginal in the first whorl but then migrates rapidly to become dorsal. The suture is goniatitic.

The retrochoanitic siphuncle is more usual for earlier, Devonian, ammonoids and is a characteristic of the Nautiloidea. The dorsal siphuncle, characteristic of the Upper Devonian Clymeniida may say something about the orientation of Yinoceras during life.
