= Almites =

Scientific classification
- Kingdom: Animalia
- Phylum: Mollusca
- Class: Cephalopoda
- Subclass: †Ammonoidea
- Order: †Goniatitida
- Family: †Marathonitidae
- Subfamily: †Marathonitinae
- Genus: †Almites; Toumansky 1941

Genus of molluscs (fossil)

Almites is a genus belonging to the Marathonitidae families. They are an extinct group of ammonoids, which are shelled cephalopods related to squids, belemnites, octopuses, and cuttlefish, and more distantly to the nautiloids.
