= Angranoceras =

Angranoceras Temporal range: Guadalupian

Scientific classification
- Domain: Eukaryota
- Kingdom: Animalia
- Phylum: Mollusca
- Class: Cephalopoda
- Subclass: †Ammonoidea
- Order: †Goniatitida
- Family: †Mongoloceratidae
- Genus: †Angranoceras; Sheng 1988

Species
- None cataloged

Genus of molluscs (fossil)

Angranoceras is an extinct genus of cephalopod belonging to the Ammonite subclass.

== Distribution ==
None cataloged
