= Aristoceratoides =

Aristoceratoides Temporal range: Wordian

Scientific classification
- Domain: Eukaryota
- Kingdom: Animalia
- Phylum: Mollusca
- Class: Cephalopoda
- Subclass: †Ammonoidea
- Order: †Goniatitida
- Family: †Thalassoceratidae
- Subfamily: †Thalassoceratinae
- Genus: †Aristoceratoides; Ruzhentsev, 1960

Species
- See Text

Extinct genus of molluscs

Aristoceratoides is an extinct ammonoid genus belonging to the goniatitid family Thalassoceratidae that lived during the Middle Permian. Named by Ruzhentsev, 1960, the type species is "Thalassoceras" varicosum Gemmellaro, 1887.

The shell of Aristoceratoides is globose, with ventrolateral furrows; whorls wider than high. The suture is simpler than that of its likely ancestor Aristoceras. Suture elements are simply digitate with digits restricted to the lower half of lobes.
