= Asturoceras =

Scientific classification
- Domain: Eukaryota
- Kingdom: Animalia
- Phylum: Mollusca
- Class: Cephalopoda
- Subclass: †Ammonoidea
- Order: †Goniatitida
- Family: †Dimorphoceratidae
- Subfamily: †Dimorphoceratinae
- Genus: †Asturoceras; Ruzhencev & Bogoslovskaya, 1969

Type species
- Trizonoceras subdivisum Kullmann, 1962

Species
- Asturoceras subdivisum Kullmann, 1962; Asturoceras romanum Riley, 1985

Genus of molluscs (fossil)

Asturoceras is an extinct late Paleozoic ammonoid cephalopod genus belonging to the Goniatitida, named by Ruzhencev and Bogoslovskaya in 1969.

As for its family, the Dimorphoceratidae, the shell of Asturoceras is completely involute, with a closed umbilicus, and the ventral lobe becomes extremely wide during growth by subdivision. In Asturoceras at maturity the ventral lobe has six bifid branches.

Fossils of this genus were found in Spain and England.

== Related genera ==
- Dimorphoceras
- Trizonoceras
