= Neoglaphyrites =

Neoglaphyrites Temporal range: Late Pennsylvanian - Early Permian

Scientific classification
- Domain: Eukaryota
- Kingdom: Animalia
- Phylum: Mollusca
- Class: Cephalopoda
- Subclass: †Ammonoidea
- Order: †Goniatitida
- Family: †Bisatoceratidae
- Genus: †Neoglaphyrites; Ruzhensev, 1938

Species
- See text

Extinct genus of ammonites

Neoglaphyrites is a goniatitid ammonite that lived during the latest Pennsylvanian and early Permian. Its shell is ellipsoidal and moderately involute; the umbilicus deep and typically less than 15 per cent of the shell diameter but in some species closer to 20 per cent. Delicate growth lines forming ventral and lateral sinuses and ventrolateral and dorsolateral salients have been found on Canadian Arctic specimens. The suture is characterized by the ventral lobe split into two broad prongs that are separated by a high median ventral saddle; prongs closely approximate the width of the first lateral lobe. The first lateral saddle is evenly rounded and is nearly symmetrical. The umbilical lobe is V-shaped and internal lobes are deep and narrow.

General consensus is that Neoglaphyrites belongs in the Bisatoceratidae, although this has not always been the case. Miller et al 1957, in the Treatise on Invertebrate Paleontology, placed Neoglaphyrites in the Neoicoceratidae as a synonym for Eoasianites. Saunders 1999 is uncertain which family to include Neoglaphyrites in, but includes it in the Somoholotaceae.
