= Emilitinae =

Scientific classification
- Kingdom: Animalia
- Phylum: Mollusca
- Class: Cephalopoda
- Order: Goniatitida
- Family: Adrianitidae
- Subfamily: Emilitinae Leonova and Bogoslovskaya, 1990

Genera
- Aricoceras; Crimites; Emilites; Istycoceras; Metacrimites; Nevadoceras; Pseudoemilites; Veruzhites

Extinct subfamily of molluscs

Emilitinae is a subfamily based on the genus Emilites, proposed by Leonova and Bogoslovskaya, 1990, for the most primitive members of the Adrianitidae, but no longer generally recognized as an independent taxon. Emilites and the other genera listed in the Emilitinae have been reassigned to the Adrianitinae where they were previously found.

These are part of an extinct group of shelled cephalopods known as ammonoids, which are more closely related to squids, belemnites, octopuses, and cuttlefish than to the nautiloids from which they are derived.
