= Shouchangoceratinae =

Shouchangoceratinae Temporal range: Permian

Scientific classification
- Kingdom: Animalia
- Phylum: Mollusca
- Class: Cephalopoda
- Subclass: †Ammonoidea
- Order: †Goniatitida
- Family: †Pseudohaloritidae
- Subfamily: †Shouchangoceratinae; Zhao and Zheng 1977

Genera
- Aulacaganides; Elephantoceras; Erinoceras; Lianyuanoceras; Neoaganides; Qinglongites; Sangzhites; Shangraoceras; Shouchangoceras; Sosioceras

Extinct subfamily of molluscs

Shouchangoceratinae is one of three ammonoid subfamilies of the family Pseudohaloritidae, which in turn is one of two families in the Goniatitid superfamily Pseudohaloritoidea. The Shouchangoceratinid ammonoids were found in marine environments throughout the world during the Permian, particularly in China.
