= Anthracoceratites =

Scientific classification
- Kingdom: Animalia
- Phylum: Mollusca
- Class: Cephalopoda
- Subclass: †Ammonoidea
- Order: †Goniatitida
- Family: †Dimorphoceratidae
- Subfamily: †Glyphiolobinae
- Genus: †Anthracoceratites

Genus of molluscs (fossil)

Anthracoceratites is an extinct genus of the Dimorphoceratidae family. They are an extinct group of ammonoid, which are shelled cephalopods related to squids, belemnites, octopuses, and cuttlefish, and more distantly to the nautiloids.

== Bibliography ==
- The Paleobiology Database accessed on 10/01/07
