= Aulacaganides =

Aulacaganides Temporal range: Roadian

Scientific classification
- Domain: Eukaryota
- Kingdom: Animalia
- Phylum: Mollusca
- Class: Cephalopoda
- Subclass: †Ammonoidea
- Order: †Goniatitida
- Family: †Pseudohaloritidae
- Subfamily: †Shouchangoceratinae
- Genus: †Aulacaganides; Zhou, 1985

Type species
- Aulacaganides hunanicus Zhou, 1985

Species
- A. hunanicus Zhou, 1985

Extinct genus of ammonites

Aulacaganides is monospecific genus of a Middle Permian ammonite belonging to the goniatitid family Pseudohaloritidae. Fossils belonging to this genera were found in Hunan province of China.

This genus has small, involute and thickly discoidal shell with central siphuncle. Venter is rounded with gently convex lateral sides and has ventrolateral sulcus on each side. Growth lines and constrictions are forming a sinus on the venter. Suture is goniatitic and has long narrow ventral lobes, while lateral lobes are deeply pointed. It is similar to Neoganides, with which it shares shape of shell and suture. Differences are in ventrolateral sulcus, which is on each side and external lateral lobes are more pointed and deeper in the case of Aulacaganides.
