= Elephantoceras =

Elephantoceras Temporal range: Wordian

Scientific classification
- Domain: Eukaryota
- Kingdom: Animalia
- Phylum: Mollusca
- Class: Cephalopoda
- Subclass: †Ammonoidea
- Order: †Goniatitida
- Family: †Pseudohaloritidae
- Subfamily: †Shouchangoceratinae
- Genus: †Elephantoceras; Zhao & Zheng, 1977

Type species
- Elephantoceras spinonodosum Zhao & Zheng, 1977

Species
- E. nodosum Zhao & Zheng, 1977; E. spinonodosum Zhao & Zheng, 1977

Extinct genus of ammonites

Elephantoceras is genus of a Middle Permian ammonite belonging to the goniatitid family Pseudohaloritidae. Fossils belonging to this genus were found in China.
