= Popanoceratoidea =

Scientific classification
- Domain: Eukaryota
- Kingdom: Animalia
- Phylum: Mollusca
- Class: Cephalopoda
- Subclass: †Ammonoidea
- Order: †Goniatitida
- Suborder: †Goniatitina
- Superfamily: †Popanoceratoidea; Hyatt 1900

Families
- Mongoloceratidae; Popanoceratidae

Synonyms
- Popanocerataceae

Extinct superfamily of molluscs

Popanoceratoidea is one of seventeen superfamilies of the Goniatitina suborder. They are an extinct group of ammonoid, which are shelled cephalopods related to squids, belemnites, octopuses, and cuttlefish, and more distantly to the nautiloids.
