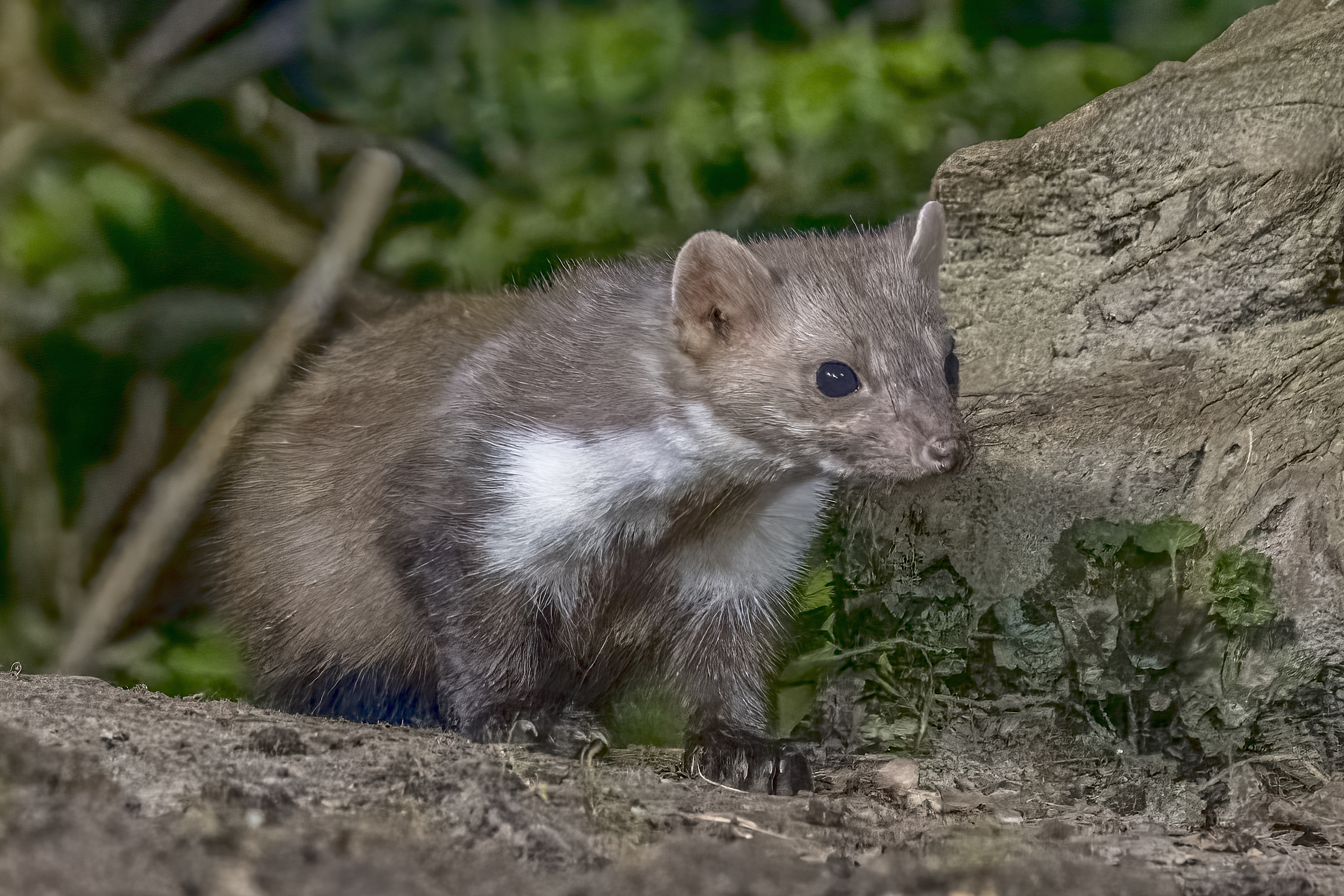
- Martes foina foina, Netherlands

Conservation status
- Least Concern (IUCN 3.1)

Scientific classification
- Kingdom: Animalia
- Phylum: Chordata
- Class: Mammalia
- Order: Carnivora
- Family: Mustelidae
- Genus: Martes
- Species: M. foina

Binomial name
- Martes foina (Erxleben, 1777)
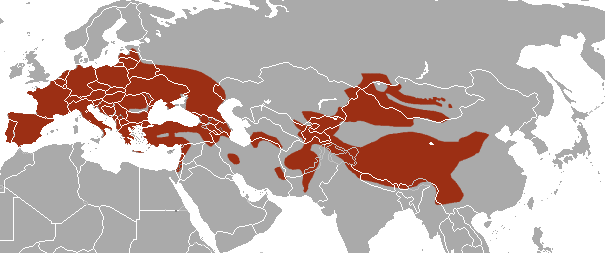
- Beech marten native range

= Beech marten =

Species of carnivore

The beech marten (Martes foina), also known as the stone marten, house marten or white breasted marten, is a species of marten native to much of Europe and Central Asia, though it has established a feral population in North America. It is listed as Least Concern on the IUCN Red List on account of its wide distribution, its large population, and its presence in a number of protected areas. It is superficially similar to the European pine marten, but differs from it by its smaller size and habitat preferences. While the pine marten is a forest specialist, the beech marten is a more generalist and adaptable species, occurring in a number of open and forest habitats.

== Evolution ==
Its most likely ancestor is Martes vetus, which also gave rise to the pine marten. The earliest M. vetus fossils were found in deposits dated to the Würm glaciation in Lebanon and Israel. The beech marten likely originated in the Near East or southwestern Asia, and may have arrived in Europe by the Late Pleistocene or the early Holocene. Thus, the beech marten differs from most other European mustelids of the Quaternary, as all other species (save for the European mink) appeared during the Middle Pleistocene. Comparisons between fossil animals and their descendants indicate that the beech marten underwent a decrease in size beginning in the Würm period. Beech martens indigenous to the Aegean Islands represent a relic population with primitive Asiatic affinities.

The skull of the beech marten suggests a higher adaptation than the pine marten toward hypercarnivory, as indicated by its smaller head, shorter snout and its narrower post-orbital constriction and lesser emphasis on cheek teeth. Selective pressures must have acted to increase the beech marten's bite force at the expense of gape. These traits probably acted on male beech martens as a mechanism to avoid both intraspecific competition with females and interspecific competition with the ecologically overlapping pine marten.

=== Subspecies ===
As of 2005, eleven subspecies are recognised.

Subspecies	Trinomial authority	Description	Range	Synonyms
European beech marten M. f. foina (Nominate subspecies)	Erxleben, 1777	A small subspecies, with an average-sized skull. In winter, its back varies from light greyish tawny to completely dark brown. The guard hairs are tawny or chestnut brown, while the underfur is very light, pale-grey. The flanks and withers are slightly lighter than the back, and the belly darker. The legs are dark brown and the throat patch pure white. The patch is variable in size and shape.	European Russia, Western Europe (except the Balkan Peninsula) and the Iberian Peninsula	alba (Bechstein, 1801) domestica (Pinel, 1792) fagorum (Fatio, 1869)
Balkan beech marten M. f. bosniaca	Brass, 1911		Balkan Peninsula	
Cretan beech marten M. f. bunites	Bate, 1906	A smaller subspecies than foina, with a less defined throat patch, which may be absent in some specimens.	Crete, Skopelos, Naxos, Erimomilos, Karpathos, Samothrake, Seriphos and Kythnos	
Middle Asian beech marten M. f. intermedia	Severtzov, 1873	A smaller subspecies than nehringi, with lighter fur. The back is moderately dark greyish-tawny. The flanks are lighter, but of the same tone as the back. The guard hairs are dark-tawny, while the underfur is almost white. The tail is dark brown. The throat patch is very variable, being sometimes completely undefined.	Montane Middle Asia, from Kopet Dag and Bolshoi Balkhas to Tarbagatai (in the Khangai Mountains) and Altai. Outside the former Soviet Union, its range includes northern Iran, Afghanistan, western Pakistan, western Himalayas, Tien Shan, Tibet and northern Mongolia	altaica (Satunin, 1914) leucolachnaea (Blanford, 1879)
Tibetan beech marten M. f. kozlovi	Ognev, 1931		Eastern Tibet	
Iberian beech marten M. f. mediterranea	Barrett-Hamilton, 1898.	A lighter, less drab coloured form than foina.	Iberian Peninsula	
Rhodes beech marten M. f. milleri	Festa, 1914		Rhodes	
Caucasian beech marten M. f. nehringi	Satunin, 1906	A large subspecies with a massive skull. The winter coat is quite dark, brownish-tawny or dark tawny with a greyish tint. The flanks are lighter than the back, and the tail and feet are dark brown. The throat patch varies in form and size, but shows a tendency towards reduction.	Caucasus and contiguous parts of Turkey and Iran	
Crimean beech marten M. f. rosanowi	Martino and Martino, 1917	A smaller subspecies than foina, but with near identical colours.	Montane Crimea	
Syrian beech marten M. f. syriaca	Nehring, 1902	A pale coloured subspecies with a smaller skull than the nominative form	Syria	
Lhasa beech marten M. f. toufoeus	Hodgson, 1842		Lhasa, Tibet	

== Description ==
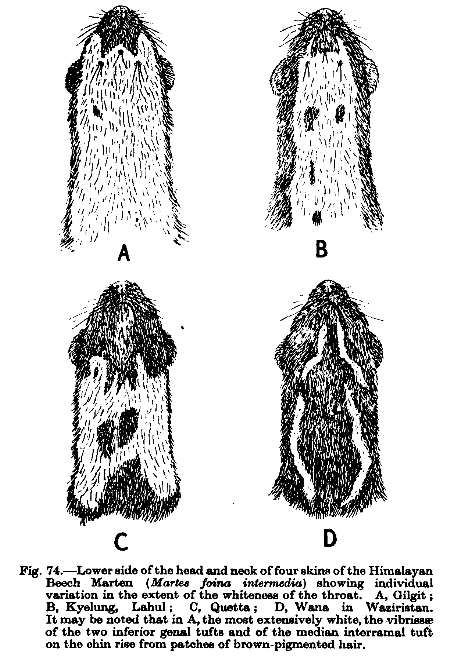
Various throat patch variations, as illustrated in Pocock, R. I. The Fauna of British India, including Ceylon and Burma. Vol. Mammalia 2.

The elongated body combined with short legs enable the beech marten to move in narrow spaces easily

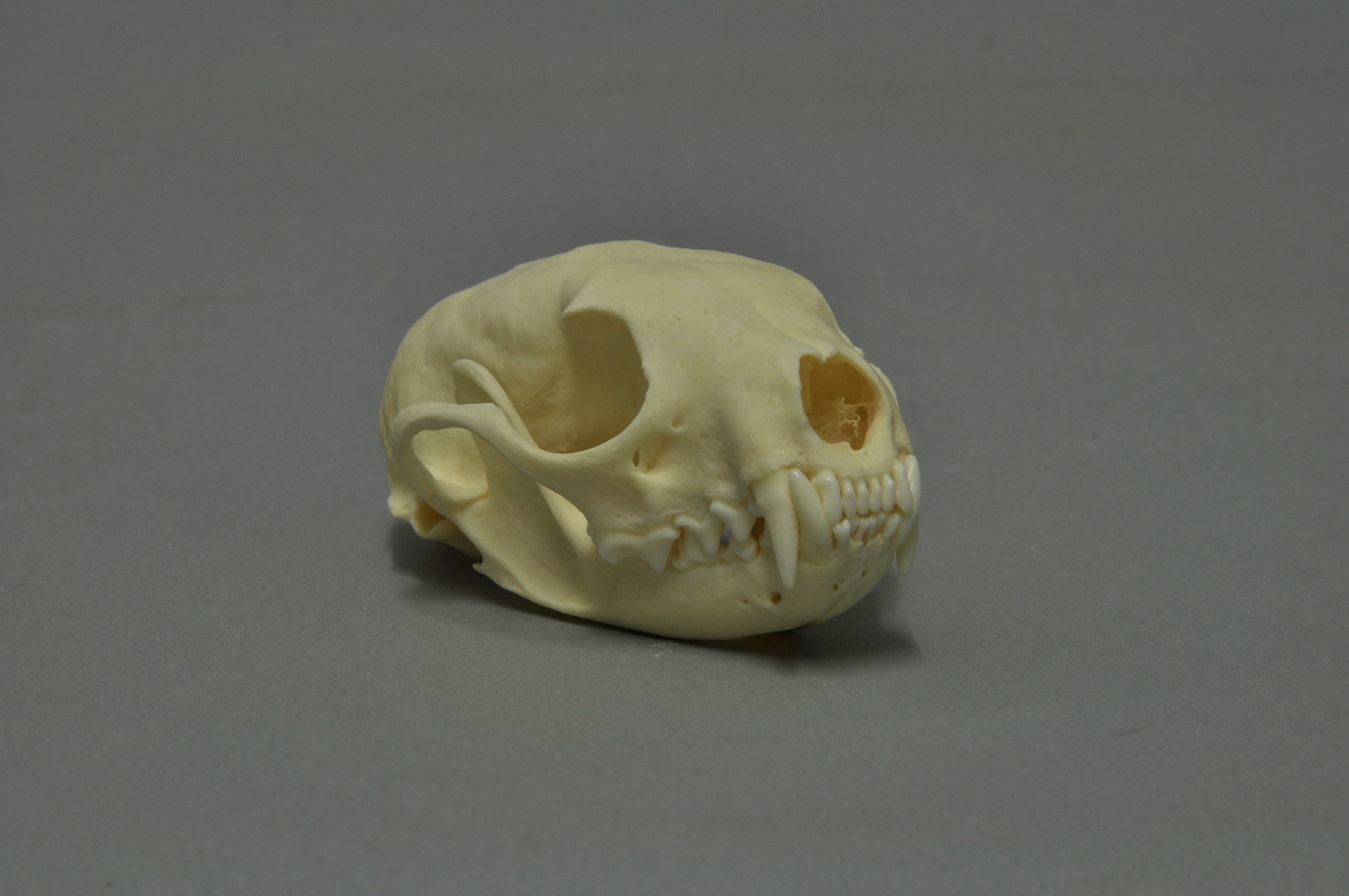
Skull of a beech marten

The beech marten is superficially similar to the pine marten, but has a somewhat longer tail, a more elongated and angular head and has shorter, more rounded and widely spaced ears. Its nose is also of a light peach or grey colour, whereas that of the pine marten is dark black or greyish-black. Its feet are not as densely furred as those of the pine marten, thus making them look less broad, with the paw pads remaining visible even in winter. Because of its shorter limbs, the beech marten's manner of locomotion differs from that of the pine marten; the beech marten moves by creeping in a polecat-like manner, whereas the pine marten and sable move by bounds. The load per 1 cm^{2} of the supporting surface of the beech marten's foot (30.9 g) is double that of the pine marten (15.2 g), thus it is obliged to avoid snowy regions.

Its skull is similar to that of the pine marten, but differs in its shorter facial region, more convex profile, its larger carnassials and smaller molars. The beech marten's penis is larger than the pine marten's, with the bacula of young beech martens often outsizing those of old pine martens. Males measure 430–590 mm in body length, while females measure 380–470 mm. The tail measures 250–320 mm in males and 230–275 mm in females. Males weigh 1.7–1.8 kg in winter and 2–2.1 kg in summer, while females weigh 1.1–1.3 kg in winter and 1.4–1.5 kg in summer.

The beech marten's fur is coarser than the pine marten's, with elastic guard hairs and less dense underfur. Its summer coat is short, sparse and coarse, and the tail is sparsely furred. The colour tone is lighter than the pine marten's. Unlike the pine marten, its underfur is whitish, rather than greyish. The tail is dark-brown, while the back is darker than that of the pine marten. The throat patch of the beech marten is always white. The patch is large and generally has two projections extending backwards to the base of the forelegs and upward on the legs. The dark colour of the belly juts out between the forelegs as a line into the white colour of the chest and sometimes into the neck. In the pine marten, by contrast, the white colour between the forelegs juts backwards as a protrusion into the belly colour.

== Behaviour and ecology ==
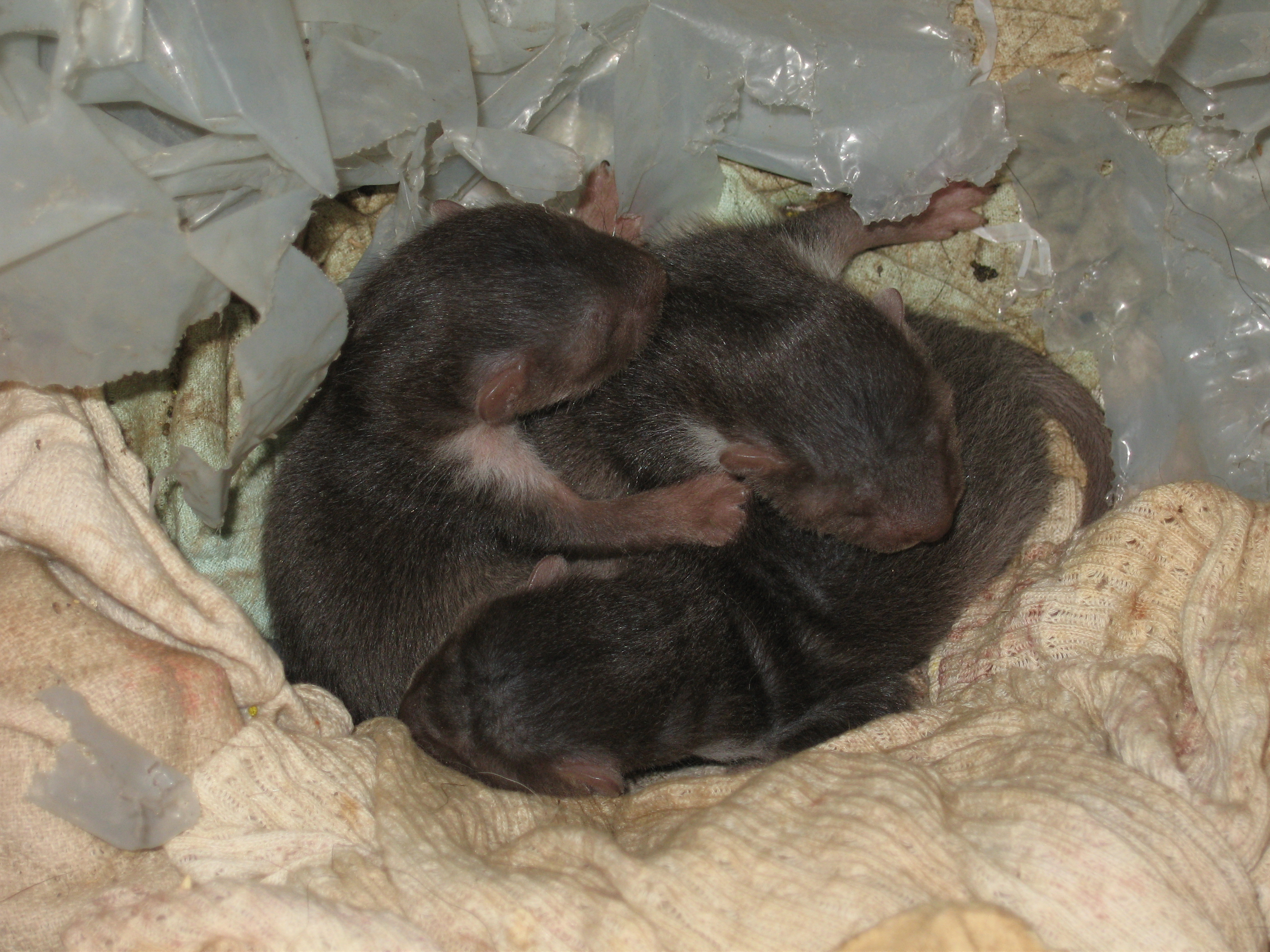
A litter of beech marten kits in a farm outbuilding in the village of Orlintzi, Bulgaria

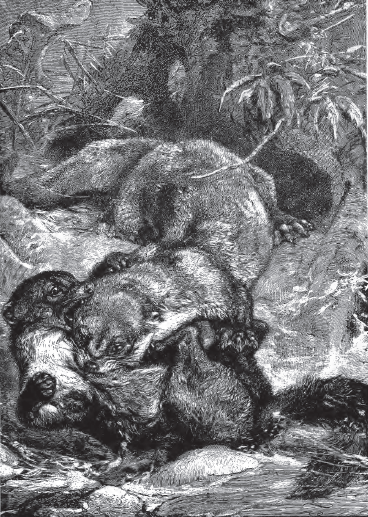
Beech marten fighting a European otter, as illustrated in Brehm's Life of Animals

The beech marten is mainly a crepuscular and nocturnal animal, though to a much lesser extent than the European polecat. It is especially active during moonlit nights. Being a more terrestrial animal than the pine marten, the beech marten is less arboreal in its habits, though it can be a skilled climber in heavily forested areas. It is a skilled swimmer, and may occasionally be active during daytime hours, particularly in the summer, when nights are short. It typically hunts on the ground. During heavy snowfalls, the beech marten moves through paths made by hares or skis.

=== Social and territorial behaviours ===
In an area of northeastern Spain, where the beech marten still lives in relatively unmodified habitats, one specimen was recorded to have had a home range of 52.5 ha (130 acres) with two centres of activity. Its period of maximum activity occurred between 6 PM and midnight. Between 9 AM and 6 PM, the animal was found to be largely inactive. In urban areas, beech marten's dens are almost entirely in buildings, particularly during winter. The beech marten does not dig burrows, nor does it occupy those of other animals. Instead, it nests in naturally occurring fissures and clefts in rocks, spaces between stones in rock slides and inhabited or uninhabited stone structures. It may live in tree holes at a height of up to 9 metres.

=== Reproduction and development ===
Estrus and copulation occur at the same time as in the pine marten. Copulation can last longer than 1 hour. Mating occurs in the June–July period, and takes place in the morning or in moonlit nights on the ground or on the roofs of houses. The gestation period lasts as long as the pine marten's, lasting 236–237 days in the wild, and 254–275 days in fur farms. Parturition takes place in late March-early April, with the average litter consisting of 3–7 kits. The kits are born blind, and begin to see at the age of 30–36 days. The lactation period lasts 40–45 days. In early July, the young are indistinguishable from the adults.

=== Diet ===
The beech marten's diet includes a much higher quantity of plant food than that of the pine marten and sable. Plant foods eaten by the beech marten include cherries, apples, pears, plums, black nightshade, tomatoes, grapes, raspberries and mountain ash. Plant food typically predominates during the winter months. Rats, mice and chickens are also eaten. Among bird species preyed upon by the beech marten, sparrow-like birds predominate, though snowcocks and partridges may also be taken. The marten likes to plunder nests of birds including passerines, galliformes and small owls, preferring to kill the parents in addition to the fledglings. Although it rarely attacks poultry, some specimens may become specialized poultry raiders, even when wild prey is abundant. Males tend to target large, live prey more than females, who feed on small prey and carrion with greater frequency.

=== Relationships with other predators ===
In areas where the beech marten is sympatric with the pine marten, the two species avoid competing with one another by assuming different ecological niches; the pine marten feeds on birds and rodents more frequently, while the beech marten feeds on fruits and insects. However, in one known case, a subadult beech marten was killed by a pine marten. The beech marten has been known to kill European polecats on rare occasions. Red foxes, lynxes, golden eagles, and Eurasian eagle-owls may prey on adults, and juveniles are vulnerable to attack by birds of prey and wildcats. There is, however, one case, from Germany, of a beech marten killing a domestic cat, although there is also a report of a domestic cat killing a beech marten after a struggle lasting more than half an hour.

== Range ==
The beech marten is a widespread species which occurs throughout much of Europe and Central Asia. It occurs from Spain and Portugal in the west, through Central and Southern Europe, the Middle East and Central Asia, extending as far east as the Altai and Tien Shan mountains and northwest China. Within Europe, the species is absent in the British Isles, Scandinavian Peninsula, Finland, the northern Baltic and northern European Russia. It occurs in Afghanistan, Pakistan, India, Nepal, Bhutan and was recently confirmed to inhabit northern Burma.

=== Introduction in North America ===
The beech marten is present in Wisconsin, particularly near the urban centres surrounding Milwaukee. It is also present in several wooded, upland areas in the Kettle Moraine State Forest, and in nearby woodlands of Walworth, Racine, Waukesha and probably Jefferson Counties. North American beech martens are likely descended from feral animals that escaped a private fur farm in Burlington during the 1940s. They have also been listed as being released or having escaped in 1972.

== Relationships with humans ==
=== Tameability ===
George Rolleston theorised that the "domestic cat" of the Ancient Greeks and Romans was in fact the beech marten. Jeanne Villepreux-Power kept two tame beech martens.

=== Hunting and fur use ===
Although the beech marten is a valuable animal to the fur trade, its pelt is inferior in quality to that of the pine marten and sable. Beech marten skins on the fur markets of the Soviet Union accounted for only 10–12% of the market presence of pine marten skins. Beech martens were caught only in the Caucasus, in the Montane part of Crimea and (in very small numbers) in the rest of Ukraine, and in the republics of Middle Asia. Because animals with more valuable pelts are rare in those areas, the beech marten is of value to hunters on the local market. Beech martens are captured with jaw traps, or, for live capture, with cage traps. The shooting of beech martens is inefficient, and trailing them with dogs is only successful when the animal can be trapped in a tree hollow.

=== Car damage ===
Since the mid-1970s, the beech marten has been known to occasionally cause damage to cars. Cars attacked by martens typically have cut tubes and cables. The reason for this behaviour is not fully known, as the damaged items are not eaten. There is, however, a seasonal peak in marten attacks on cars in spring, when young martens explore their surroundings more often and have yet to learn which items in their habitat are edible or not.

=== Large Hadron Collider ===
On 29 April and 21 November 2016, two beech martens shut down the Large Hadron Collider, the world's most powerful particle accelerator, by climbing on 18–66 kV electrical transformers located above ground near the LHCb and ALICE experiments, respectively. The second marten was stuffed and put on display in the Rotterdam Natural History Museum.
