= Pamirioceras =

Scientific classification
- Kingdom: Animalia
- Phylum: Mollusca
- Class: Cephalopoda
- Subclass: †Ammonoidea
- Order: †Goniatitida
- Family: †Adrianitidae
- Subfamily: †Pamiritellinae; Ruzhencev & Bogoslovskaya 1978
- Genus: †Pamirioceras

Extinct genus of ammonites

Pamirioceras is an extinct genus of ammonites in the monotypic Adrianitidae subfamily Pamiritellinae. They are an extinct group of ammonoid, which are shelled cephalopods related to squids, belemnites, octopuses, and cuttlefish, and more distantly to the nautiloids.
