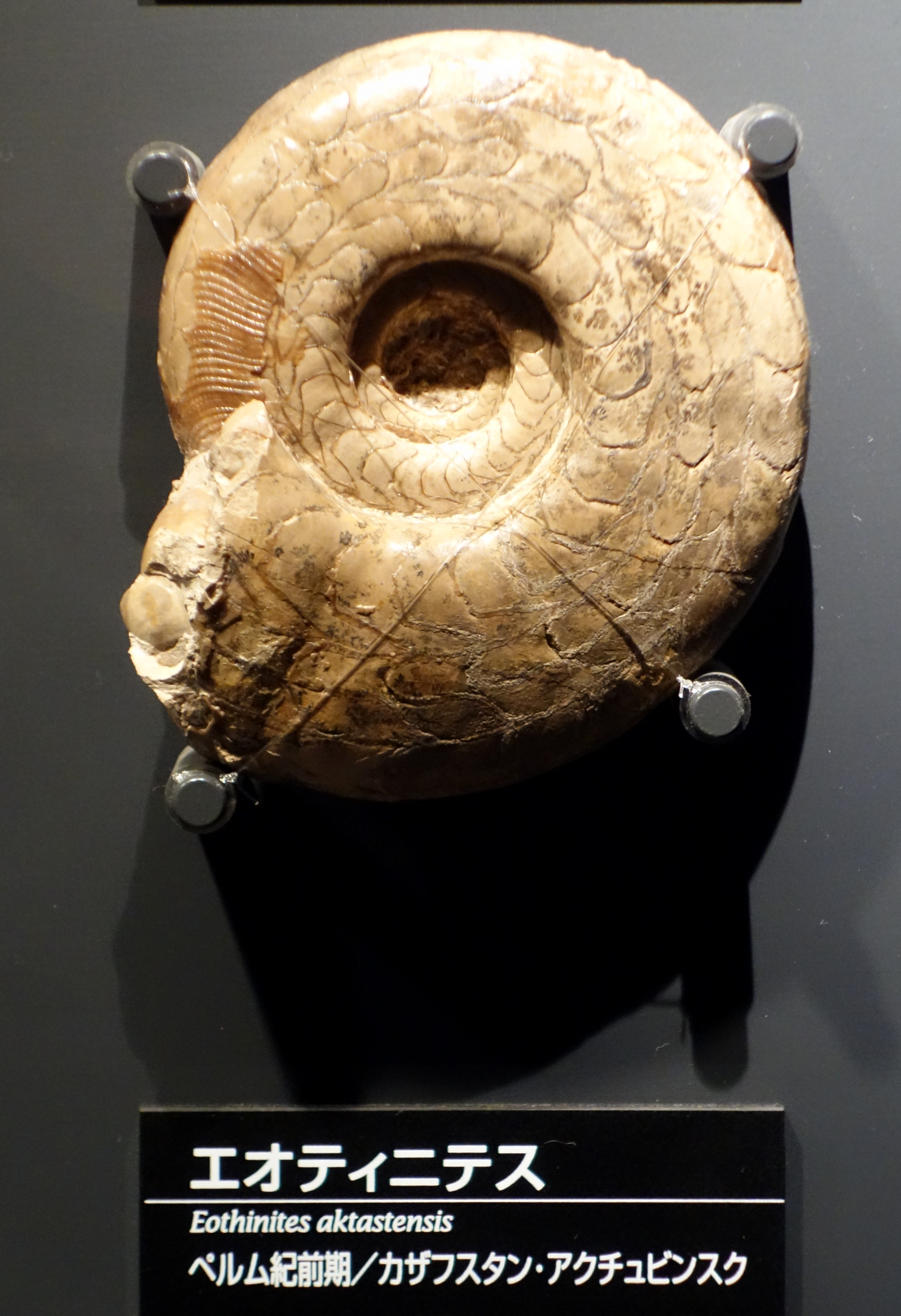
- Eothinites aktastensis in the National Museum of Nature and Science, Tokyo

Scientific classification
- Kingdom: Animalia
- Phylum: Mollusca
- Class: Cephalopoda
- Subclass: †Ammonoidea
- Order: †Goniatitida
- Superfamily: †Neoicoceratoidea
- Family: †Metalegoceratidae; Ruzhencev, 1956

Genera
- Bransonoceras; Juresanites; Metalegoceras; Parametalegoceras; Pseudometalegoceras; Pseudoschistoceras

Synonyms
- Spirolegoceratidae

= Metalegoceratidae =

Family of molluscs (fossil)

Metalegoceratidae is one of eleven families of the Neoicoceratoidea superfamily. They are an extinct group of ammonoid, which are shelled cephalopods related to squids, belemnites, octopuses, and cuttlefish, and more distantly to the nautiloids.
