= Ramositidae =

Scientific classification
- Kingdom: Animalia
- Phylum: Mollusca
- Class: Cephalopoda
- Subclass: †Ammonoidea
- Order: †Goniatitida
- Superfamily: †Neodimorphoceratoidea
- Family: †Ramositidae; Ruzhencev & Bogoslovskaya 1969

Genera
- Cravenoceratoides; Ramosites

Extinct family of molluscs

Ramositidae is one of two families of the superfamily Neodimorphoceratoidea. They are an extinct group of ammonoid, which are shelled cephalopods related to squids, belemnites, octopuses, and cuttlefish, and more distantly to the nautiloids.
