= Marathonitinae =

Scientific classification
- Kingdom: Animalia
- Phylum: Mollusca
- Class: Cephalopoda
- Subclass: †Ammonoidea
- Order: †Goniatitida
- Family: †Marathonitidae
- Subfamily: †Marathonitinae; Ruzhencev, 1938

Genera
- Aksuites; Almites; Cardiella; Eohyattoceras; Marathonites; Promarathonites; Pseudovidrioceras; Suakites

Extinct subfamily of molluscs

Marathonitinae is one of four subfamilies in the family Marathonitidae. They are an extinct group of ammonoid, which are shelled cephalopods related to squids, belemnites, octopuses, and cuttlefish, and more distantly to the nautiloids.
