= Berkhoceratidae =

Scientific classification
- Kingdom: Animalia
- Phylum: Mollusca
- Class: Cephalopoda
- Subclass: †Ammonoidea
- Order: †Goniatitida
- Superfamily: †Dimorphoceratoidea
- Family: †Berkhoceratidae; Librovitch, 1957

Genus
- Kazakhoceras

Extinct family of molluscs

Berkhoceratidae is one of two families of the Dimorphoceratoidea superorder. They are an extinct group of ammonoid, which are shelled cephalopods related to squids, belemnites, octopuses, and cuttlefish, and more distantly to the nautiloids.
