= Gleboceras =

Gleboceras Temporal range: Late Carb (Penn)

Scientific classification
- Domain: Eukaryota
- Kingdom: Animalia
- Phylum: Mollusca
- Class: Cephalopoda
- Subclass: †Ammonoidea
- Order: †Goniatitida
- Family: †Thalassoceratidae
- Subfamily: †Gleboceratinae
- Genus: †Gleboceras; Ruzhencev, 1950

Species
- see text

Extinct genus of molluscs

Gleboceras is a globular goniatitid from the upper Carboniferous of the Urals, named by Ruzhentsev, 1950, tentatively assigned to the Thalassoceratidae, and placed in the subfamily Gleboceratinae. The ventral (outer marginal) lobe is moderately wide, with parallel sides. The lateral lobe is serrate.
