= Neodimorphoceratoidea =

Scientific classification
- Kingdom: Animalia
- Phylum: Mollusca
- Class: Cephalopoda
- Subclass: †Ammonoidea
- Order: †Goniatitida
- Suborder: †Goniatitina
- Superfamily: †Neodimorphoceratoidea; Furnish & Knapp 1966

Families
- Neodimorphoceratidae; Ramositidae

Synonyms
- Neodimorphocerataceae

Extinct superfamily of molluscs

Neodimorphoceratoidea is one of seventeen superfamilies of the suborder Goniatitina. They are an extinct group of ammonoid, which are shelled cephalopods related to squids, belemnites, octopuses, and cuttlefish, and more distantly to the nautiloids.
