= Yinoceratinae =

Scientific classification
- Kingdom: Animalia
- Phylum: Mollusca
- Class: Cephalopoda
- Subclass: †Ammonoidea
- Order: †Goniatitida
- Family: †Pseudohaloritidae
- Subfamily: †Yinoceratinae; Ruzhencev, 1960

Genera
- Lanceoloboceras; Yinoceras

Extinct subfamily of molluscs

Yinoceratinae is one of three subfamilies of the goniatitid ammonoid family Pseudohaloritidae.
