= Neodimorphoceratidae =

Scientific classification
- Kingdom: Animalia
- Phylum: Mollusca
- Class: Cephalopoda
- Subclass: †Ammonoidea
- Order: †Goniatitida
- Superfamily: †Neodimorphoceratoidea
- Family: †Neodimorphoceratidae; Furnish & Knapp 1966

Genera
- Cymoceras; Dimorphoceratoides; Neodimorphoceras; Pintoceras; Politoceras; Shuichengoceras

Extinct family of molluscs

Neodimorphoceratidae is one of two families of the Neodimorphocerataceae superfamily. They are an extinct group of ammonoid, which are shelled cephalopods related to squids, belemnites, octopuses, and cuttlefish, and more distantly to the nautiloids.
