= Marathonitidae =

Scientific classification
- Kingdom: Animalia
- Phylum: Mollusca
- Class: Cephalopoda
- Subclass: †Ammonoidea
- Order: †Goniatitida
- Superfamily: †Marathonitoidea
- Family: †Marathonitidae; Ruzhencev 1938

Subfamilies
- Jilingitinae; Kargalitinae; Kufengoceratinae; Marathonitinae

Extinct family of molluscs

Marathonitidae is the only family in the Marathonitoidea superfamily. They are an extinct group of ammonoid, which are shelled cephalopods related to squids, belemnites, octopuses, and cuttlefish, and more distantly to the nautiloids.
