= Pericycloceratidae =

Pericycloceratidae Temporal range: Bashkirian to Kungurian 318.100–272.500 Ma

Scientific classification
- Kingdom: Animalia
- Phylum: Mollusca
- Class: Cephalopoda
- Subclass: †Ammonoidea
- Order: †Goniatitida
- Superfamily: †Neoicoceratoidea
- Family: †Pericycloceratidae; Zhao & Zheng, 1977

Genera
- Eolegoceras; Pericycloceras

Extinct family of molluscs

Pericycloceratidae is one of eleven families of the Neoicoceratoidea superfamily. They are an extinct group of ammonoid, which are shelled cephalopods related to squids, belemnites, octopuses, and cuttlefish, and more distantly to the nautiloids.
