= Pseudohaloritinae =

- Pseudohalorites sp., Shanghai Natural History Museum

Scientific classification
- Kingdom: Animalia
- Phylum: Mollusca
- Class: Cephalopoda
- Subclass: †Ammonoidea
- Order: †Goniatitida
- Family: †Pseudohaloritidae
- Subfamily: †Pseudohaloritinae; Ruzhencev, 1957

Genera
- Pseudohalorites; Zhonglupuceras

Extinct subfamily of molluscs

Pseudohaloritinae is one of three subfamilies of the Pseudohaloritidae family, a member of the Goniatitida order. They are an extinct group of ammonoid, which are shelled cephalopods related to squids, belemnites, octopuses, and cuttlefish, and more distantly to the nautiloids.
