= Glyphiolobinae =

Scientific classification
- Domain: Eukaryota
- Kingdom: Animalia
- Phylum: Mollusca
- Class: Cephalopoda
- Subclass: †Ammonoidea
- Order: †Goniatitida
- Family: †Dimorphoceratidae
- Subfamily: †Glyphiolobinae; Ruzhencev & Bogoslovskaya 1969

Genera
- Anthracoceratites; Glyphiolobus; Metadimorphoceras; Paradimorphoceras; Sulcodimorphoceras

Extinct subfamily of molluscs

Glyphiolobinae is one of two subfamilies of the family Dimorphoceratidae. They are an extinct group of ammonoid, which are shelled cephalopods related to squids, belemnites, octopuses, and cuttlefish, and more distantly to the nautiloids.
