= Dimorphoceratinae =

Dimorphoceratinae Temporal range: Late Paleozoic

Scientific classification
- Domain: Eukaryota
- Kingdom: Animalia
- Phylum: Mollusca
- Class: Cephalopoda
- Subclass: †Ammonoidea
- Order: †Goniatitida
- Family: †Dimorphoceratidae
- Subfamily: †Dimorphoceratinae; Hyatt 1884

Genera
- Asturoceras; Dimorphoceras; Trizonoceras

Extinct subfamily of molluscs

Dimorphoceratinae is one of two subfamilies included in the family Dimorphoceratidae. The subfamily is characterized by having only the ventral lobe of the suture subdivided. Shells are completely involute, with the inner whorls completely hidden, and mostly suboxiconic such that the rim, or venter, is fairly narrow. Sculpture consists only of growth lines, sometimes with delicate spiral ornamentation. The Ventral lobe becomes extremely wide by subdivision.
