= Thalassoceratidae =

Thalassoceratidae Temporal range: Gzhelian - Wordian

Scientific classification
- Domain: Eukaryota
- Kingdom: Animalia
- Phylum: Mollusca
- Class: Cephalopoda
- Subclass: †Ammonoidea
- Order: †Goniatitida
- Superfamily: †Thalassoceratoidea
- Family: †Thalassoceratidae; Alpheus Hyatt, 1900

Genera
- Gleboceras; Mapesites?; Aristoceratinae; Allothalassoceras; Aristoceras; Aristoceratoides; Thalassoceratinae; Eothalassoceras; Epithalassoceras; Prothalassoceras; Thalassoceras

Extinct family of ammonites

Thalassoceratidae a family of late Paleozoic ammonites included in the goniatitid superfamily Thalassoceratoidea along with the Bisatoceratidae. Some eight genera are included, although the specific number and exactly which depends on the particular classification.

Thalassoceratids are characterized by thick-discoidal to subglobular, involute shells with narrow or closed umbilici and serrate or digitate external lobes in the suture. This latter distinguishes them from the Bisatoceratidae in which the external lobes are smooth. The ventral lobe is extremely wide; the height of median saddle may exceed half the height of the entire ventral lobe itself. Some forms have ventrolateral grooves but spiral ornamentation is absent.

Miller, Funish, and Schindewolf, 1957, in the Treatise on Invertebrate Paleontology Part L included Thalassoceras, Eothalassoceras, Delepinoceas, Gleboceras, Epithalassoceras. Saunders, Work, and Nikolaeva, 1999, included Eothalassoceras, Prothalassoceras, Gleboceras, Aistoceras, Thalassoceras, Epithalassoceras, Aristoceratoides. In the revised Treatise (W.M. Furnish et al. 2009) the Thalassoceratidae is divided into two subfamilies, the Gleboceratinae which includes Gleboceras and Mapesites and the Thalssoceratinae which includes Aristoceras, Aristoceratoides, Eothalassoceras, Epithalassoceras, Prothalassoceras, and Thalassoceras. Leonova & Boiko (2011) later removed Mapesites from Thalassoceratidae due to its ornamentation being vastly different from Gleboceras. They also utilized the subfamily Aristoceratinae, which involved an evolutionary sequence from Aristoceras to Allothalassoceras to Aristoceratoides.
