= Jilingitinae =

Scientific classification
- Kingdom: Animalia
- Phylum: Mollusca
- Class: Cephalopoda
- Subclass: †Ammonoidea
- Order: †Goniatitida
- Family: †Marathonitidae
- Subfamily: †Jilingitinae; Liang 1982

Genus
- Jilingites

Extinct subfamily of molluscs

Jilingitinae is one of four subfamilies in the families Marathonitidae. They are an extinct group of ammonoid, which are shelled cephalopods related to squids, belemnites, octopuses, and cuttlefish, and more distantly to the nautiloids.
