= Hoffmanniinae =

Scientific classification
- Kingdom: Animalia
- Phylum: Mollusca
- Class: Cephalopoda
- Subclass: †Ammonoidea
- Order: †Goniatitida
- Family: †Adrianitidae
- Subfamily: †Hoffmanniinae; Spath 1934
- Genus: †Hoffmannia; Gemmellaro, 1887

Extinct subfamily of molluscs

Hoffmanniinae is an adrianitid ammonoid cephalopod subfamily established for the Middle Permian genus Hoffmannia.

Hoffmannia, named by Gemmellaro in 1887, is a discoidal adrianitid with a large umbilicus, prominent growth lines, and sutures with about 20 lobes. Note that the genus Hoffmannia is included in the Adrianitinae in the older Treatise on Invertebrate Paleontology volume on Ammonoidea and that it has been reassigned to the Hoffmanniinae, named by Spath in 1934, revived in the new Treatise volume on Carboniferous and Permian Ammonoidea.
