= Kargalitinae =

Scientific classification
- Kingdom: Animalia
- Phylum: Mollusca
- Class: Cephalopoda
- Subclass: †Ammonoidea
- Order: †Goniatitida
- Family: †Marathonitidae
- Subfamily: †Kargalitinae; Ruzhencev 1960

Genera
- Kargalites; Subkargalites

Extinct subfamily of shelled animals

Kargalitinae is one of four subfamilies in the family Marathonitidae. They are an extinct group of ammonoid, which are shelled cephalopods related to squids, belemnites, octopuses, and cuttlefish, and more distantly to the nautiloids.
