= Neoaganides =

Neoaganides Temporal range: Pennsylvanian–Permian

Scientific classification
- Domain: Eukaryota
- Kingdom: Animalia
- Phylum: Mollusca
- Class: Cephalopoda
- Subclass: †Ammonoidea
- Order: †Goniatitida
- Family: †Pseudohaloritidae
- Subfamily: †Shouchangoceratinae
- Genus: †Neoaganides; Plummer & Scott, 1937

Genus of molluscs (fossil)

Neoaganides is a small, 1–2 cm diameter subdiscoidal to subglobular goniatitid belonging to the family Pseudohaloritidae that lived from the Late Pennsylvanian to the Late Permian, existing for some 56 million years.

The shell of Neoaganides has a well-developed hyponomic sinus and shallow lateral reentrents at the aperture outlined by growth lines. Otherwise sculpture is lacking. The mature peristome rimming the aperture is simple and unconstricted, without pronounced lappets. The siphuncle is subcentral, ventral of the dorsal septal flexture. The suture is simple, goniatitic, with essentially symmetrical, undivided lobes. The ventral lobe is moderately wide, lanceolate or linguate, tongue-shaped; the dorsal lobe deep and narrow. The lateral and umbilical lobes (2 pairs) are broad, the internal lobes narrow and close to the dorsal.

Neoaganitdes is included in the subfamily Shouchangoceratinae, which are pseuohalorids characterized by rounded or attenuate "goniatitic" sutures, and most likely gave rise to the other, more prominently sculptured genera in the same subfamily.
