= Eupleuroceratidae =

Scientific classification
- Kingdom: Animalia
- Phylum: Mollusca
- Class: Cephalopoda
- Subclass: †Ammonoidea
- Order: †Goniatitida
- Superfamily: †Neoicoceratoidea
- Family: †Eupleuroceratidae; Ruzhencev, 1956

Genera
- Eupleuroceras

Extinct family of molluscs

Eupleuroceratidae is one of eleven families of the Neoicoceratoidea superfamily. They are an extinct group of ammonoid, which are shelled cephalopods related to squids, belemnites, octopuses, and cuttlefish, and more distantly to the nautiloids.
