= Thalassoceratoidea =

Thalassoceratoidea Temporal range: Bashkirian to Wordian

Scientific classification
- Domain: Eukaryota
- Kingdom: Animalia
- Phylum: Mollusca
- Class: Cephalopoda
- Subclass: †Ammonoidea
- Order: †Goniatitida
- Suborder: †Goniatitina
- Superfamily: †Thalassoceratoidea; Hyatt, 1900

Families
- Bisatoceratidae; Thalassoceratidae

Synonyms
- Thalassocerataceae

Extinct superfamily of ammonites

Thalassoceratoidea, formerly Thalassocerataceae, is a superfamily of Late Paleozoic ammonites characterized by their thick-discoidal to subglobular, involute shells with narrow or closed umbilici and biconvex growth striae with ventral sinuses. The ventral lobe of the suture, which straddles the outer rim, is wide, and bifid, with a tall median saddle.

Thallassoceratoidea are gonitites and one of seventeen superfamilies in the Goniatitina suborder. Two families are now included, Bisatoceratidae and Thalassoceratidae. The somewhat older but overlapping Bisatoceratidae used to be included as a subfamily in the Goniatitidae. Thalassoceratidae was included in the Dimorphocerataceae.
