= Anuitidae =

Scientific classification
- Kingdom: Animalia
- Phylum: Mollusca
- Class: Cephalopoda
- Subclass: †Ammonoidea
- Order: †Goniatitida
- Superfamily: †Neoicoceratoidea
- Family: †Anuitidae; Andrianov 1985

Genus
- Anuites

Extinct family of molluscs

Anuitidae is one of eleven families of the Neoicoceratoidea superfamily. They are an extinct group of ammonoid, which are shelled cephalopods related to squids, belemnites, octopuses, and cuttlefish, and more distantly to the nautiloids.
