= Bisatoceratidae =

Bisatoceratidae Temporal range: Bashkirian - Missourian

Scientific classification
- Domain: Eukaryota
- Kingdom: Animalia
- Phylum: Mollusca
- Class: Cephalopoda
- Subclass: †Ammonoidea
- Order: †Goniatitida
- Superfamily: †Thalassoceratoidea
- Family: †Bisatoceratidae; Ruzhentsev 1975

Genera
- Bisatoceras; Neoglaphyrites; Pseudobisatoceras

Extinct family of ammonites

Bisatoceratidae is a family of Late Paleozoic ammonites now included in the Thalassoceratoidea characterized by thick-discoidal to subglobular, involute shells in which lobes are simple. Some forms have spiral ornamentation.

Bisatoceratidae was originally a subfamily of the Goniatitidae as Bisatoceratinae, named by Miller and Furnish, 1957, and introduced in the Treatise on Invertebrate Paleontology, Part L, 1957. Its relation to the Thalassoceratidae is tenuous.
