= Texoceras =

Texoceras Temporal range: Middle Permian

Scientific classification
- Domain: Eukaryota
- Kingdom: Animalia
- Phylum: Mollusca
- Class: Cephalopoda
- Subclass: †Ammonoidea
- Order: †Goniatitida
- Family: †Adrianitidae
- Subfamily: †Texoceratinae; Ruzhencev & Bogoslovskaya, 1978
- Genus: †Texoceras; Miller & Furnish, 1937

Extinct genus of molluscs

Texoceras is an extinct ammonoid genus in the monotypic goniatitid subfamily Texoceratinae, included in the family Adrianitidae. These were shelled cephalopods more closely related to squids, belemnites, octopuses, and cuttlefish than to nautiloids from which they are derived.

Texoceras, named and described by Miller & Furnish in 1937, has an involute subglobular shell, like Adrianites, with a narrow deep umbilicus in the middle, but with a reticulate surface and a suture that forms 14 rounded lobes.
