= Bisatoceras =

Bisatoceras Temporal range: Bashkirian - Missourian

Scientific classification
- Domain: Eukaryota
- Kingdom: Animalia
- Phylum: Mollusca
- Class: Cephalopoda
- Subclass: †Ammonoidea
- Order: †Goniatitida
- Family: †Bisatoceratidae
- Genus: †Bisatoceras; Miller and Owen, 1937

Species
- See text

Extinct genus of molluscs

Bisatoceras is a late Paleozoic (Upper Mississippian - Upper Pennsylvanian) Ammonoidea, a member of the goniatitid family Bisatoceratidae.

Bisatoceras was named by Miller and Owen in 1937 and has a subdiscoidal shell with a very narrow or closed umbilicus. Whorl height exceeds with at maturity, immature growth stages are globular. Growth lines are usually biconvex, forming ventral and lateral sinuses. Two or three lateral constrictions are formed on each whorl during early growth stages but constrictions are absent at full maturity. The ventral lobe of the suture is double pronged with the median saddle exceeding two thirds the height of the lobe itself.

Pseudobisatoceras, named by Maksimova, 1940, is like Bisatoceras but is distinct in having spiral ornamentation. Its temporal range coincides with the early part of that of Bisatoceras.

Miller et al considered Pseudobisatoceras a synonym for Bisatoceras which was included in the family Goniatitidae and subfamily Bisatoceratinae.
