= Pseudohaloritoidea =

Pseudohaloritoidea Temporal range: Middle Pennsylvanian - Upper Permian

Scientific classification
- Kingdom: Animalia
- Phylum: Mollusca
- Class: Cephalopoda
- Subclass: †Ammonoidea
- Order: †Goniatitida
- Suborder: †Tornoceratina
- Superfamily: †Pseudohaloritoidea; Ruzhencev, 1957

Families
- Maximitidae; Pseudohaloritidae

Extinct superfamily of molluscs

Pseudohaloritoidea, formerly Pseudohaloritaceae, is one of four superfamilies of the goniatitid suborder Tornoceratina. Although attributed the Ruzhencev, 1957 (Ruzhencev named the Pseudohaloritidae, March 1957, eight months ahead of Miller and Furnish) T.J Frest et al. included the Maximitidae and Pseudohaloritidae in the Cheilocerataceae in their May 1981 paper.
