= Accademia Gioenia di Catania =

Coordinates: 37.51531°N 15.09548°E

Gioenian Academy
- Accademia Gioenia
- Type: Academy of Natural Sciences
- Established: 1824; 202 years ago
- Affiliations: University of Catania
- Other students: Corso Italia 55
- Location: Catania, Italy
- Website: www.gioenia.unict.it

The Gioenian Academy (italian: Accademia Gioenia) is a scientific and academic society in Catania, Italy, that was founded in 1824. Today it is closely associated with the University of Catania.

== Origins ==
The academy of natural sciences, which had been conceived by the naturalist Giuseppe Gioeni d'Angiò (1743–1822), was founded in 1824 on the initiative of the knight hospitaller Cesare Borgia, who lived in Catania due to the well-known events of the Order, and ten intellectuals and scientists, among which were Carlo Gemmellaro. The academy had its initial meeting in 1824 at the Palazzo Centrale dell'Università di Catania.

The initial organization separated two sections, both mainly focused on events observable in Sicily: a section of Storia Naurale (Natural History) and one of Scienze Fisiche. The latter often focused on the particular geology and vulcanology of Sicily, but also on meteorological observations. It has published for decades a scientific journal.

== Notable members ==
- Edoardo Amaldi, non resident corresponding member from February 27, 1948.
- Federico Cafiero, resident corresponding member from May 25, 1954, then non resident from November 11, 1956.
- Giuseppe Colombo, resident corresponding member on March 11, 1957, non resident from November 1, 1957.
- Gaetano Fichera, honorary member from June 6, 1988.
- Rita Levi Montalcini, honorary member from June 6, 1988.
- Pia Nalli, resident corresponding member on May 1, 1928, then effective member from December 21, 1928.
- Mauro Picone, corresponding member on February 27, 1920, then effettivo from January 4, 1922, then again corresponding member from 1923 on the occasion to his moving to Pisa, and finally non resident corresponding from 1948. Picone was also the Academician Librarian from 1922 to 1923.
- Giovanni Sansone, corresponding member from November 29, 1940, then non resident corresponding from 1948.
- Francesco Severi, honorary member from January 24, 1931.
- Jeanne Villepreux-Power, the academy's first female member (1832), pioneering French marine biologist, and inventor of aquaria.
