= Adrianitoidea =

Adrianitoidea Temporal range: M Pennsylvanian - M Permian

Scientific classification
- Domain: Eukaryota
- Kingdom: Animalia
- Phylum: Mollusca
- Class: Cephalopoda
- Subclass: †Ammonoidea
- Order: †Goniatitida
- Suborder: †Goniatitina
- Superfamily: †Adrianitoidea; Schindewolf 1931

Families
- Adrianitidae

Synonyms
- Adrianitaceae

Extinct superfamily of molluscs

Adrianitoidea is one of seventeen superfamilies currently included in the Goniatitina, but only one of six there included in the Treatise, 1957. Shells are subdiscoidal to globose with variable umbilici and sutures with 10 to 30 lobes, which tend to be subequal.
