= Juillac, Corrèze =

Juillac
- Commune
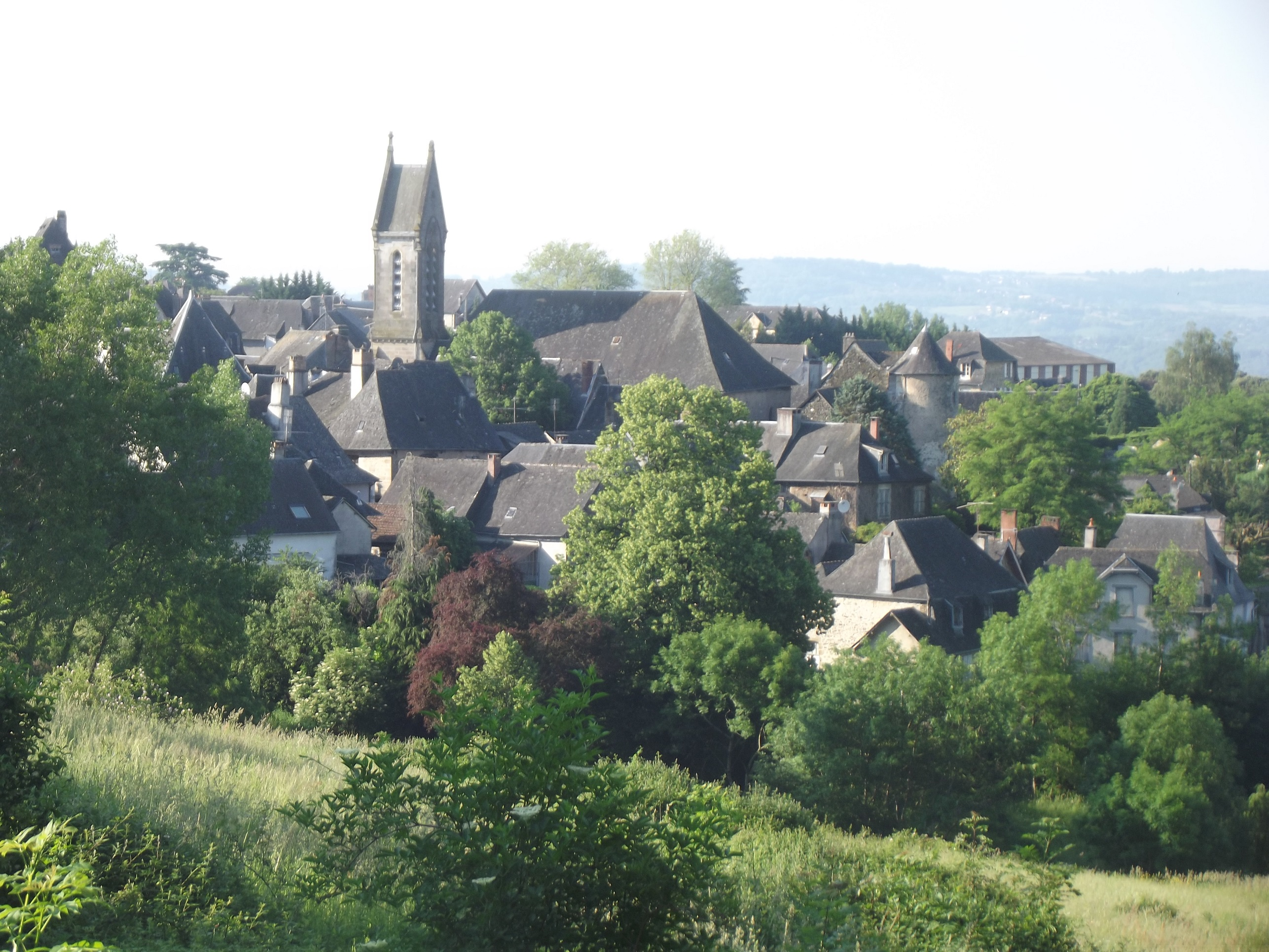
- A general view of Juillac

- Coat of arms
- Location of Juillac
- Location within France Location within Nouvelle-Aquitaine
- Coordinates: 45°19′09″N 1°19′23″E
- Country: France
- Region: Nouvelle-Aquitaine
- Department: Corrèze
- Arrondissement: Brive-la-Gaillarde
- Canton: L'Yssandonnais
- Intercommunality: CA Bassin de Brive

Government
  - Mayor (2020–2026): Josette Fargetas
- Area^{1}: 33.14 km^{2} (12.80 sq mi)
- Elevation: 300 m (980 ft)
- Highest elevation: 410 m (1,350 ft)
- Lowest elevation: 154 m (505 ft)
- Population (2023): 1,153
  - Density: 34.79/km^{2} (90.11/sq mi)
- Time zone: UTC+01:00 (CET)
  - Summer (DST): UTC+02:00 (CEST)
- INSEE/Postal code: 19094 /19350
- ^{1} French Land Register data, which excludes lakes, ponds, glaciers > 1 km^{2} (0.386 sq mi or 247 acres) and river estuaries.

Juillac (French pronunciation: [ʒɥijak]; Occitan: Julhac) is a commune in the Corrèze department in Nouvelle-Aquitaine in southern France. From 1790 to 2015, the municipality was the capital of the canton of Juillac.

== Geography ==
=== Location ===
In the western part of the Department of Corrèze, on the edge of the Brive basin and the country of Uzerche, the municipality of Juillac extends over 33.14 km2. It is watered by the Roseix and its tributary the Tournerie stream which, both, take their source there.

The minimum altitude, 154 metres, lies at the extreme south, where the Roseix leaves the commune and enters on that of Rosiers-de-Juillac. The maximum elevation with 410 or 415 metres is located in the extreme north-west, at the place called lieu-dit les Bichets, on the edge of Saint-Cyr-les-Champagnes. A mark at the post office building indicates 300 meters. The town is hilly.

The village of Juillac, at the intersection of the departmental roads (RD) 39, 71 and 901, lies, in great circle distances, 21 km north of Terrasson-Lavilledieu, 22 km southwest of Uzerche and 24 km north-west of Brive-la-Gaillarde.

The communal territory is also served by RD 4, 52, 52nd, 71E1 and 114.

== Population ==
Historical population
Year	Pop.	±% p.a.
1968	1,452	—
1975	1,268	−1.92%
1982	1,215	−0.61%
1990	1,108	−1.15%
1999	1,089	−0.19%
2007	1,164	+0.84%
2012	1,144	−0.35%
2017	1,126	−0.32%
2023	1,153	+0.40%
Source: INSEE

== Local culture and heritage ==
=== Places and monuments ===
- Church of Saint-Germain.
- Manoir des Miracles.
- Remains of an ancient castle.

=== Cultural heritage ===
Juillac has a freshly renovated media library in the Grande Rue and several Association loi de 1901, one of which aims to highlight the naturalist Jeanne Villepreux-Power.

Still on the main street, a gallery allows regular exhibitions of artists highlighting in these lands of the lower Limousin (e.g. Daniel Cochin, Marijke Munne, Hervé Treuil and Guy Sermadiras).

=== Natural heritage ===
In the north-west of the village, the municipality conceals a natural zone of 304 hectares of a Zone Naturelle d'Intérêt Ecologique, Faunistique et Floristique (ZNIEFF), type 2 in the heart of the Forest of Montcheyrol, a refuge of many animal species.

== Notable people ==
- Patrick Boutot says Patrick Sébastien: Although born in Brive-la-Gaillarde in 1953, he spent part of his childhood in Juillac. A plaque recalling this moment of his life was installed on the facade of the house where he lived, near the church.
- Alain Penaud, former opening half of the XV de France, was born in Juillac in 1969.
- Jean Malaval, born on 25 July 1911 in Chabrignac and died on 9 July 2003 in Tours. Lived all his childhood in Juillac and was the holder of several world records for track cycling before war. He held the Veld'hiv time record. A painter after the war, he was congratulated by the President of the Republic, Mr. Réné Coty, for his first prize at the exhibition of the autumn Salon of the city of Paris. He exhibited in Paris, London, Dallas... [Ref. Required]
- Jeanne Villepreux-Power, known as Lady Power, a French naturalist, was born in Juillac in 1794, and died there in 1871, after having lived in Sicily for a long time. She is the inventor of aquariums.
- Bernard Marque, mathematician, historian and Félibre, born in Juillac in 1866, died in Juillac in 1936.
- François Gouyon, French parliamentarian (1875–1966), born and died in Juillac.
- Adhémar Péchadre (1862–1925), born in Juillac, French MP between 1906 and 1919 in the Marne department
- André Monteil (1915–1998), born in Juillac, associate professor, minister of the government of Pierre Mendès France.
- Jean-Baptiste Chavoix, born in Juillac on 4 October 1739 and died in Juillac on 18 September 1818, was a member of the Constituent Assembly for the Third State, seneschalty of Limoges.
- Michel Mallevergne (1804–1877) was a politician born in Juillac.
- Pierre Jean François Chaffary, born in Villemoustaussou on 17 May 1872 and died in Juillac on 22 August 1950, Brigadier General in 1931.

== See also ==
- Communes of the Corrèze department
