= Mongoloceratidae =

Scientific classification
- Kingdom: Animalia
- Phylum: Mollusca
- Class: Cephalopoda
- Subclass: †Ammonoidea
- Order: †Goniatitida
- Superfamily: †Popanoceratoidea
- Family: †Mongoloceratidae; Ruzhencev & Bogoslovskaya 1978

Genera
- Angrenoceras; Mongoloceras

Extinct family of molluscs

Mongoloceratidae is one of two families of the Popanoceratoidea superfamily. They are an extinct group of ammonoid, which are shelled cephalopods related to squids, belemnites, octopuses, and cuttlefish, and more distantly to the nautiloids.
