= Adrianitidae =

Adrianitidae Temporal range: Middle Pennsylvanian–Middle Permian

Scientific classification
- Kingdom: Animalia
- Phylum: Mollusca
- Class: Cephalopoda
- Subclass: †Ammonoidea
- Order: †Goniatitida
- Superfamily: †Adrianitoidea
- Family: †Adrianitidae; Schindewolf, 1931

Subfamilies
- Adrianitinae; Hoffmanniinae; Texoceratinae

Extinct family of ammonites

Adrianitidae is a family in the Adrianitoidea, a superfamily of ammonites in the cephalopod order, Goniatitida, known from the Middle Pennsylvanian to the Middle Permian.

Members of the Adrianitidae, named by Schindewolf in 1931, and of the Adrianitaceae, have shells (conchs) that are discoidal to globular with umbilici that vary in form, and sutures with 10 to 30, more or less equal, lobes.

The Adrianitinae which come from the Lower and Middle Permian have sutures that form 14 to 30 lobes. Genera included Adrianites, Hoffmannia, Doryceras, Crimites, and Texoceras. The Dumbaritinae which come from the Middle and Upper Pennsylvanian (U Carb) have sutures with only 10 lobes. Clinolobus, from the Middle Permian of Sicily, has about 14 lobes with the course of the external suture forming a V.

== Classification ==
The Adriantidae contains three subfamilies, the Adrianitinae, Hoffmanniinae, and Texoceratinae. Most of the genera in the family, some 15 in number, are included in the Adrianitinae. The remaining two are included, one each, in the Hoffmanniinae and Texoceratinae.

Dunbarites and Clinolobus included in the Adrianantidae in the older edition of Treatise (Part L) have since then been reassigned; Dunbarites to the Schistocerataceae and Clinolobus to the Neoicocerataceae

The Emilitinae, established to include the most primitive members of the family, based on Emilites, have been reincorporated into the Adrianitinae. Pamiritella for which the Pamiritellinae was established is considered also part of the Adrianitinae.

== Phylogeny ==
According to Saunders et al. (1999), the Adrianitidae are derived from Clistoceras, a genus in the Somholitaceae, through Emilites, which in turn is the source for Pseudoemilites and Crimites. Pseudoemilites resulted in small groups that include Veruzhites and Nevadoceras as well. Crimites on the other hand gave rise to Neocrimites and Pamiritella which respectively are the source for the Adrianitinae and Pameritellinae. Crimites also gave rise to Aricoceras and Neoaricoceras. The source for either Hoffmannia or Texoceras is unknown.

== Older taxonomy ==
In the taxonomies put forth by Miller, Furnish, and Schindewolf (ca 1960) in the Treatise on Invertebrate Paleontology, Part L, Ammonoidea, the Adrianitidae is divided into three subfamilies, the more advanced Adrianitinae based on Adrianites, the more primitive Dunbaritinae containing Dunbarites and Emilites, and the Clinolobitinae with just Clinolobus.
