= Aricoceras =

Scientific classification
- Kingdom: Animalia
- Phylum: Mollusca
- Class: Cephalopoda
- Subclass: †Ammonoidea
- Order: †Goniatitida
- Family: †Adrianitidae
- Subfamily: †Adrianitinae
- Genus: †Aricoceras; Ruzhentsev 1950

Genus of molluscs (fossil)

Aricoceras is an extinct genus of the Adrianitidae family. They are an extinct group of ammonoid, which are shelled cephalopods related to squids, belemnites, octopuses, and cuttlefish, and more distantly to the nautiloids.
