= Kufengoceratinae =

Kufengoceratinae Temporal range: Permian, 274.4–251.9 Ma

Scientific classification
- Kingdom: Animalia
- Phylum: Mollusca
- Class: Cephalopoda
- Subclass: †Ammonoidea
- Order: †Goniatitida
- Family: †Cyclolobidae
- Subfamily: †Kufengoceratinae; Zhao, 1980

Genera
- Guiyangoceras; Kufengoceras; Liuzhouceras; Paramexicoceras; Paratongluceras; Shengoceras

Extinct subfamily of molluscs

Kufengoceratinae is a subfamily of Permian ammonites in the family Cyclolobidae. It is known from China, Russia, Greenland, and Japan.
