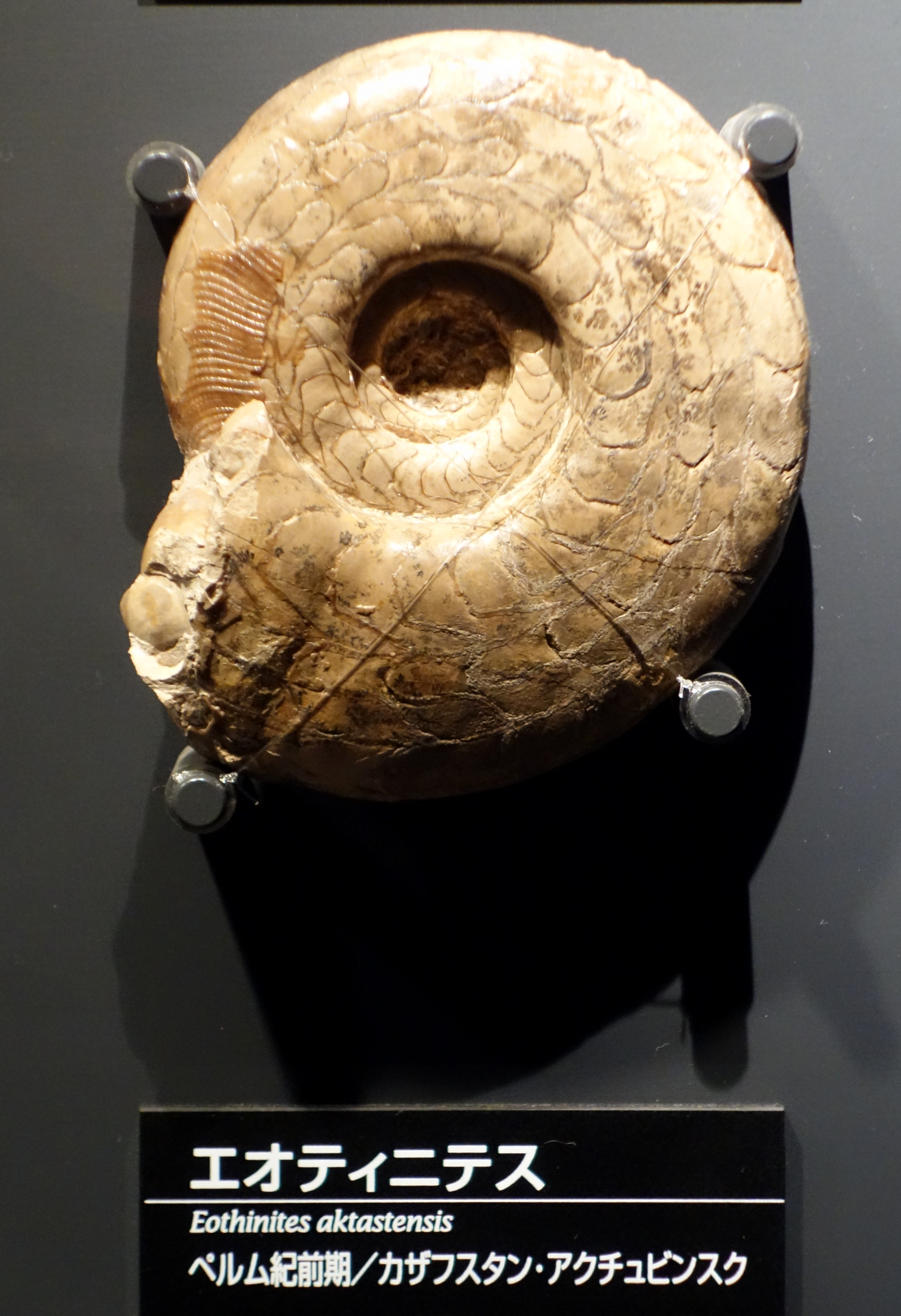
- Eothinites aktastensis in the National Museum of Nature and Science, Tokyo

Scientific classification
- Kingdom: Animalia
- Phylum: Mollusca
- Class: Cephalopoda
- Subclass: †Ammonoidea
- Order: †Goniatitida
- Suborder: †Goniatitina
- Superfamily: †Neoicoceratoidea; Hyatt 1900

Families
- Anuitidae; Aulacogastrioceratidae; Clinolobidae; Eothinitidae; Eupleuroceratidae; Metalegoceratidae; Neoicoceratidae; Paragastrioceratidae; Pericycloceratidae; Spirolegoceratidae

Synonyms
- Neoicocerataceae

= Neoicoceratoidea =

Neoicoceratoidea Temporal range: Early Pennsylvanian – Late Permian

Superfamily of molluscs (fossil)

Neoicoceratoidea, formerly called Neoicocerataceae, is one of seventeen superfamilies of the Goniatitina suborder. Neoicoceratoidea comprises forms previously (Miller et al) included in the Neoioceratidae and Metalegoceratidae, previously included in the Goniatitacae. These, along with new families defined for certain genera, including one from the Schistoceratidae, have been recombined as the Neoicocerataceae.
