= Giuseppe Gioeni =

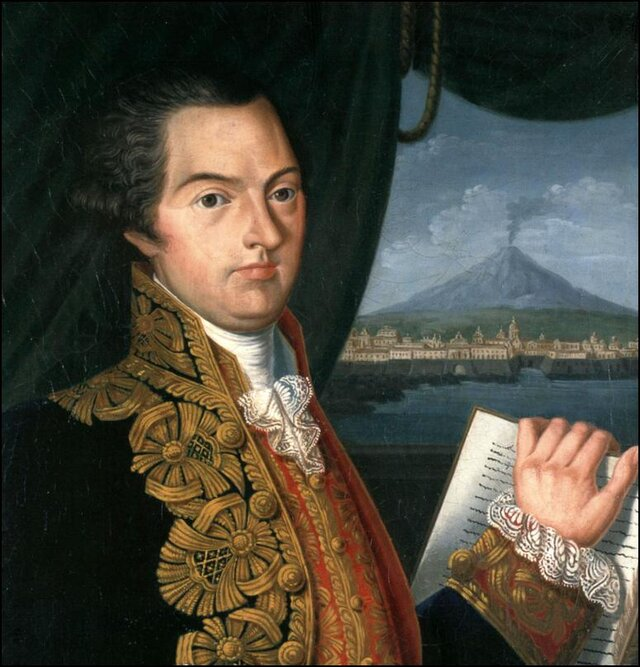
Undated portrait with Mount Etna in the background

Count Giuseppe Gioeni (12 May 1747 – 6 December 1822) was an Italian noble who had an interest in volcanoes. He examined Etna and Vesuvius and wrote about it. This led to his being made chair of natural history at the University of Catania. The Gioeni Academy in Catania was named after him.

== Life and work ==
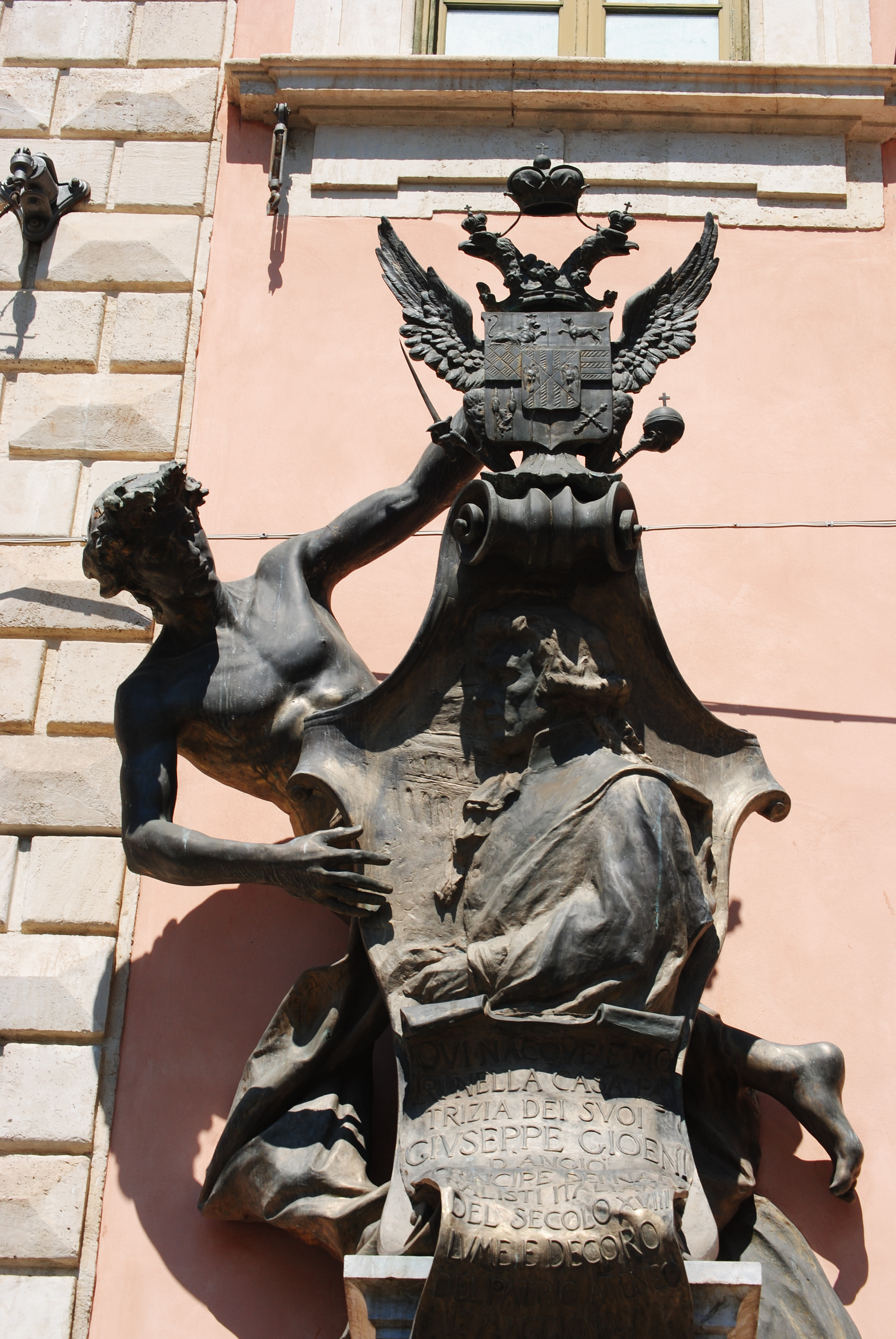
Memorial at the University of Catania

Gioeni was born in Catania to Francesco Agatino Gioeni who came from a family of the Dukes of Anjou and Agata Buglio Asmundo from the family of the Dukes of Casalmonaco. He was educated at home before graduating in philosophy in 1780. He was made chair of natural history in the University of Catania by Viceroy Colonna and here he established a museum. Gioeni met Déodat de Dolomieu in 1781 and became a friend. In 1782, he wrote about an unusual kind of rain on Etna in the Philosophical Transactions of the Royal Society of London through his connections to Sir William Hamilton with whom he corresponded. William Hamilton had been the English ambassador in the court of Naples from 1764 to 1800. This publication was based partly on phlogiston theory and based on an analysis of rain water collected within the leaves of a cabbage. He also invited Hamilton to Vesuvius and went to Naples and published an analysis in 1791. In 1788 Gioeni was made gentleman of the bedchamber of King Ferdinand IV. He also served as a tutor to the prince. He observed the Etna eruption of 1787 and kept many notes that were not published. His major output was an essay on Vesuvian lithology published in 1790. Gioeni incorrectly described a mollusc as a new species. It was based on a fragment and it even got named after him as Gioenia sicula by Bruguière in 1792 even though it was identified as an already described Scaphander lignarius by Linnaeus. Charles Babbage who was examining hoaxes and frauds in science used this example in his book on the decline of science in England of 1830. In 1811 Gioeni was held under arrest for non-payment of debts but released in 1814. After the death of Gioeni, the University of Catania established a Gioenia Academy, which was opened by Cesare Borgia on May 16, 1824.
