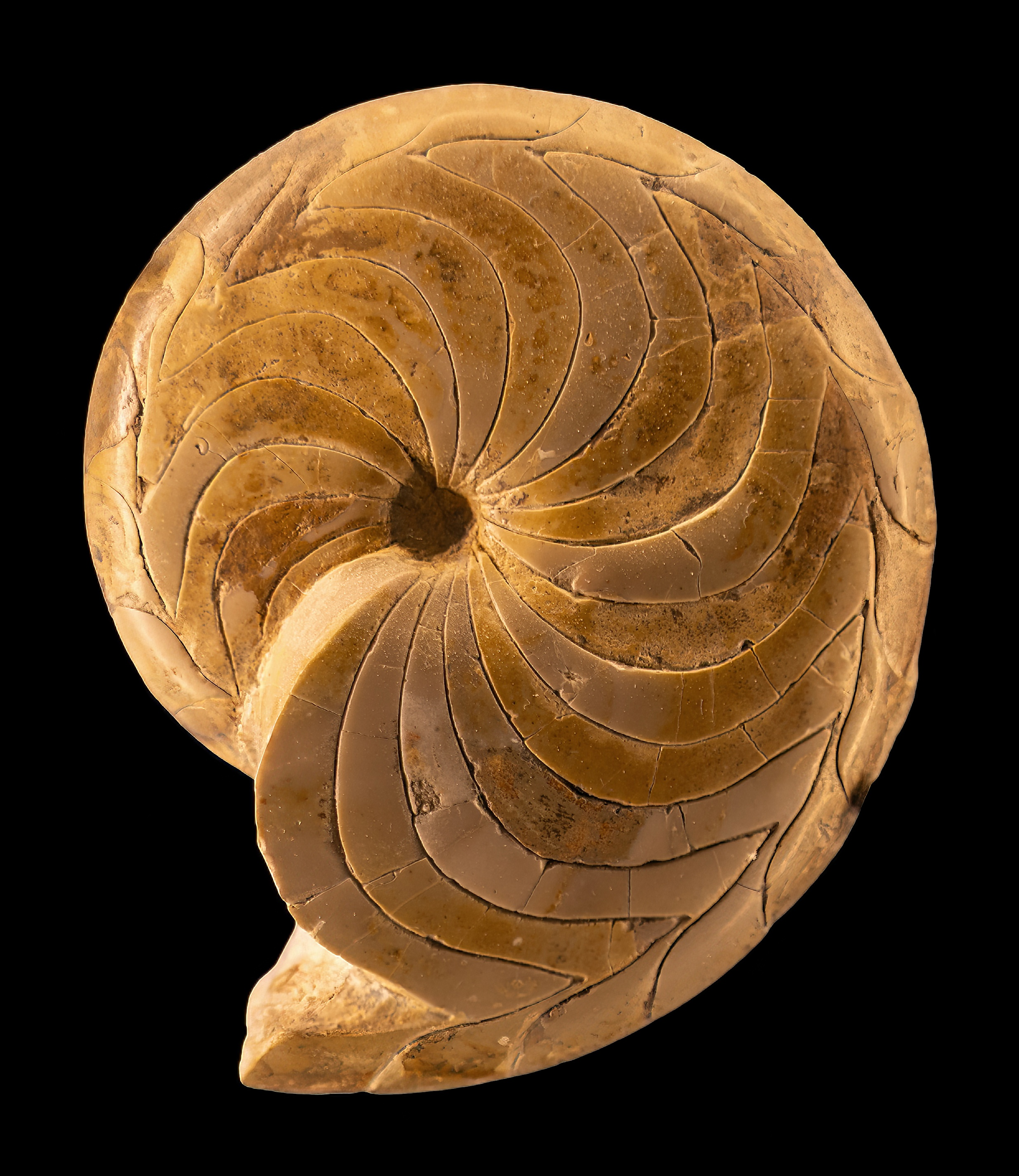
- The prionoceratid Imitoceras rotatorium. Early Carboniferous, Rockford Limestone, Rockford, Illinois.

Scientific classification
- Kingdom: Animalia
- Phylum: Mollusca
- Class: Cephalopoda
- Subclass: †Ammonoidea
- Order: †Goniatitida
- Suborder: †Tornoceratina; Wedekind, 1914

Superfamilies
- Dimeroceratoidea; Karagandoceratoidea; Praeglyphioceratoidea; Prionoceratoidea; Pseudohaloritoidea; Tornoceratoidea

= Tornoceratina =

Tornoceratina Temporal range: Middle Devonian–Middle Permian

Suborder of molluscs (fossil)

Tornoceratina is one of two suborders included in the Goniatitida, characterized by generally involute, subdiscoidal shells and by sutures in which the ventral ones are undivided.

Sutural lobes increase in number during the course of life of the individual, typically developed from the internal and external saddles. The siphuncle is prochoanitic, with septal necks projecting forward.

Derivation is from the Anarcestida in the middle Devonian.
