= Maximites =

Maximites Temporal range: Atokan to Missourian

Scientific classification
- Kingdom: Animalia
- Phylum: Mollusca
- Class: Cephalopoda
- Subclass: †Ammonoidea
- Order: †Goniatitida
- Superfamily: †Pseudohaloritoidea
- Family: †Maximitidae; Ruzhencev 1960
- Genus: †Maximites; Miller and Furnish, 1957

Extinct genus of molluscs

Maximites is a genus of Late Carboniferous ammonoids. Adult specimens were the smallest known ammonoids, only at about 1 cm (0.39 in) in diameter of shells. Fossils are found in various Late Carboniferous marine strata in North America. Maximites is the sole genus of Maximitidae, one of two families of the Superfamily Pseudohaloritoidea, an important subgroup of the order Goniatitida.

== See also ==
- Smallest organisms
