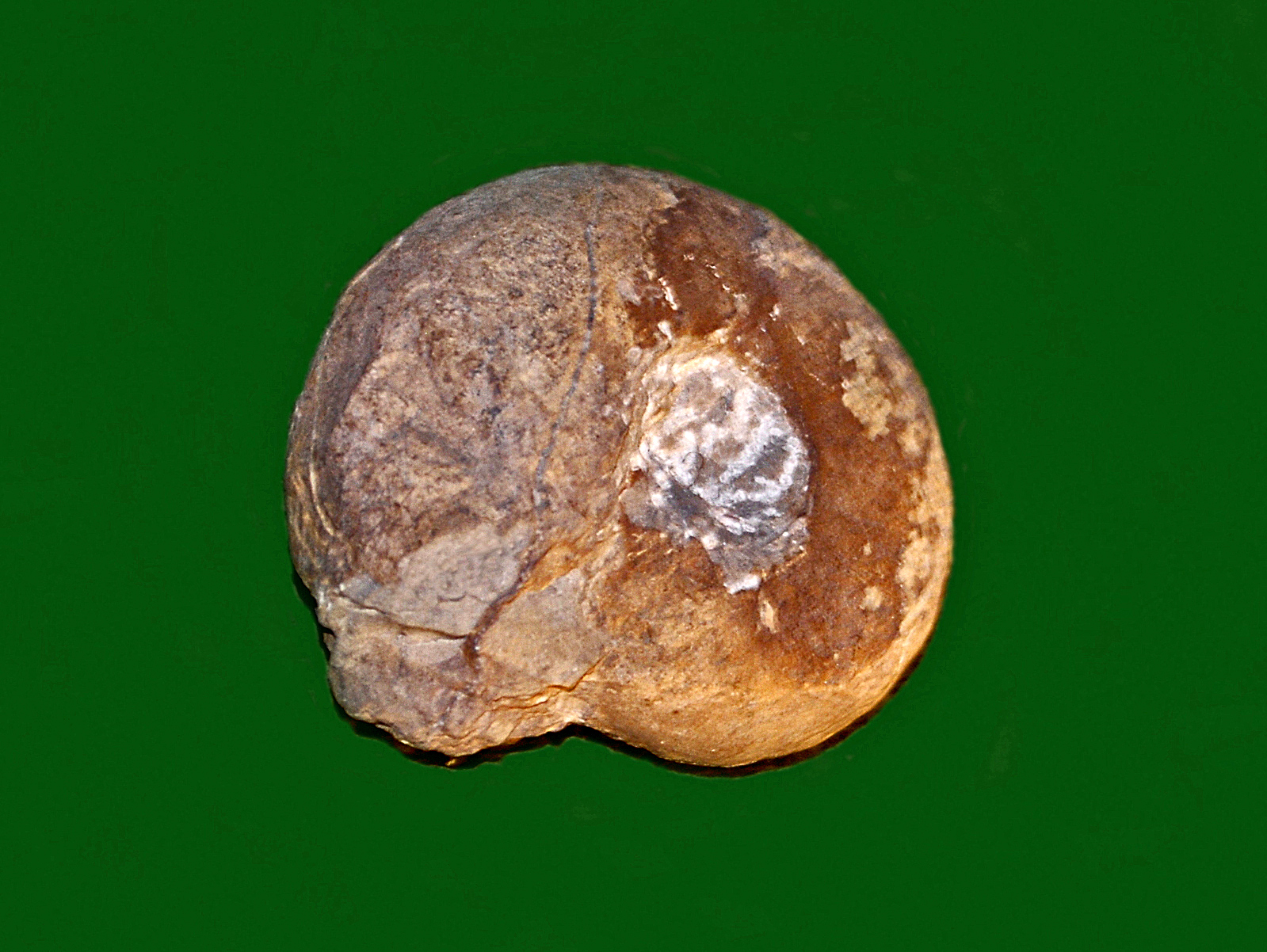
- Fossil of Goniatites bohemicus from Bavaria, on display at Galerie de paléontologie et d'anatomie comparée in Paris

Scientific classification
- Domain: Eukaryota
- Kingdom: Animalia
- Phylum: Mollusca
- Class: Cephalopoda
- Subclass: †Ammonoidea
- Order: †Goniatitida
- Suborder: †Goniatitina; Hyatt, 1884

Superfamilies
- See text

= Goniatitina =

Goniatitina Temporal range: 390–251.4 Ma Middle Devonian – Late Permian

Extinct suborder of molluscs

Goniatitina is one of two suborders included in the order Goniatitida; extinct Paleozoic ammonoid cephalopods only distantly related to the Nautiloidea.

== Taxonomy ==
The Goniatitina contains 17 defined superfamilies, listed below.

- Adrianitoidea
- Cycloloboidea
- Dimorphoceratoidea
- Gastrioceratoidea
- Goniatitoidea
- Gonioloboceratoidea
- Marathonitoidea
- Neodimorphoceratoidea
- Neoglyphioceratoidea
- Neoicoceratoidea
- Nomismoceratoidea
- Pericycloidea
- Popanoceratoidea
- Schistoceratoidea
- Shumarditoidea
- Somoholitoidea
- Thalassoceratoidea
