= Jeanne Villepreux-Power =

French biologist (1794–1871)

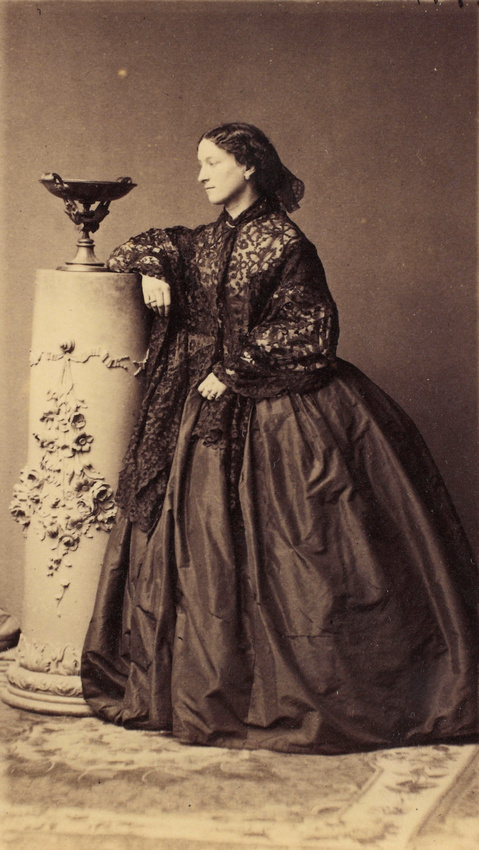
- Born: Jeanne Villepreux; September 25, 1794; Juillac, Corrèze, France
- Died: January 25, 1871 (aged 76)
- Known for: Invention of experimental aquaria
- Notable work: Observations et expériences physiques sur plusieurs animaux marins et terrestres (1839)
- Scientific career
- Fields: Marine biology
- Workplaces: Accademia Gioenia di Catania, Zoological Society of London

Jeanne Villepreux-Power, born Jeanne Villepreux (25 September 1794 – 25 January 1871), was a pioneering French marine biologist. Her research was presented to the Zoological Society of London on her behalf by Sir Richard Owen.

In 1832 she was the first person to invent and create aquaria for experimenting with aquatic organisms. The systematic application of the aquarium to study marine life which she created is still used today. As a leading researcher on cephalopods, she proved that the Argonauta argo produces its own shells, as opposed to acquiring them. Villepreux-Power was also a noted dressmaker, author and conservationist, as well as the first female member of the Accademia Gioenia di Catania in 1832.

== Early life ==
Jeanne Villepreux-Power was born in Juillac, Corrèze, on September 25, 1794, the eldest child of a shoemaker and a seamstress. She lived until age 18 in rural France, where she learned to read and write. With the exception of reading and writing, Villepreux-Power's schooling was fairly basic. Her family had to live on a strict budget and her mother died when she was eleven years old.

== Moving to Paris ==
At the age of 18, in 1812, she walked to Paris to become a dressmaker, a distance of over 400 kilometres (250 mi). The relative who was designated as her travel guardian assaulted her on the way and took her identity documents with him. She had to seek refuge in an Orleans police station until she could receive new travel documents.

Due to that delay, her employment opportunity had been given to someone else. She found another opening working as a seamstress assistant, and eventually an embroiderer. She became fairly well known and in 1816, created the wedding gown of Princess Caroline for her marriage to Charles-Ferdinand de Bourbon.

She met and married the English merchant James Power in 1818, and took the surname Villepreux-Power. The couple moved to Sicily and settled in Messina where they lived for about 25 years.

== Foray into science ==
It was after moving to Sicily that Villepreux-Power took an interest in continuing her education. She began to study geology, archeology, and natural history; in particular she made physical observations and experiments on marine and terrestrial animals. She created an inventory of the island's ecosystem during frequent walks. She was a self-taught naturalist who explored Sicily, cataloguing and commenting on its flora and fauna while gathering examples of minerals, fossils, butterflies and shells. She later compiled and published in Itinerario della Sicilia riguardante tutti i rami di storia naturale e parecchi di antichità che essa contiene and Guida per la Sicilia.

Villepreux-Power then began to make a more intent study of cephalopods and other marine life and was in need of a vessel that would allow her better access to observation over time of the same marine animals. While land animals could be observed somewhat easily, marine life was distinctly harder to examine. As such, she worked to develop a glass enclosure, ultimately developing three working models to study live marine life in and out of the water. The first was the aquarium as we know it today; the second glass surrounded by a case that was submerged in the ocean; the third an anchored cage also to be submerged in the ocean for larger marine life like mollusks. It was revolutionary at the time as she was the first to record that some species of octopuses could use tools to pry open their prey's shells.

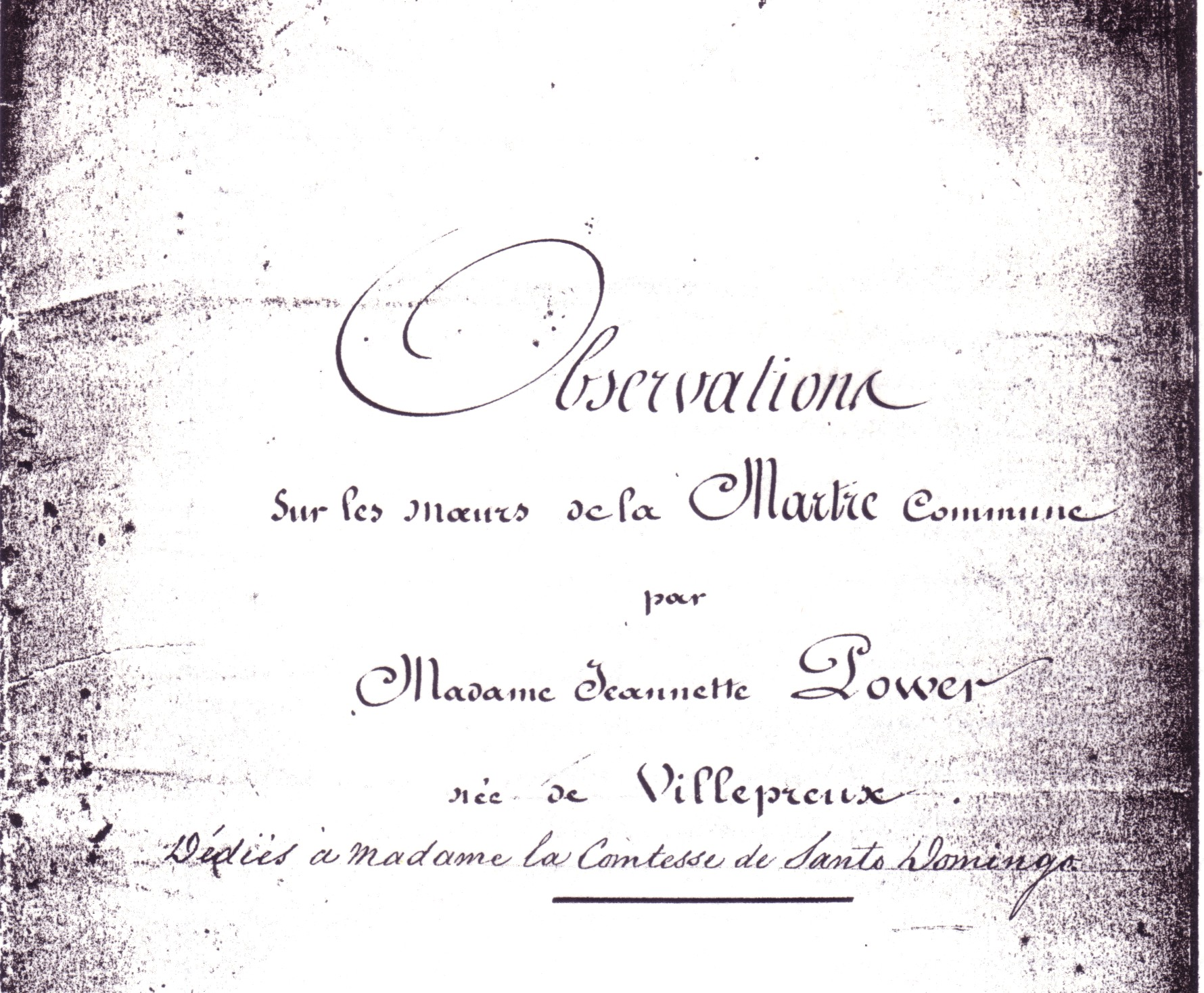
A manuscript by Jeanne Villepreux-Power.

In 1834, a professor, Carmelo Maravigna, wrote in the Giornale Letterario dell’Accademia Gioenia di Catania that Villepreux-Power should be credited with the invention of the aquarium and systematic application of it to the study of marine life. She created three types of aquarium: a glass aquarium for her study, a submersible glass one in a cage, and a cage for larger molluscs that would anchor at sea. Her first book was published in 1839 describing her experiments, called Observations et expériences physiques sur plusieurs animaux marins et terrestres.

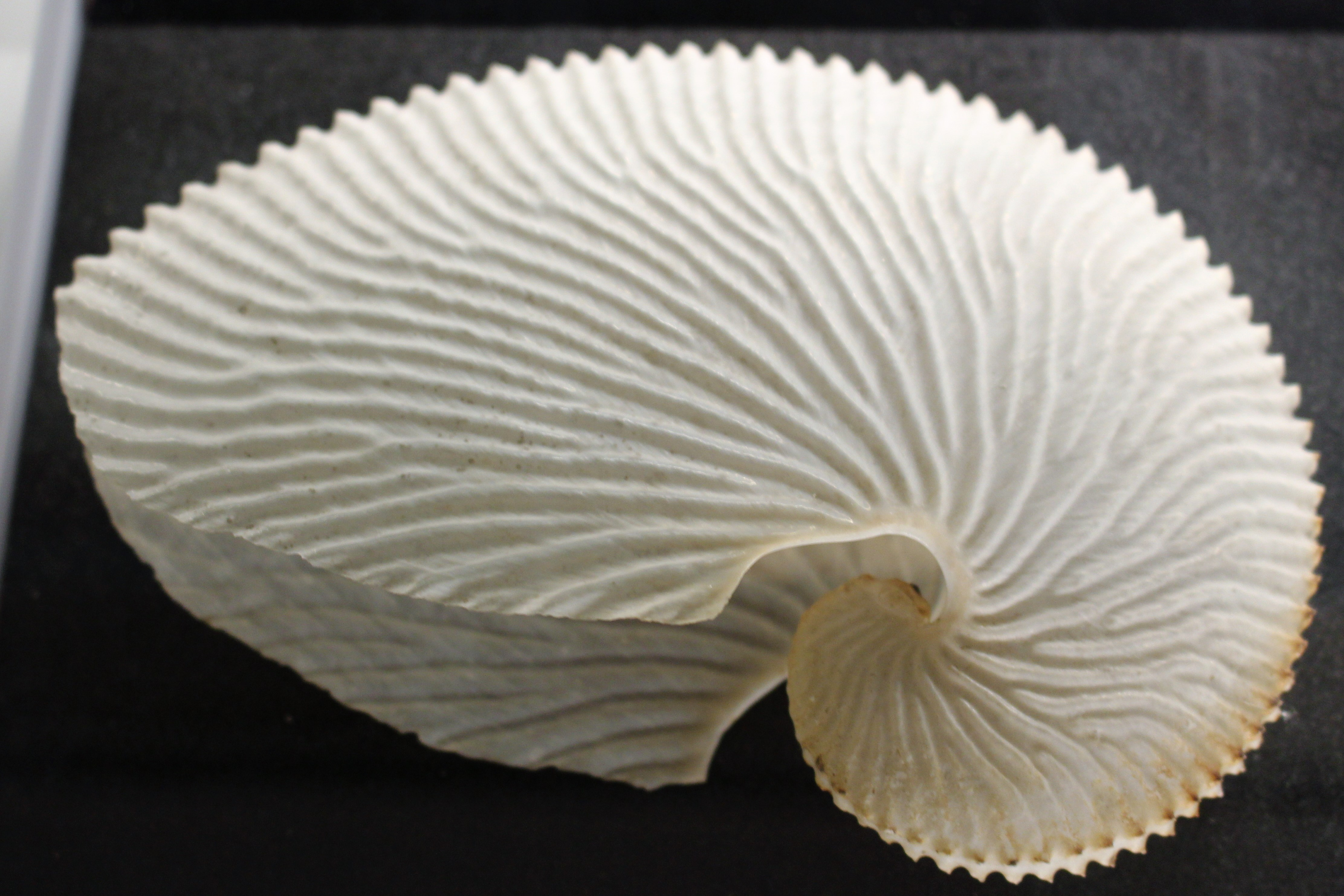
Paper nautilus (Argonauta argo)

Her second book, Guida per la Sicilia, was published in 1842. It has been republished by the Historical Society of Messina. She also studied molluscs and their fossils; in particular she favoured Argonauta argo. At the time, there was uncertainty over whether the Argonaut species produced its own shell, or acquired that of a different organism (similar to hermit crabs). Villepreux-Power's work showed that they do indeed produce their own shells. As a groundbreaking discovery, she received a considerable amount of backlash for her work.

Villepreux-Power was also concerned with conservation, and is credited with developing sustainable aquaculture principles in Sicily. She was among the first to investigate aquaculture as a means of safeguarding and restoring fish and other marine animal populations. Being intrigued also helped to find ideas of aquaculture, which is largely considered a more sustainable food source in the future, specifically through utilizing cages attached to the shore containing fish at different lifecycle stages to generate repopulation opportunities that could be moved to underpopulated rivers.

She was the first woman member of the Accademia Gioenia di Catania, and a correspondent member of the London Zoological Society and sixteen other learned societies.

== Innovation ==
Jeanne Villepreux-Power significantly brought forward the capabilities of marine biological research gained admission into prestigious scientific societies after developing one of the most significant experimental tools in marine biological research. The innovation she came up with addressed a key problem at the time, the inability to see underwater. Her solution, the first-ever glass aquarium, was a transformational innovation that changed the way marine biological research was conducted. Before it was created, studying marine species presented several difficulties for biologists. The development of marine biology as a scientific field was hampered by the incapacity to efficiently investigate these organisms in their native habitats. This problem was a significant pain point and was resolved by Villepreux-Power's idea, which helped scientists learn more about the biology and behavior of marine life. Jeanne Villepreux-Power created different models of the glass aquarium, one that could observe creatures in shallow waters, and a cage-like design that could be lowered to different depths, Furthering the capabilities of marine biology research. For her outstanding work in the field of Marine Biology Villepreux-Power became the first female member of the Catania Accademia, as well as many other scientific academies.

Villepreux-Power's innovation is still in use today; although it has been improved many times, the core idea remains. There are more than 200 marine aquariums and ocean life centers across the globe. The modern day style of the glass aquarium created by Villepreux-Power was developed by the British biologist Philip Gosse (1810–1888). The first public aquarium opened in London in 1853, and Gosse supplied the units displayed there. Aquaria became popular among the middle classes. Following London, the Berlin Aquarium Unter den Linden opened its doors in 1869, and the Public Aquarium of Trocadero (Paris) opened its doors in 1867.

== Late life ==
Since women were not permitted to give talks at academic conferences, enroll in colleges, or work in the scientific community, her results were disseminated around the globe via a proxy. Her research was presented to the Zoological Society of London on her behalf by Sir Richard Owen, the preeminent scientist in Britain before Charles Darwin. They had been communicating with one another throughout her experiments. Her research was swiftly published in German, French, and English and rapidly dispersed throughout Europe.

Villepreux-Power and her husband left Sicily in 1843, and many of her records and scientific drawings were lost in a shipwreck. Although she continued to write, she conducted no further research. She did, however, become a public speaker. She and husband divided their time between Paris and London. She fled Paris during a siege by the Prussian Army in the winter of 1870, returning to Juilliac. She died in January 1871.

== Commemoration ==
It was not until much later, in 1997, that Jeanne Villepreux-Power's work was rediscovered after she had been forgotten for more than a century. In 1997 her name, "Villepreux-Power," was given to a crater on Venus discovered by the Magellan probe.

In 2026, Villepreux was announced as one of 72 historical women in STEM whose names have been proposed to be added to the 72 men already celebrated on the Eiffel Tower. The plan was announced by the Mayor of Paris, Anne Hidalgo following the recommendations of a committee led by Isabelle Vauglin of Femmes et Sciences and Jean-François Martins, representing the operating company which runs the Eiffel Tower.

== Popular culture ==
A biographical song about Villepreux is featured on 26 Scientists Volume Two: Newton to Zeno, a 2008 album by the California band Artichoke.

Secrets of the Sea: The Story of Jeanne Power, Revolutionary Marine Scientist, a 2021 biographical picture book by Evan Griffith and illustrated by Joanie Stone, adapts the story of Villepreux-Power's discoveries and legacy into an educational children's book.

== See also ==
- Timeline of women in science
