= Dimorphoceratoidea =

Dimorphoceratoidea Temporal range: Late Paleozoic

Scientific classification
- Domain: Eukaryota
- Kingdom: Animalia
- Phylum: Mollusca
- Class: Cephalopoda
- Subclass: †Ammonoidea
- Order: †Goniatitida
- Suborder: †Goniatitina
- Superfamily: †Dimorphoceratoidea; Hyatt 1931

Families
- Berkhoceratidae; Dimorphoceratidae

Synonyms
- Dimorphocerataceae

Extinct superfamily of molluscs

Dimorphoceratoidea is one of seventeen superfamilies included in the ammonoid suborder Goniatitina, a variety of shelled cephalopods that lived during the late Paleozoic.

The Dimorphoceratoidea can be described as Goniatitina with subdiscoidal to lenticular shells that have conspicuous closed umbilici and goniatitic sutures with long prominently bifid ventral lobes and more or less subdivided external lobes.
