= Dimorphoceratidae =

Dimorphoceratidae Temporal range: Late Paleozoic

Scientific classification
- Domain: Eukaryota
- Kingdom: Animalia
- Phylum: Mollusca
- Class: Cephalopoda
- Subclass: †Ammonoidea
- Order: †Goniatitida
- Superfamily: †Dimorphoceratoidea
- Family: †Dimorphoceratidae; Hyatt 1884

Subfamilies
- Dimorphoceratinae; Glyphiolobinae

Extinct family of molluscs

Dimorphoceratidae is one of two families included in the Dimorphoceratoidea, a superfamily of ammonoid cephalopods belonging to the Goniatitida that lived during the Late Paleozoic. They are dimorphocerataceans in which the external lateral lobes and prongs of the ventral lobe are bifid. The shells are strongly involute, subdiscoidal to lenticular.
