= Carlo Gemmellaro =

Italian naturalist and geologist

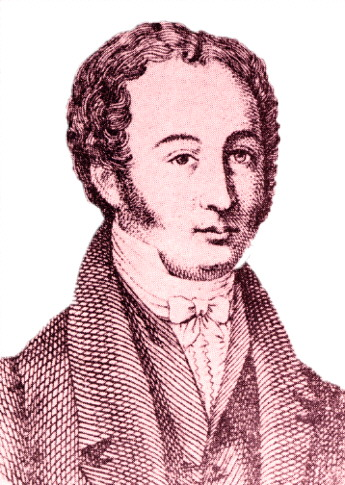
- Born: 14 November 1787; Nicolosi (Kingdom of Sicily)
- Died: 22 October 1866 (aged 78); Catania (Kingdom of Italy)
- Occupation: Naturalist, geologist, surgeon

Carlo Gemmellaro (1787–1866) was an Italian naturalist and geologist. He was noted for his studies on the vulcanology of his native Sicily. His son Gaetano Giorgio Gemmellaro was a noted geologist, paleontologist and politician, who served as rector of the University of Palermo.

== Biography ==
Carlo was born to a prominent family; his uncle had performed observations on the eruptions of Mount Etna. Carlo studied medicine at the University of Catania, and began practicing as a physician in Messina. His brother, Giuseppe Gemmellaro, became a prominent physician in Catania. In 1812, he traveled to London where he first explored his interests in geology. He gained a position as a physician for the British navy, allowing him to travel through the Mediterranean from 1813-1817. In 1817, he returned to private practice of medicine in Catania, but continued his interests in geology, creating a museum of mineralogy and geology at his home.

In 1824, he helped found the Gioenia Academy of Sciences of Catania. He was appointed professor of Geology and Mineralogy at the University of Catania in 1830. The events of 1837, when an epidemic of cholera afflicted Catania, fomented rebellion in the town, Carlo went on to publicly criticize the response of the autocratic Bourbon monarchy. Now suspect in the eyes of the government, his ability to travel was restricted. With his actions and words during the revolutions of 1848 that convulsed the kingdom, Carlo further antagonized the central government, and only with the founding of the Kingdom of Italy, was he able to regain prestige and appointments. Two of his children fought with Garibaldi in Sicily and the Neapolitan mainland.

== Works ==
As volcanologist, he studied Etna in Sicily; his studies are summarized in the monograph Vulcanologia dell'Etna 1859-1860 which is certainly the most mature product of the Gemmellaro research, synthesis of observations carried for decades and successful attempt of a modern volcanic theory. His last work, Un addio al maggior vulcano d'Europa ("A farewell to the greatest volcano in Europe") as well as a brief autobiography, is also an emotional farewell to the main object of his scientific studies.
