= Pseudohaloritidae =

Pseudohaloritidae Temporal range: Middle Pennsylvanian - Upper Permian
- Pseudohalorites sp, Shanghai Natural History Museum

Scientific classification
- Kingdom: Animalia
- Phylum: Mollusca
- Class: Cephalopoda
- Subclass: †Ammonoidea
- Order: †Goniatitida
- Superfamily: †Pseudohaloritoidea
- Family: †Pseudohaloritidae; Miller & Furnish, 1957

Subfamilies
- Pseudohaloritinae; Shouchangoceratinae; Yinoceratinae

Family of Pseudohaloritoidea

Pseudohaloritidae is the larger of two families that form the goniatitid superfamily Pseudohaloritoidea, the other being the monogenerc Maximitidae. They are part of the vast array of shelled cephalopods known as ammonoids that are more closely related to squids, belemnites, octopuses, and cuttlefish, than to the superficially similar Nautilus.

The Pseudohaloritide which now contains some 14 genera in three subfamilies is characterized by small, subdiscoidal to subglobular, involute shells, the surface of which may be smooth or with coarse longitudinal lirae and/or transverse ribs. The siphuncle is retrosiphonitic, a hold-over character from the nautiloids, usually subcentral or situated within dorsal septal flexure but ventral-marginal in first and second whorls. Sutures have four pairs of lobes, the ventral one being rounded and spatulate, the interior three clustered and narrow. External lobes are either smooth are variably serrate.

The Pseudohaloritidae was established by Miller and Furnish (1957) for three related genera with similar sutures and aberrant siphuncles that are removed from the ventral margin. One, Maximites, has been put in a family of its own, the Maximitidae. The other two, Neoaganides and Pseudohalorites are retained in the Pseudohaloritidae, to which has been added about a dozen more genera, mostly from China.

Maximites differs in having a bifid ventral lobe and a siphuncle that is ventral, but not marginal. It is also older, as early as the Middle Pennsylvanian (m U Carb) rather than from the Upper Pennsylvanian (uU Carb) when pseudohaloritids, as emended, make their first appearance. Maximites is thought to have given rise to the Neoaganides and thus to the Pseudohaloritidae, and in turn may have been derived from Imitoceras. On the other hand, the suture indicates that Neoaganides may have developed directly from Imitoceras. The ventral lobe of Neoaganides is like that of Imitoceras, smooth and rounded, but the lateral lobes differ from those of both Imitoceras and Maximites in being pointed.

The aberrant position of the siphuncle well away from the ventral margin and in some near the dorsum is characteristic of, although not unique to, this family. However no link is indicated between these Pennsylvanian and Permian forms and the Upper Devonian Clymeniids with their well established dorso-marginal siphuncles.
