= Gaetano Giorgio Gemmellaro =

Italian geologist, paleontologist and politician

Gaetano Giorgio Gemmellaro (24 February 1832, in Catania – 16 March 1904, in Palermo) was an Italian geologist, paleontologist and politician.

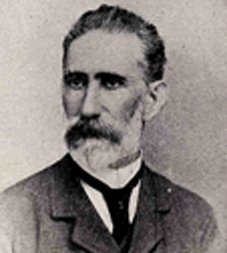
Gaetano Giorgio Gemmellaro

== Biography ==
Gemmellaro was the son of Carlo Gemmellaro, a teacher of geology at the University of Catania. He studied medicine, specialising in ophthalmology at the University of Naples Federico II. Here he met Arcangelo Scacchi, who introduced him to natural sciences, specifically geology and mineralogy, disciplines in which Gemmellaro published a series of memoirs. In 1858, he was appointed special professor of geology and mineralogy at the University of Catania.

During this time, he met the English geologist Charles Lyell, who employed Gemmellaro to study the stratigraphy of the Etna lava, in exchange for two publications in the annals of the Geological Society of London.

In 1860, he was commissioned by the British Government to conduct geological surveys of the Canary Islands. During the trip, however, learning of Giuseppe Garibaldi's landing in Sicily, he decided to return promptly, to join the Garibaldi and take part in the Palermo clashes with his brother Ferdinando. This experience resulted, in the same year, in political and academic positions, in that Antonio Mordini, pro-dictator of Sicily, appointed him Secretary of State for Public Education and full professor of the University of Palermo.

Gemmellaro created the first university collection of geology and paleontology by founding, in 1866, the museum which today bears his name. He discovered layers of paleozoic fossils in the Sosio river valley, which proved useful for reconstructing the genetic link of the ammonites, in comparison with similar material from Tibet, Texas and the Alps.

He was rector of the Palermo university from 1874 to 1876 and, again, from 1881 to 1883. President of the Italian Geological Society in 1891, Gemmellaro was appointed senator in 1892.

Gemmellaro married Maria Pantaleo, with whom on 18 December 1879 he had a son, Mariano, who died early in 1921 after following in his father's footsteps at the University of Palermo.

== Publications ==
- Sul graduale sollevamento di una parte della costa di Sicilia dal Simeto all'Onobola, XIV (1858), pp. 504–508 (in Atti dell'Acc. Gioenia in Catania, s. 2, XIV [1859], pp. 87–98)
- Sulle conchiglie fossili del Turoniano e Senoniano di Catenanuova e di Turcisi (in Giornale dell'Acc. Gioenia in Catania, n.s., V [1859], p. 63)
- Sopra due nuovi generi di Brachiopodi provenienti dai calcari con fusulina della provincia di Palermo / per Gaetano Giorgio Gemmellaro. (full text of book at Biodiversity Heritage Library)
- La fauna dei calcari con Fusulina della valle del fiume Sosio nella provincia de Palermo. By Gemmellaro, Gaetano Giorgio, 1832–1904. (Full text of book at Biodiversity Heritage Library)

== Related items ==
- Museo di paleontologia e geologia Gaetano Giorgio Gemmellaro affiliated with the University of Palermo.
