= Goniatite =

Goniatite Temporal range: 390–251.9 Ma Middle Devonian – Late Permian
- A polished goniatite fossil

Scientific classification
- Kingdom: Animalia
- Phylum: Mollusca
- Class: Cephalopoda
- Subclass: †Ammonoidea
- Order: †Goniatitida; Hyatt, 1884

Suborders
- Goniatitina; Tornoceratina

Extinct order of molluscs

Goniatites are ammonoid cephalopods that form the order Goniatitida, derived from the more basal Agoniatitida during the Middle Devonian some 390 million years ago (around Eifelian stage). Goniatites (goniatitids) survived the Late Devonian extinction to flourish during the Carboniferous and Permian only to become extinct at the end of the Permian some 139 million years later.

== Morphology ==
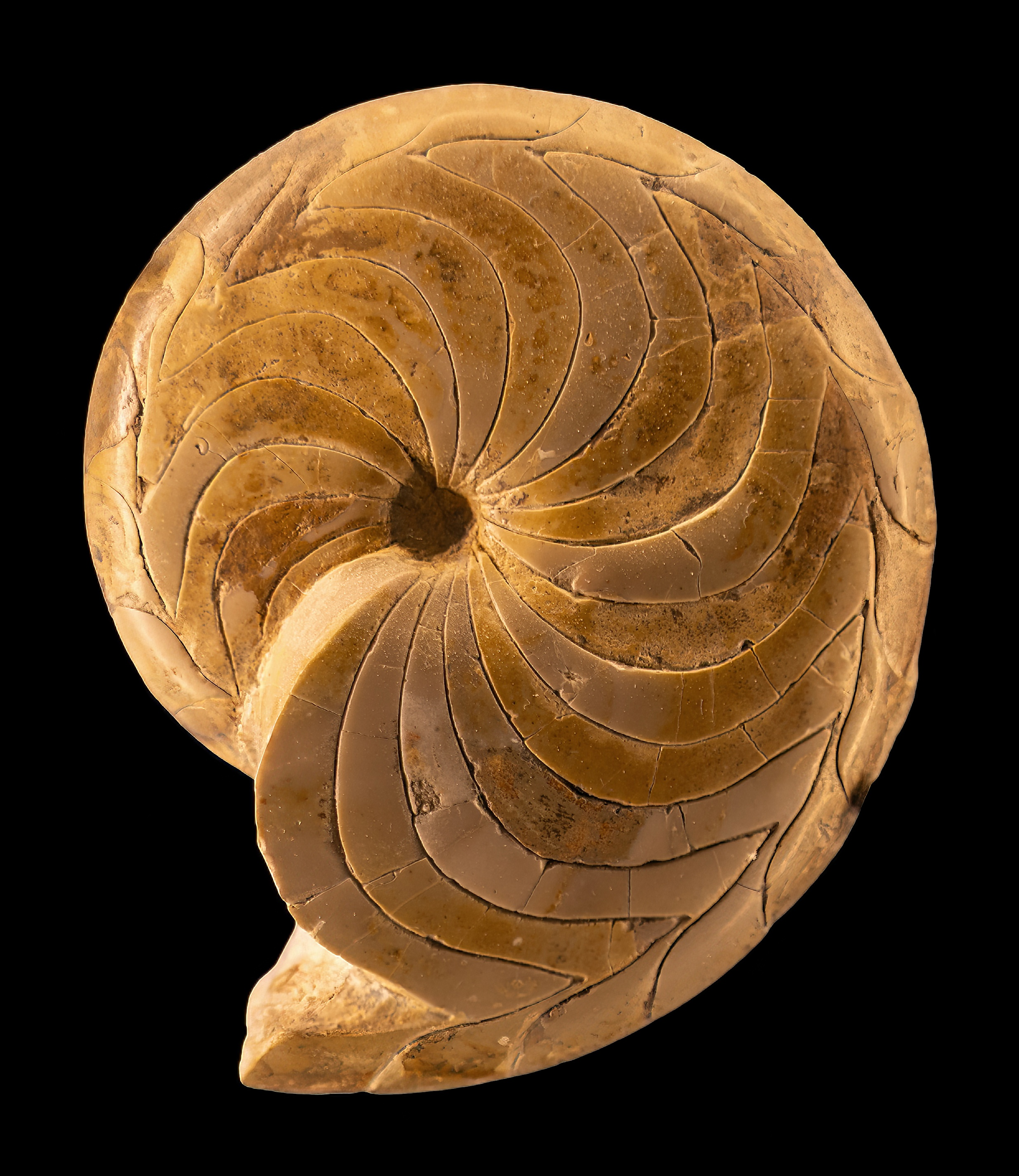
The prionoceratid Imitoceras rotatorium, showing characteristic goniatitic sutures. Early Carboniferous, Rockford Limestone, Rockford, Illinois.

All goniatites possessed an external shell, which is divided internally into chambers filled with gas giving it buoyancy during the life of the animal. An open chamber at the front of the shell provided living space for the goniatitid animal, with access to open water through a ventral siphuncle. The general morphology and habit of goniatites was probably similar to that of their later relatives the ammonites, being free swimming and possessing a head with two well developed eyes and arms (or tentacles).

Goniatite shells are small to medium in size, almost always less than 15 centimeters (5.9 inches) in diameter and often smaller than 5 centimeters (2.0 inches) in diameter. The shell is always planispirally coiled, unlike those of Mesozoic ammonites in which some are trochoidal and even aberrant (called heteromorphs). Goniatitid shells vary in form from thinly discoidal to broadly globular and may be smooth or distinctly ornamented. Their shape suggests many were poor swimmers.

The thin walls between the internal chambers of the shell are called the septa, and as the goniatite grew it would move its body forward in the shell secreting septa behind it, thereby adding new chambers to the shell. The sutures (or suture lines) are visible as a series of narrow, wavy lines on the surface of the shell. The sutures appear where each septa contacts the wall of the outer shell.

The typical goniatitid has a suture with smooth saddles and lobes, which gives the name "goniatitic" to this particular suture pattern. In some the sutures have a distinctive "zigzag" pattern. Not all goniatitid ammonoides have goniatitic sutures. In some the sutures are ceratitic, in others, even ammonitic. Nor are goniatitic sutures limited to the Goniatitida. The sutures of nautiloids are by comparison somewhat simpler, being either straight or slightly curved, whereas later ammonoids showed suture patterns of increasing complexity. One explanation for this increasing extravagancy in suture pattern is that it leads to a higher strength of the shell.

== Ecology ==
Ecologically, goniatites were limited to environments of normal-marine salinity—as appears to be the case for all cephalopods throughout their history. Goniatites are much more abundant and speciose in sediments that represent epicontinental seas than they are in those that represent the open ocean. Within these inland seas, goniatites' greatest abundance and diversity appears to have been achieved in deeper offshore and basinal environments rather than in nearshore environments. Known nearshore (e.g., lagoonal) occurrences have generally been ascribed to wash-in of shells from offshore waters.

Due to lack of strong evidence for any particular life mode (e.g., benthic, nektonic, and planktonic), it remains unclear what resources goniatites were capitalizing on in these offshore environments. Only a few goniatites' full trophic apparatuses have ever been described, and reports of stomach contents in these creatures' fossils remain questionable at best. However, goniatites clearly lacked the calcified jaw apparatuses developed in later ammonites; this has been cited as evidence against their having a durophagous (shell-crushing) diet.

== Distribution ==
Goniatites are found in North America, Europe, North Africa and Australasia where they are used as index fossils in age determination and stratigraphic correlation. However, they seem to occur mostly in areas which at the time would have been tropical to subtropical. Almost any fossil-bearing limestone or shale from inland seas of the late Paleozoic tropics or subtropics is likely to yield some goniatites. In the USA, such rocks are found from Maine, New York, and Virginia and in every state west to Nebraska and south to Texas and Alabama; as well as in parts of almost every western state (with the exception of North Dakota, Oregon, Washington, and Hawaii).

Notable goniatite occurrences are found in certain limestones in western part of Ireland (particularly Slieve Anierin) which are packed with beautifully preserved goniatite fossils. They are also found in marine bands of the Carboniferous coal measures in Europe and in marine rocks of the Pennsylvanian period in Arkansas. Large numbers of goniatites also occur in rocks from the Devonian period of Morocco.
