= Vidrioceratinae =

Scientific classification
- Kingdom: Animalia
- Phylum: Mollusca
- Class: Cephalopoda
- Subclass: †Ammonoidea
- Order: †Goniatitida
- Family: †Vidrioceratidae
- Subfamily: †Vidrioceratinae; Plummer & Scott 1939

Genera
- Leeites; Pamirites; Peritrochia; Prostacheoceras; Tabantalites; Vidrioceras

Extinct subfamily of molluscs

Vidrioceratinae is one of two subfamilies of the Vidrioceratidae family. They are an extinct group of ammonoid, which are shelled cephalopods related to squids, belemnites, octopuses, and cuttlefish, and more distantly to the nautiloids.
