= Neostacheoceratidae =

Scientific classification
- Kingdom: Animalia
- Phylum: Mollusca
- Class: Cephalopoda
- Subclass: †Ammonoidea
- Order: †Goniatitida
- Superfamily: †Cycloloboidea
- Family: †Neostacheoceratidae; Toumansky, 1939

Subfamilies
- Glassoceratinae; Nostacheoceratinae

Extinct family of molluscs

Neostacheoceratidae is one of three families of the Cyclolobaceae superfamily. They are an extinct group of ammonoid, which are shelled cephalopods related to squids, belemnites, octopuses, and cuttlefish, and more distantly to the nautiloids.

The following genera are included:

Glassoceratinae Ruzhencev, 1960

- Glassoceras
- Neoglassoceras
- Subglassoceras

Nostacheoceratinae Toumansky, 1939

- Chengxianites
- Furnishites
- Martoceras
- Neostacheoceras
- Stacheoceras
- Waagenina
