= List of the Paleozoic life of California =

This list of the Paleozoic life of California contains the various prehistoric life-forms whose fossilized remains have been reported from within the US state of California and are between 538.8 and 252.17 million years of age.

== A ==
- †Acanthopecten
- †Acidiphorus
  - †Acidiphorus hesperia
- †Advenella
  - †Advenella bifurcata
- †Agathiceras
- †Alaskospira
  - †Alaskospira dunbari – or unidentified comparable form
- †Albertella
  - †Albertella longwelli
- †Alitaria – tentative report
- †Allosaccus – tentative report
- †Alokistocare
- †Alokistocarella
  - †Alokistocarella brighamensis – or unidentified comparable form
- †Amblysiphonella
  - †Amblysiphonella grossa
- †Amblysiphonelloides
  - †Amblysiphonelloides reticulata
  - †Amblysiphonelloides tubulara
- †Ambocoelia – tentative report
- †Amecephalus
  - †Amecephalus arrojosensis
- †Ampyx – tentative report
- †Ampyx
  - †Ampyx compactus
- †Anidanthus
  - †Anidanthus shastensis – type locality for species
- †Annuliconcha
- †Anomalorthis
- †Anoptambonites
  - †Anoptambonites myiomorpheus – type locality for species
  - †Anoptambonites myriomorpheus
- †Antiquatonia
- †Apatolichas
- †Arceodomus
  - †Arceodomus langenheimi – type locality for species
- †Archaeoscyphia
  - †Archaeoscyphia mazourkaensis – type locality for species
- †Arcullina
  - †Arcullina polaris – or unidentified related form
- †Arcuolenellus
  - †Arcuolenellus megafrontalis – or unidentified comparable form
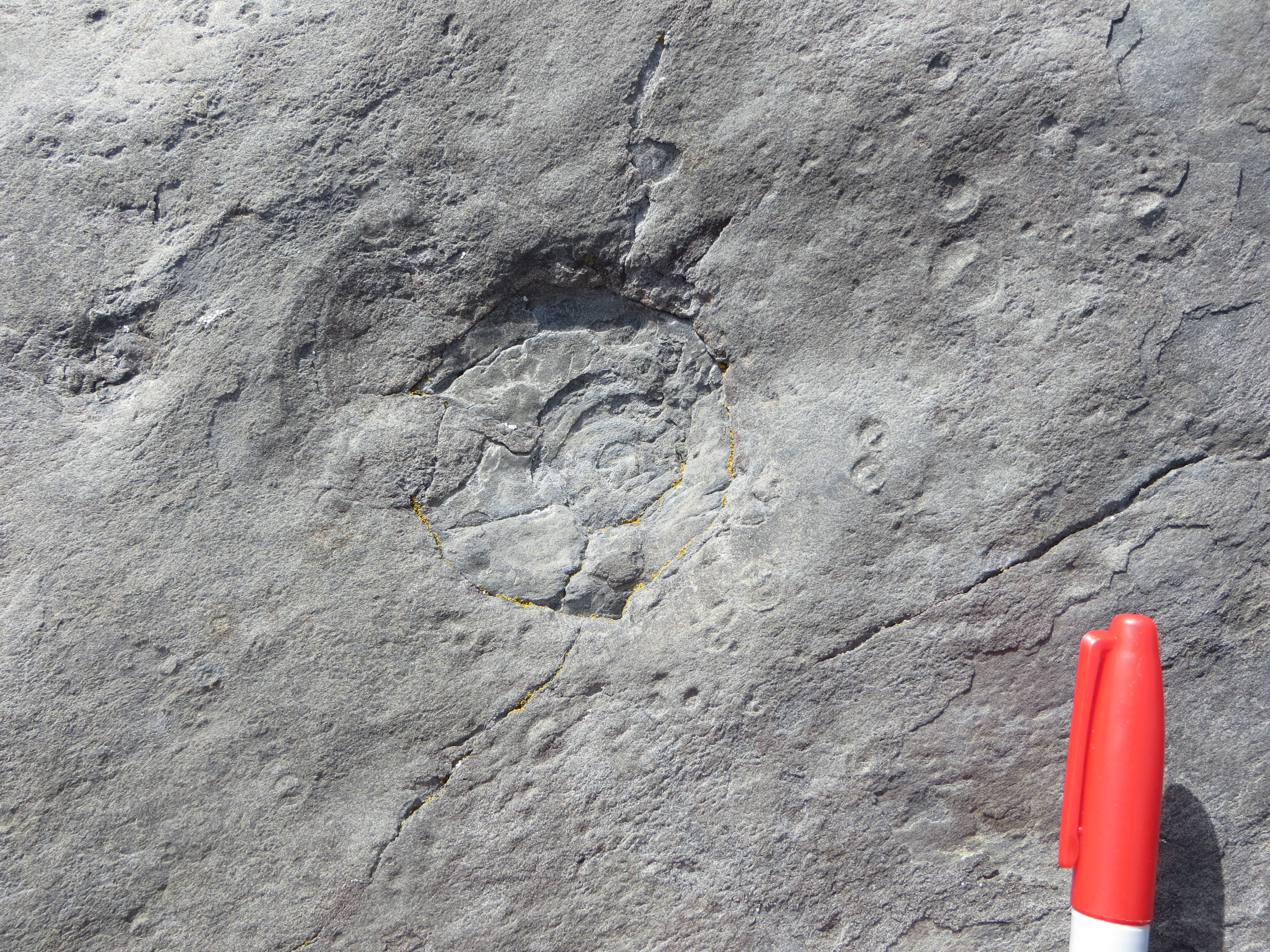
- Fossil of the mysterious Ediacaran organism Aspidella
  †Aspidella – tentative report
  - †Aspidella terranovica
- †Astartella
- †Atrypa
  - †Atrypa reticularis
- †Atrypella
  - †Atrypella tenuis – or unidentified comparable form
- †Atrypoidea – tentative report
- †Aulophyllum – tentative report
- †Austinella
  - †Austinella kankakensis – or unidentified related form
  - †Austinella kankakesis – or unidentified related form
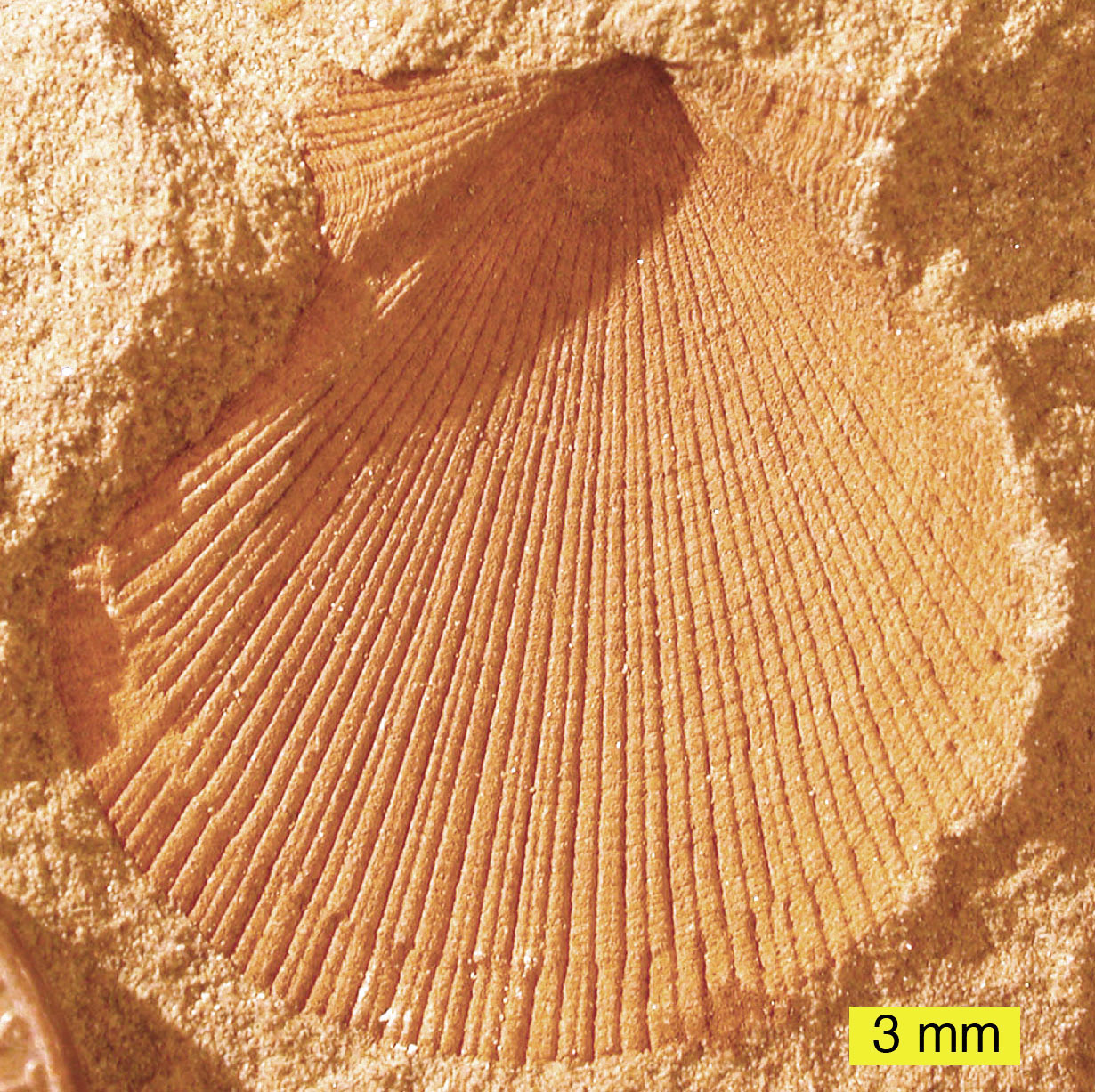
- Mold fossil of a shell of the Early Devonian-Late Triassic bivalve Aviculopecten
  †Aviculopecten
  - †Aviculopecten dissimilis
  - †Aviculopecten fimbriatus
  - †Aviculopecten occidentalis – or unidentified comparable form

== B ==
- †Bakevellia
- †Bathymyonia
  - †Bathymyonia nevadensis – or unidentified comparable form
- †Bayhaium
  - †Bayhaium merriamorum
  - †Bayhaium virginiae – type locality for species
- †Bellefontia
- †Beraunia
  - †Beraunia bifrons – or unidentified comparable form
- †Bicarina
  - †Bicarina petilitornata
- †Biformispira – type locality for genus
  - †Biformispira isaacsoni – type locality for species
- †Bighornia
- †Bimuria
- †Blastoidocrinus
  - †Blastoidocrinus carchariaedens – or unidentified comparable form
- †Bolbolenellus
  - †Bolbolenellus brevispinus
  - †Bolbolenellus euryparia
- †Bonnia
- †Boucotspira – type locality for genus
  - †Boucotspira fimbriata – type locality for species
- †Brachyprion
  - †Brachyprion seretensis – or unidentified comparable form
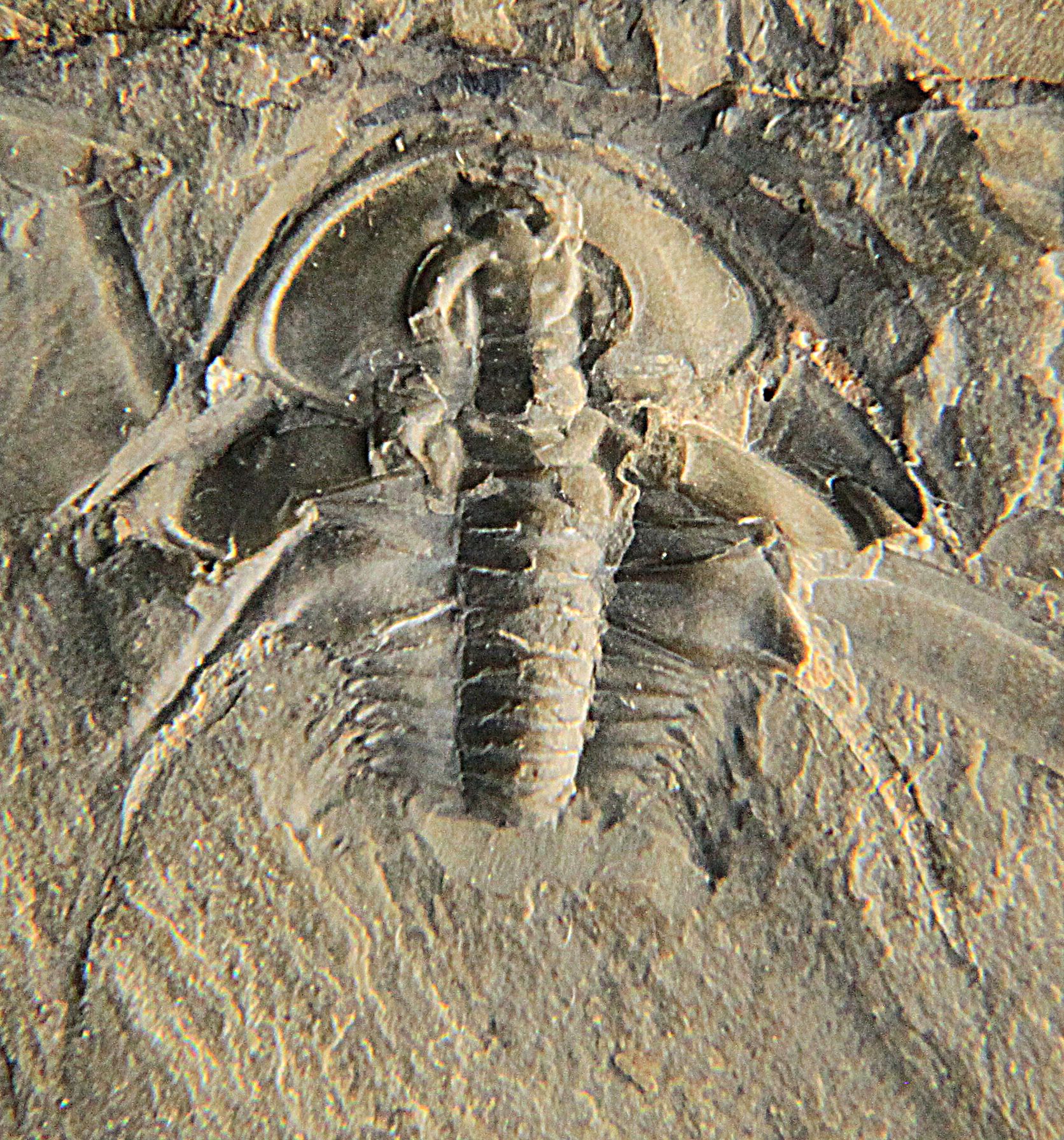
- Fossil of the Cambrian trilobite Bristolia
  †Bristolia
  - †Bristolia anteros
  - †Bristolia brachyomma
  - †Bristolia bristolensis
  - †Bristolia fragilis
  - †Bristolia insolens
  - †Bristolia mohavensis
- †Bryorhynchus – report made of unidentified related form or using admittedly obsolete nomenclature
  - †Bryorhynchus bisulcatum
- †Bumastus
- †Buxtonia
  - †Buxtonia scabriculoides
  - †Buxtonia websteri – or unidentified comparable form

== C ==
- †Calycocoelia
  - †Calycocoelia typicalis – type locality for species
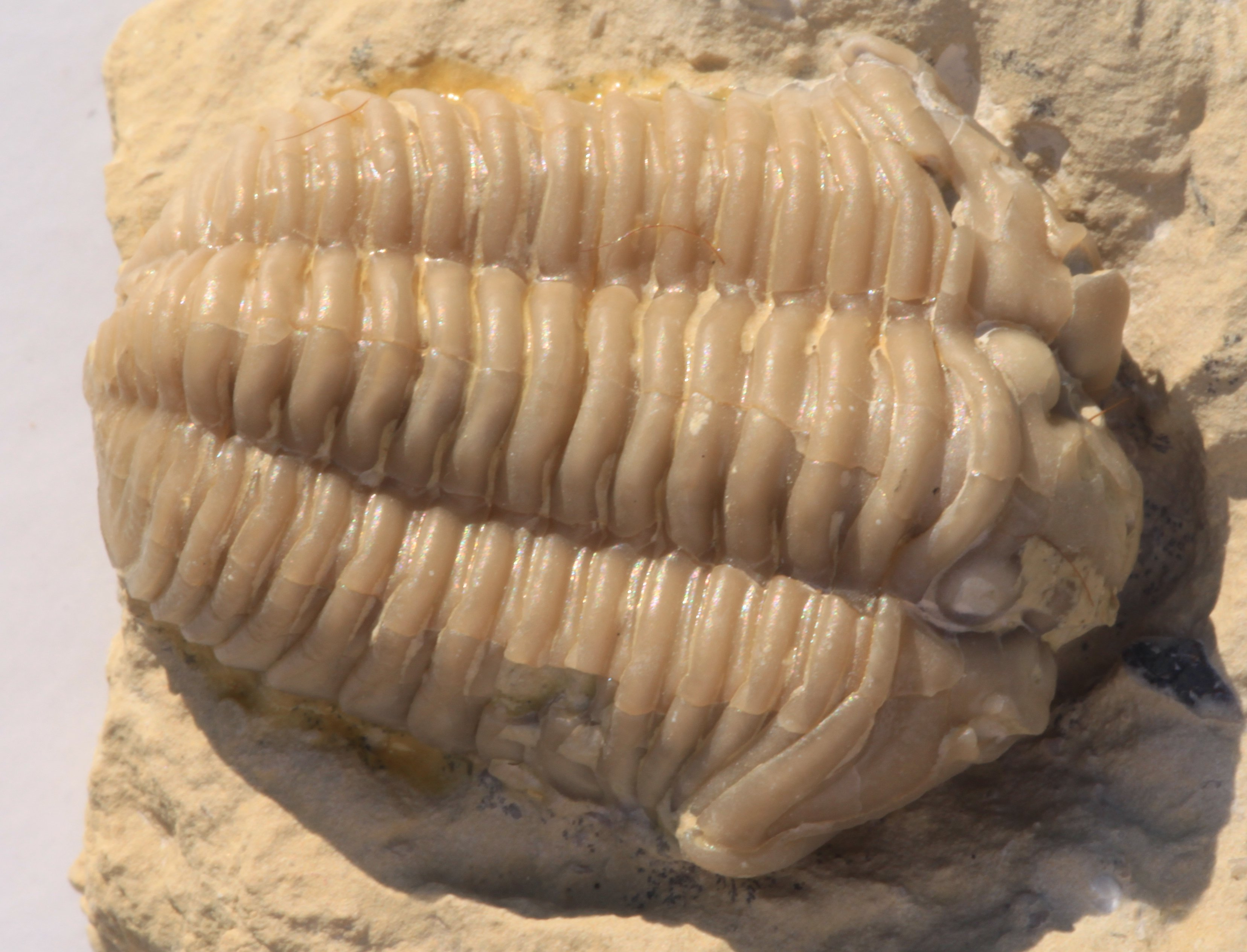
- Fossil of the Early Ordovician-Early Devonian trilobite Calymene
  †Calymene
- †Camarotoechia – tentative report
- †Cancrinella
  - †Cancrinella phosphatica
  - †Cancrinella undata
- †Carolinites
  - †Carolinites genacinaca
  - †Carolinites sibiricus
- †Chalaroschwagerina
  - †Chalaroschwagerina inflata – type locality for species
  - †Chalaroschwagerina obesa – type locality for species
  - †Chalaroschwagerina pulchra – type locality for species
  - †Chalaroschwagerina tumentis – type locality for species
- †Cheilocephalus
- †Chonetes
- †Chonetinella
- †Choristitella
- †Cladopora
- †Clavicosta – tentative report
- †Cleiothyridina
- †Clelandia
  - †Clelandia aspina
  - †Clelandia bispina
- †Cliefdenella
  - †Cliefdenella alaskaensis
- †Clisiophyllum
  - †Clisiophyllum gabbi
  - †Clisiophyllum oweni – type locality for species
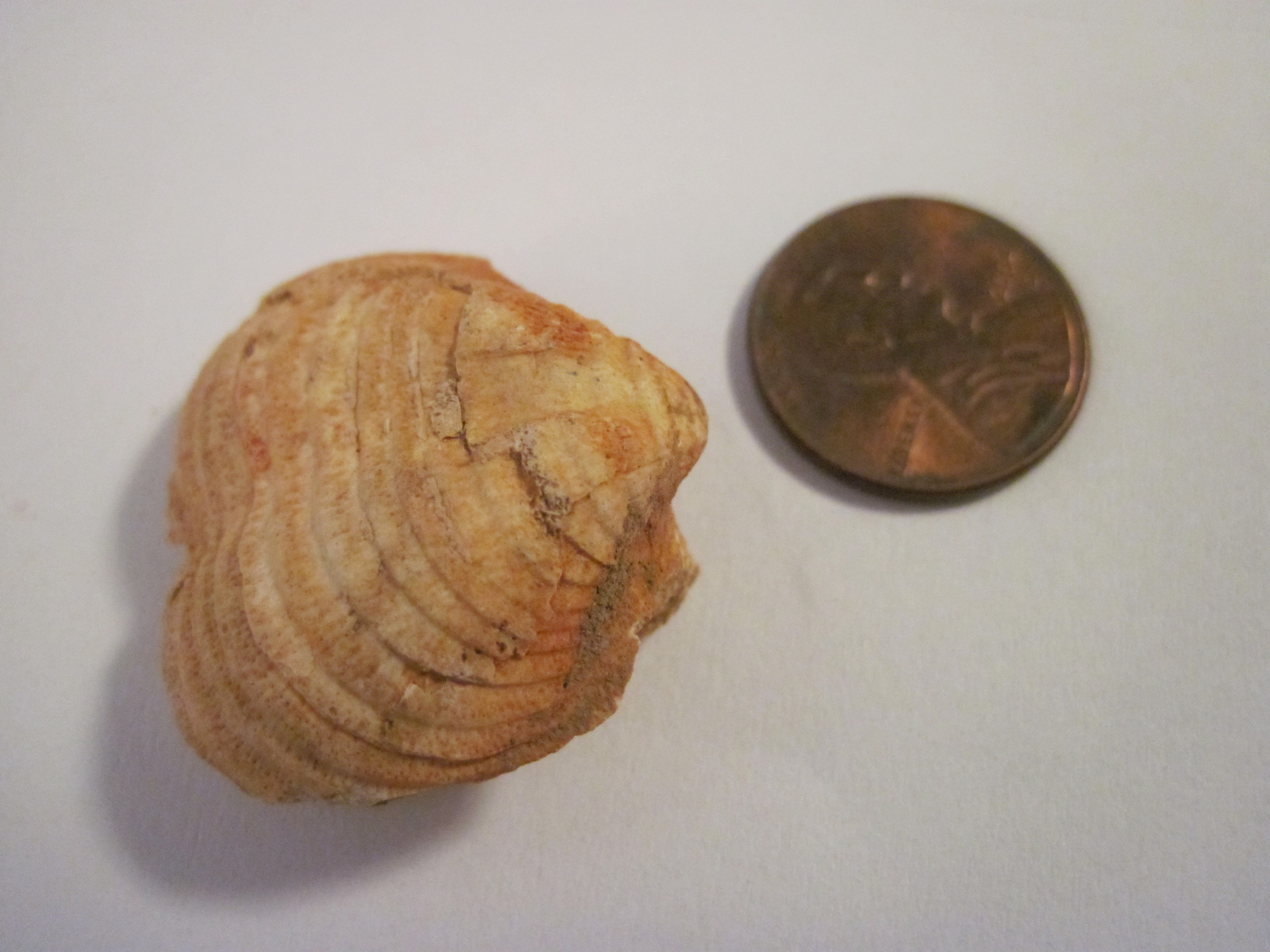
- Fossilized shell of the Late Devonian-Permian brachiopod Composita
  †Composita
  - †Composita grandis – or unidentified comparable form
  - †Composita subtilita – or unidentified comparable form
- †Conchidium
  - †Conchidium biloculare – or unidentified comparable form
- †Conocardium
- †Cordillerastraea
  - †Cordillerastraea inyoensis – type locality for species
- †Cornwallatia
  - †Cornwallatia tabularia
- †Corymbospongia
  - †Corymbospongia adnata
  - †Corymbospongia mica
  - †Corymbospongia perforata
- †Costispinifera – report made of unidentified related form or using admittedly obsolete nomenclature
  - †Costispinifera costata – tentative report
- †Crenulosepta
  - †Crenulosepta delicata – type locality for species
  - †Crenulosepta fusiformis – type locality for species
  - †Crenulosepta inyoensis – type locality for species
  - †Crenulosepta rossi – type locality for species
  - †Crenulosepta wahlmani – type locality for species
- †Crurithyris
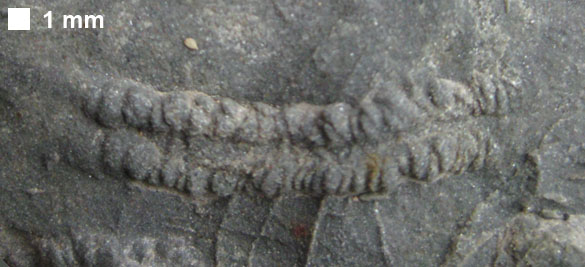
- Fossil of the Devonian-Triassic arthropod trackway ichnogenus Cruziana
  †Cruziana
- †Cuniculinella
  - †Cuniculinella acuta – type locality for species
  - †Cuniculinella ampla – type locality for species
  - †Cuniculinella calx
  - †Cuniculinella extensa – type locality for species
  - †Cuniculinella fusiformis – type locality for species
  - †Cuniculinella mojavensis – type locality for species
  - †Cuniculinella munda – type locality for species
  - †Cuniculinella parva – type locality for species
  - †Cuniculinella solita – type locality for species
  - †Cuniculinella tumida – type locality for species
  - †Cuniculinella ventricosa – type locality for species
- †Cyathactis
  - †Cyathactis gazellensis – type locality for species
- †Cybelurus
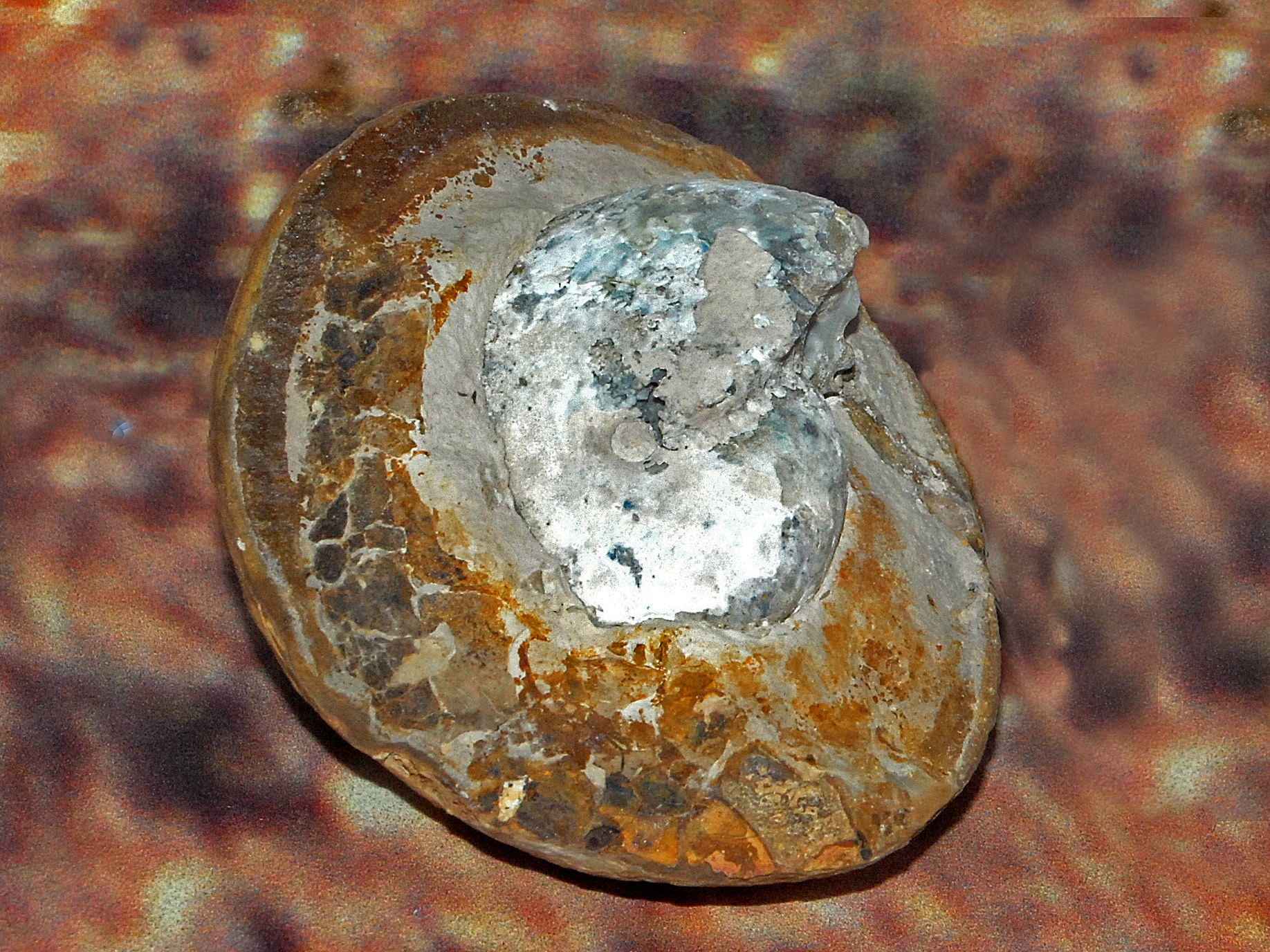
- Fossilized shell of the Permian ammonoid cephalopod Cyclolobus
  †Cyclolobus
  - †Cyclolobus walkeri
- †Cyclonema
  - †Cyclonema bilix – or unidentified comparable form
- †Cymbidium
- †Cyrtina
- †Cystiphyllum
- †Cystothalamiella
  - †Cystothalamiella craticula
  - †Cystothalamiella ducta
  - †Cystothalamiella tuboides

== D ==
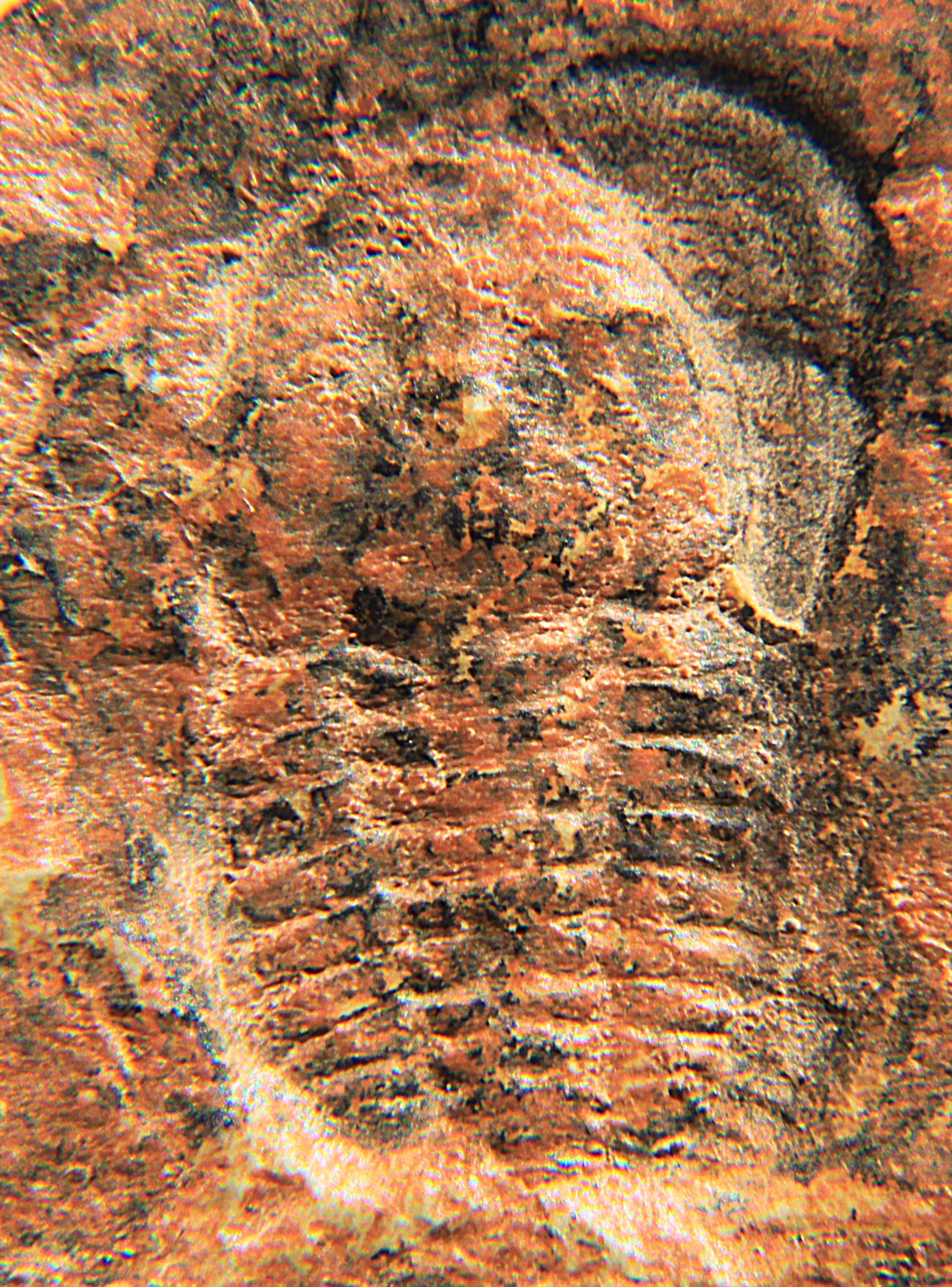
- Fossil of the Cambrian trilobite Daguinaspis
  †Daguinaspis
- †Dalejina
- †Dalmanella
- †Dalmanophyllum
  - †Dalmanophyllum dalmani – or unidentified comparable form
- †Darwasophyllum – tentative report
- †Deacheospira
  - †Deacheospira hotzi – type locality for species
- †Deltopecten – tentative report
- †Derbyia
- †Diacanthaspis
- †Dicellograptus
- †Dicoelosia
  - †Dicoelosia conspicua – or unidentified related form
  - †Dicoelosia jonesridgenesis
  - †Dicoelosia jonesridgensis
- †Dictyoclostus – report made of unidentified related form or using admittedly obsolete nomenclature
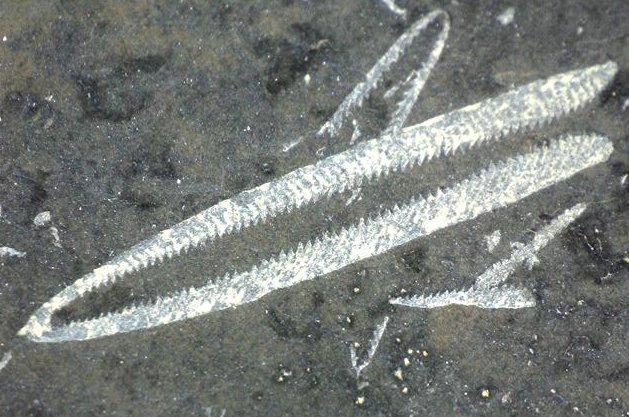
- Fossil of the Middle Ordovician graptolite Didymograptus
  †Didymograptus
  - †Didymograptus protobifidus
- †Dimeropygiella
  - †Dimeropygiella caudanodosa
- †Diochthofera
  - †Diochthofera conspicua
- †Diplanus
  - †Diplanus stanleyi
- †Diplichnites
- †Discomyorthis
- †Discotropis – tentative report
- †Dolerorthis
- †Donaldiella
  - †Donaldiella derwiduii – or unidentified comparable form
- †Dorsoscyphus
  - †Dorsoscyphus johnsoni
- †Durhamina
  - †Durhamina kenneyi – type locality for species
- †Dyticospirifer

== E ==
- †Eccyliopterus
  - †Eccyliopterus regularis – or unidentified related form
- †Echinauris
  - †Echinauris subhorrida
- †Echinoconchus
  - †Echinoconchus punctatus
- †Ectenonotus
  - †Ectenonotus raymondi – or unidentified comparable form
  - †Ectenonotus westoni – or unidentified comparable form
  - †Ectenonotus whittingtoni
- †Ectomaria
  - †Ectomaria callahanensis – type locality for species
  - †Ectomaria prisca
- †Elasmothyris
  - †Elasmothyris limata – type locality for species
- †Encrinurus
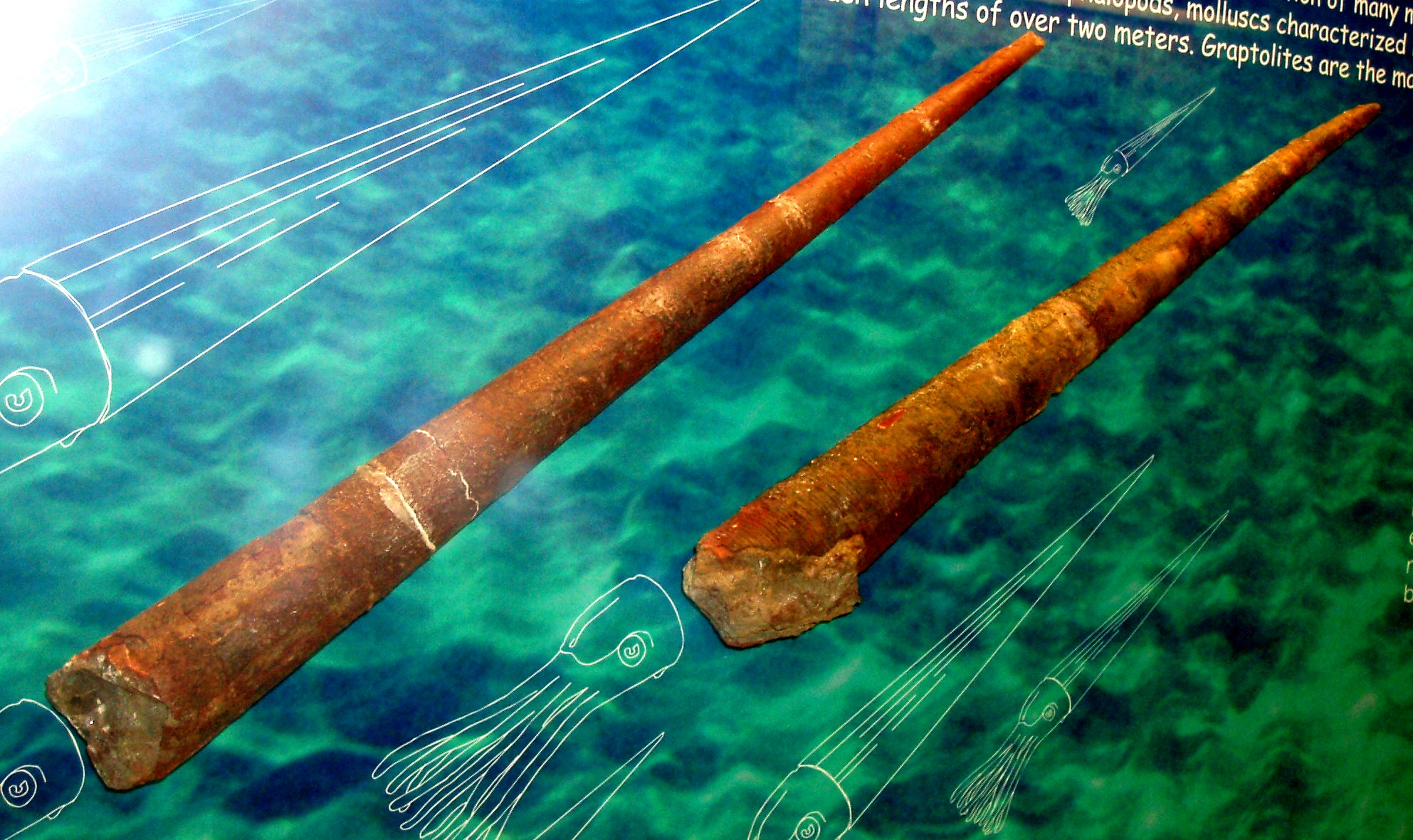
- Fossilized shells and restored appearances of the Middle-Late Ordovician nautiloid cephalopod Endoceras
  †Endoceras – tentative report
- †Enigmalites
  - †Enigmalites roberti – type locality for species
- †Eofletcheria
- †Eomarginifera
- †Eoparafusulina
  - †Eoparafusulina alta – type locality for species
  - †Eoparafusulina brevis – type locality for species
  - †Eoparafusulina certa – type locality for species
  - †Eoparafusulina contracta – type locality for species
  - †Eoparafusulina cylindrica – type locality for species
  - †Eoparafusulina depressa – type locality for species
  - †Eoparafusulina gracilis
  - †Eoparafusulina linearis
  - †Eoparafusulina minuta – type locality for species
  - †Eoparafusulina modica – type locality for species
  - †Eoparafusulina nitida – type locality for species
  - †Eoparafusulina ovata – type locality for species
  - †Eoparafusulina parva – type locality for species
  - †Eoparafusulina potterensis – type locality for species
  - †Eoparafusulina proba – type locality for species
  - †Eoparafusulina regularis – type locality for species
  - †Eoparafusulina rotunda – type locality for species
  - †Eoparafusulina spissa – type locality for species
  - †Eoparafusulina tarda – type locality for species
  - †Eoparafusulina tenuitheca – type locality for species
  - †Eoparafusulina thompsoni
- †Eotomaria
  - †Eotomaria perryi – type locality for species
- †Epitomyonia
  - †Epitomyonia recilina
  - †Epitomyonia relicina
- †Eridmatus
  - †Eridmatus texanus – or unidentified comparable form
- †Eridorthis
- †Eripnifera – type locality for genus
  - †Eripnifera praecipitis – type locality for species
- †Etheripecten
- †Euconospira
- †Eunema
  - †Eunema strigillatum – or unidentified comparable form
- †Euomphalopterus – tentative report
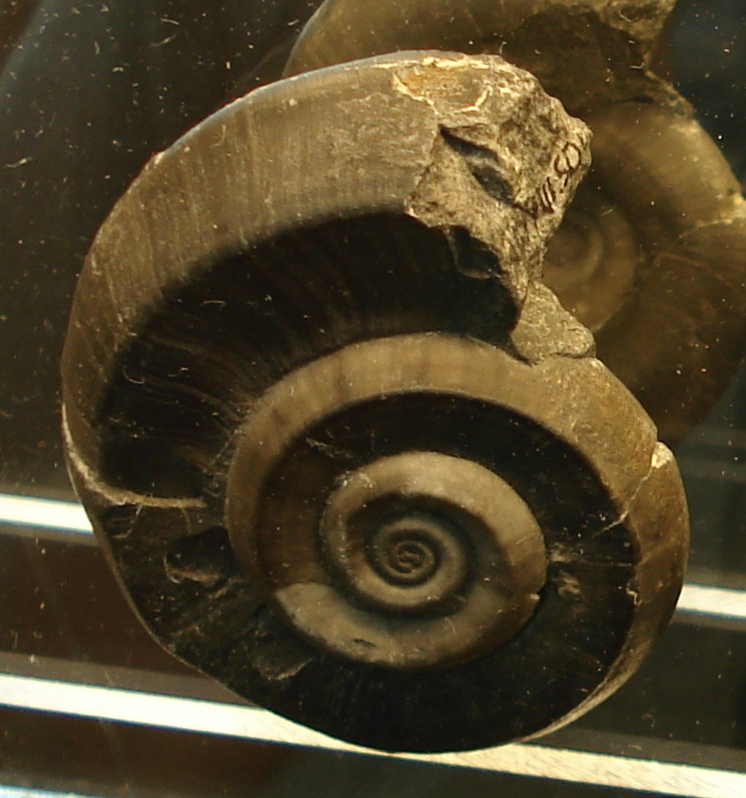
- Fossilized shell of the Silurian-Permian sea snail Euomphalus
  †Euomphalus
- †Eurogrewingkia
  - †Eurogrewingkia penobscotensis
- †Eusphairica – type locality for genus
  - †Eusphairica distubula – type locality for species

== F ==
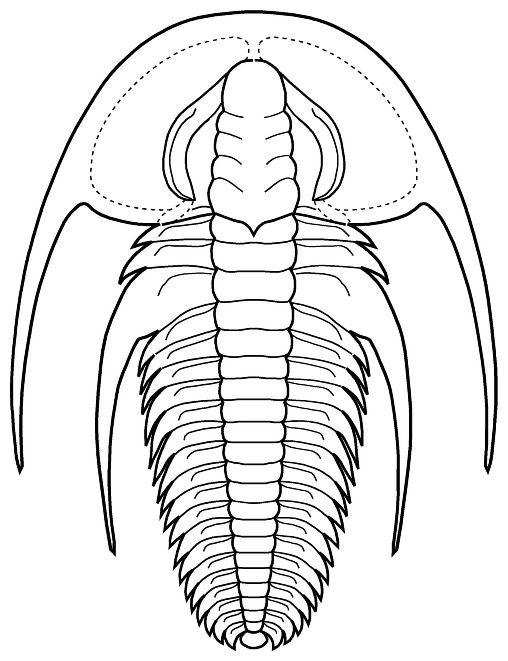
- Illustration of a fossil of the Cambrian trilobite Fallotaspis
  †Fallotaspis
- †Favosites
- †Fenestella
- †Fieldaspis
- †Fluctuaria
- †Fomichevella
  - †Fomichevella major – or unidentified comparable form
  - †Fomichevella nevadensis

== G ==
- †Gallatinospongia
  - †Gallatinospongia conica
- †Girtyocoelia
  - †Girtyocoelia epiporata
  - †Girtyocoelia tubula
- †Glassia – tentative report
- †Globonema
  - †Globonema niota – or unidentified comparable form
- †Glossopleura
  - †Glossopleura lodensis
  - †Glossopleura walcotti
- †Glyptorthis
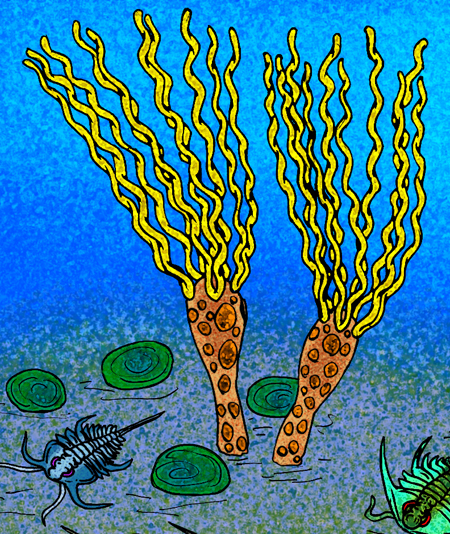
- Life restoration of the Cambrian echinoderm Gogia
  †Gogia
  - †Gogia ojenai – type locality for species
- †Goniostropha
  - †Goniostropha bachelieri – or unidentified comparable form
- †Gshelia
  - †Gshelia americana – type locality for species
- †Gypidula

== H ==
- †Halysites
- †Heintzella
  - †Heintzella applegatei – type locality for species
  - †Heintzella playfordi
- †Helicoplacus
  - †Helicoplacus gilberti
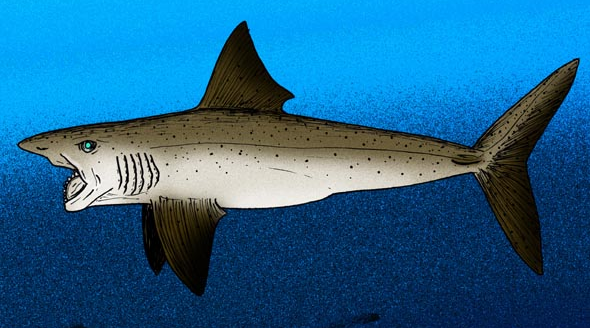
- Life restoration of the Permian Chimaera relative Helicoprion
  †Helicoprion
  - †Helicoprion davisii
- †Helicotoma
  - †Helicotoma griffinorum – type locality for species
- †Heliolites
- †Heliomeroides
- †Hercynella
  - †Hercynella bohemica – or unidentified comparable form
- †Heritschiella
  - †Heritschiella girtyi
- †Heritschioides
  - †Heritschioides carneyi – type locality for species
  - †Heritschioides hammani – type locality for species
  - †Heritschioides wexoi – type locality for species
- †Hesperocoelia
  - †Hesperocoelia undulata
- †Hesperorthis
  - †Hesperorthis dubia – or unidentified comparable form
  - †Hesperorthis evenkiensis
- †Heterocaninia
  - †Heterocaninia langenheimi – type locality for species
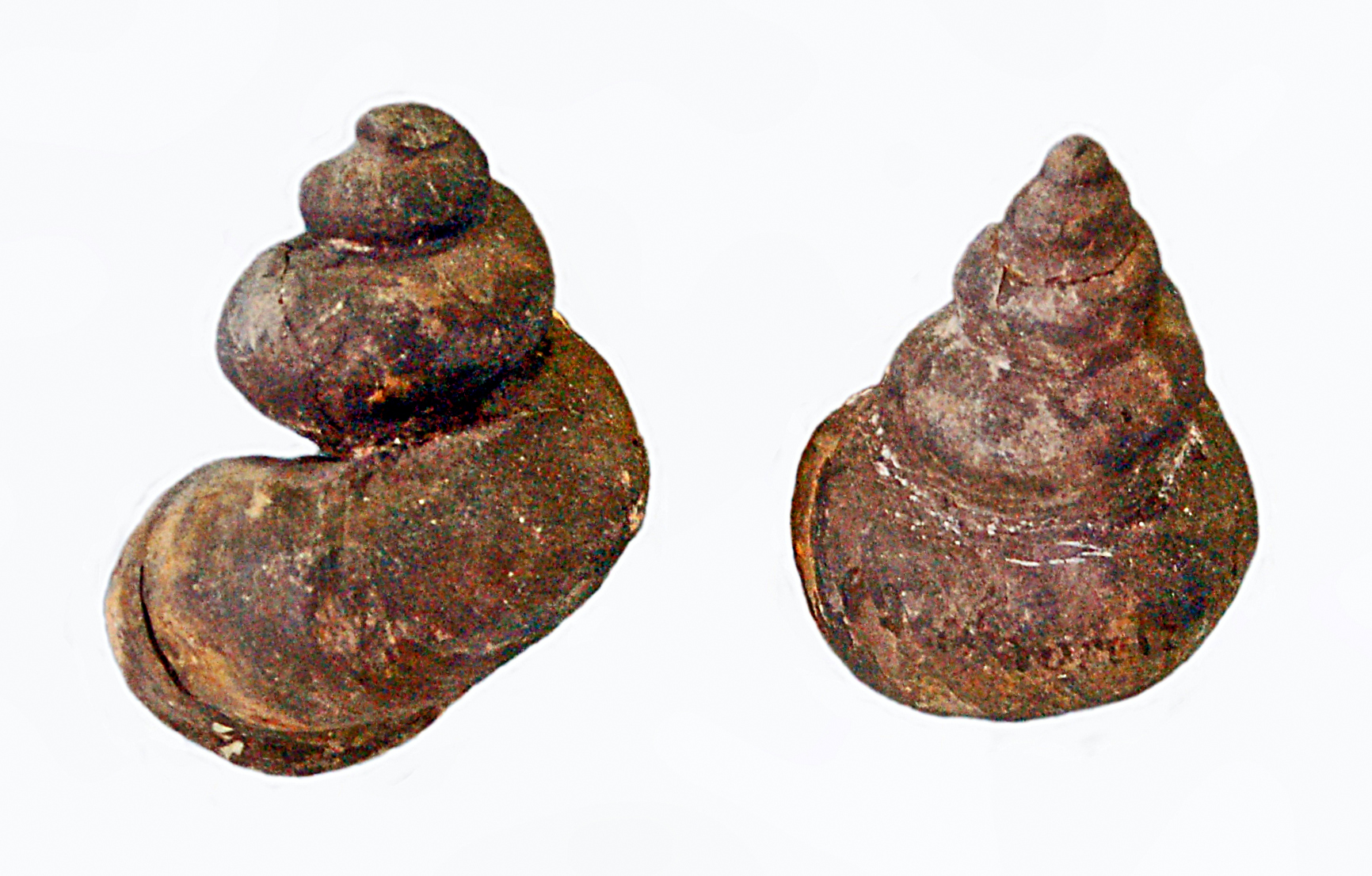
- Fossilized shells of the Ordovician-Carboniferous sea snail Holopea
  †Holopea
  - †Holopea brucei – type locality for species
  - †Holopea elizabethi – type locality for species
  - †Holopea glindmeyeri – type locality for species
  - †Holopea symmetrica – or unidentified comparable form
- †Hormotoma
- †Howellella
  - †Howellella smithi – or unidentified comparable form
- †Hustedia
  - †Hustedia compressa
- †Hyalostelia
- †Hyolithes
- †Hystricurus

== I ==
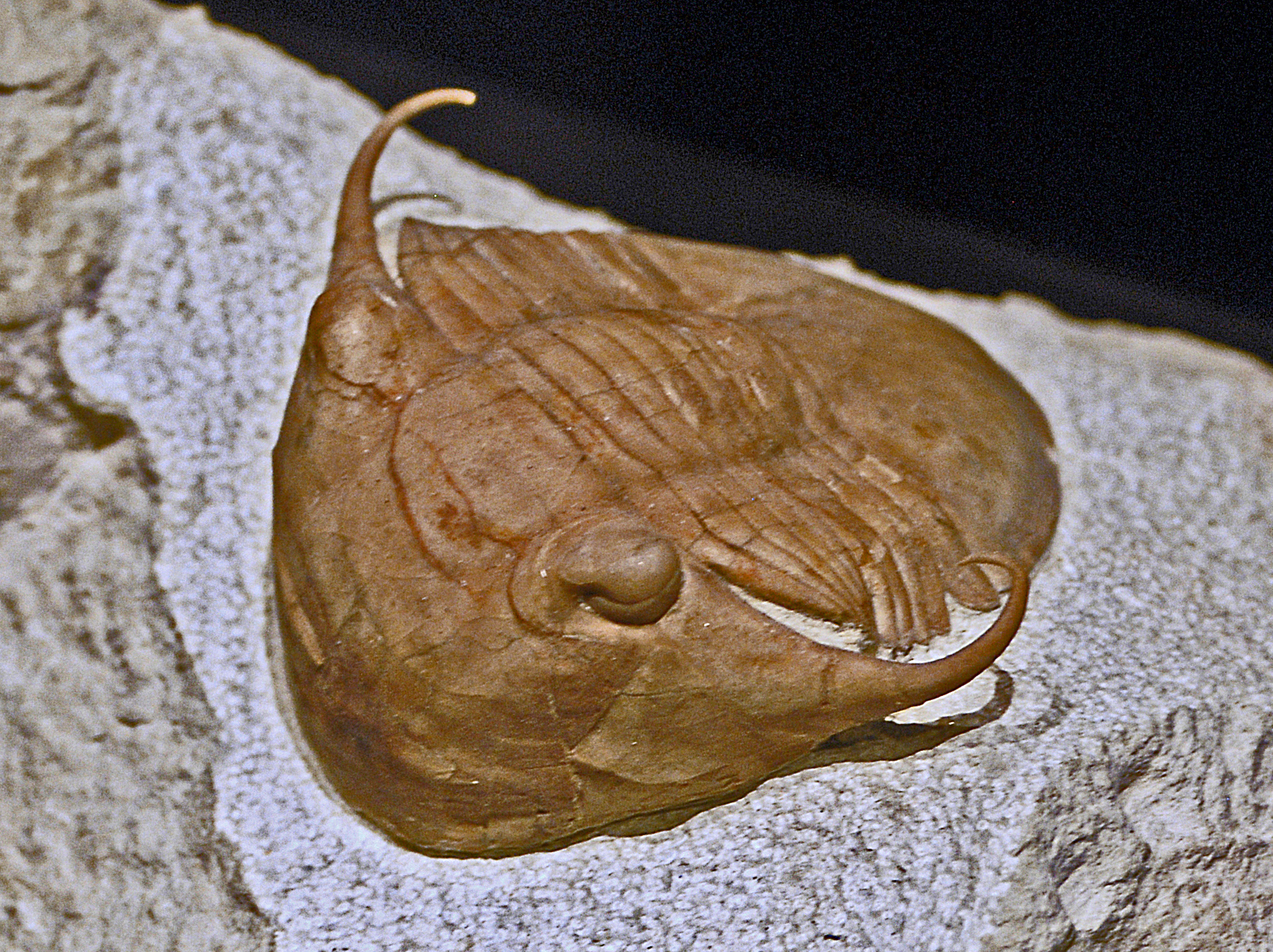
- Fossil of the Middle Ordovician trilobite Illaenus
  †Illaenus
- †Imperatoria
  - †Imperatoria irregularis
  - †Imperatoria media
  - †Imperatoria mega
  - †Imperatoria minima
- †Ingria
- †Inyoschwagerina
  - †Inyoschwagerina elayeri – type locality for species
  - †Inyoschwagerina elongata – type locality for species
  - †Inyoschwagerina inflata – type locality for species
  - †Inyoschwagerina linderae – type locality for species
  - †Inyoschwagerina magnifica – type locality for species
  - †Inyoschwagerina mira – type locality for species
  - †Inyoschwagerina rotunda – type locality for species
  - †Inyoschwagerina turgida
- †Ischyrotoma
- †Iskutella
  - †Iskutella fergusoni – type locality for species
- †Isogramma
  - †Isogramma pachti
- †Isorthis – tentative report
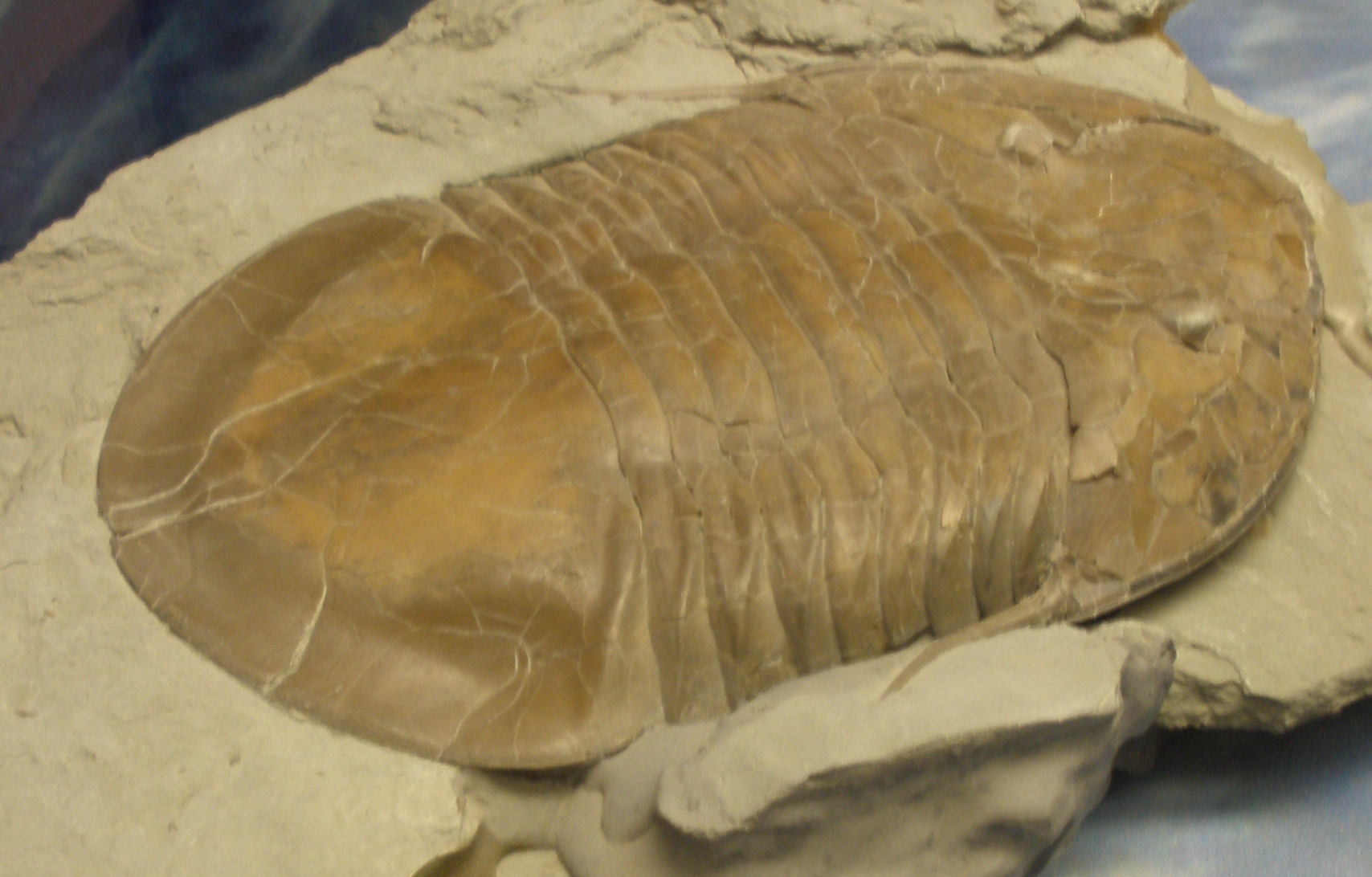
- Fossil of the Middle-Late Ordovician giant trilobite Isotelus.
  †Isotelus
  - †Isotelus spurius

== K ==
- †Kabyaipecten
- †Karavankina
- †Kawina
  - †Kawina scrobiculus
- †Kirkirhynchus
  - †Kirkirhynchus reesidei – or unidentified comparable form
- †Kitakamithyris
- †Klamathastraea – type locality for genus
  - †Klamathastraea dilleri – type locality for species
- †Klamathina
  - †Klamathina elongata – type locality for species
  - †Klamathina simplex – type locality for species
  - †Klamathina singularis – type locality for species
- †Kleopatrina – type locality for genus
  - †Kleopatrina mccloudensis – type locality for species
  - †Kleopatrina raubae – type locality for species
- †Komiella
  - †Komiella ostiolata – or unidentified comparable form
- †Krotovia
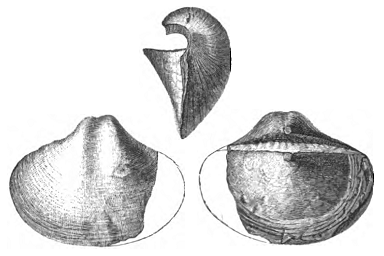
- Illustration of a fossilized shell of the brachiopod Kutorgina
  †Kutorgina
- †Kyphophyllum
  - †Kyphophyllum greggi – type locality for species

== L ==
- †Langenheimia – type locality for genus
  - †Langenheimia klamathensis – type locality for species
- †Laticrura
  - †Laticrura erecta – or unidentified related form
- †Leioclema – tentative report
- †Leperditia
  - †Leperditia bivia
- †Leptellina
- †Leptodus
  - †Leptodus nobilis – or unidentified related form
- †Leptostrophia – tentative report
- †Leptotriticites
  - †Leptotriticites americanus – or unidentified related form
  - †Leptotriticites californicus
  - †Leptotriticites glenensis
  - †Leptotriticites gracilitatus – or unidentified comparable form
  - †Leptotriticites hatchetensis – or unidentified related form
  - †Leptotriticites hughesensis – or unidentified comparable form
  - †Leptotriticites koschmanni – or unidentified comparable form
  - †Leptotriticites panamintensis – type locality for species
  - †Leptotriticites varius – or unidentified comparable form
  - †Leptotriticites warmspringensis – type locality for species
  - †Leptotriticites wetherensis
- †Lingula
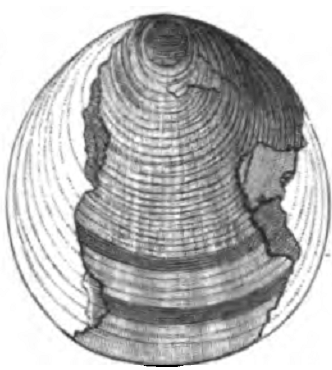
- Illustration of a fossilized shell of the Cambrian-Late Ordovician brachiopod Lingulella
  †Lingulella
- †Linoproductus
  - †Linoproductus nasutus – tentative report
- †Linsleyella – type locality for genus
  - †Linsleyella greggi – type locality for species
  - †Linsleyella johnsoni – type locality for species
- †Liosotella
  - †Liosotella cooperi – type locality for species
- †Liospira
  - †Liospira modesta
- †Lissocoelia
  - †Lissocoelia ramosa
- †Lissomarginifera
  - †Lissomarginifera shastensis
- †Lithostrotion
  - †Lithostrotion pauciradiale
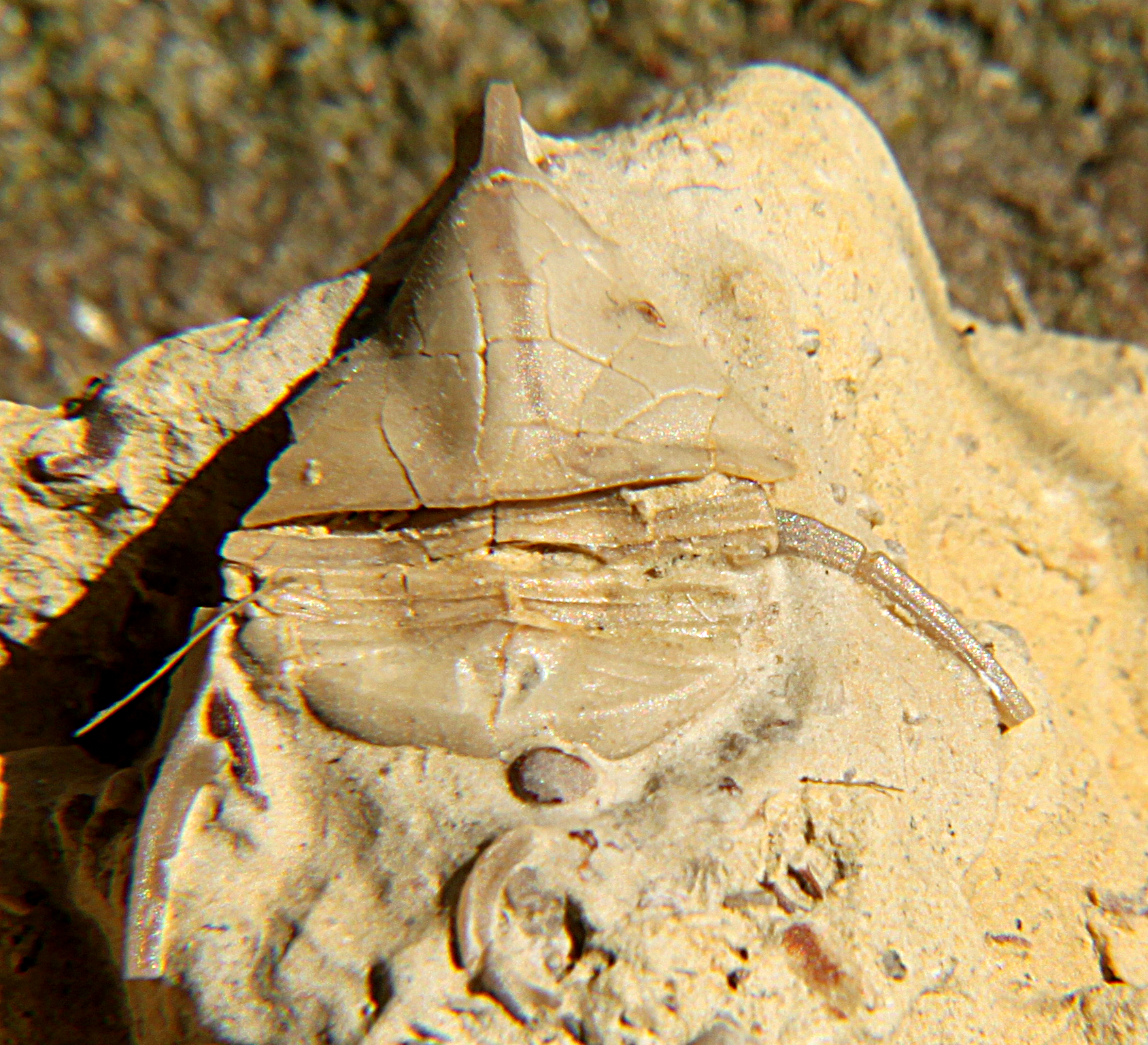
- Fossil of the Ordovician trilobite Lonchodomas
  †Lonchodomas
- †Lophospira
  - †Lophospira milleri – or unidentified comparable form
  - †Lophospira perangulata
- †Loxonema – tentative report
- †Lytvophyllum – tentative report

== M ==
- †Maclurites
  - †Maclurites crassa – or unidentified related form
  - †Maclurites klamathensis – type locality for species
- †Malpaisia – type locality for genus
  - †Malpaisia maceyi – type locality for species
- †Meekella
- †Megakozlowskiella
- †Megalomphala – tentative report
  - †Megalomphala contorta
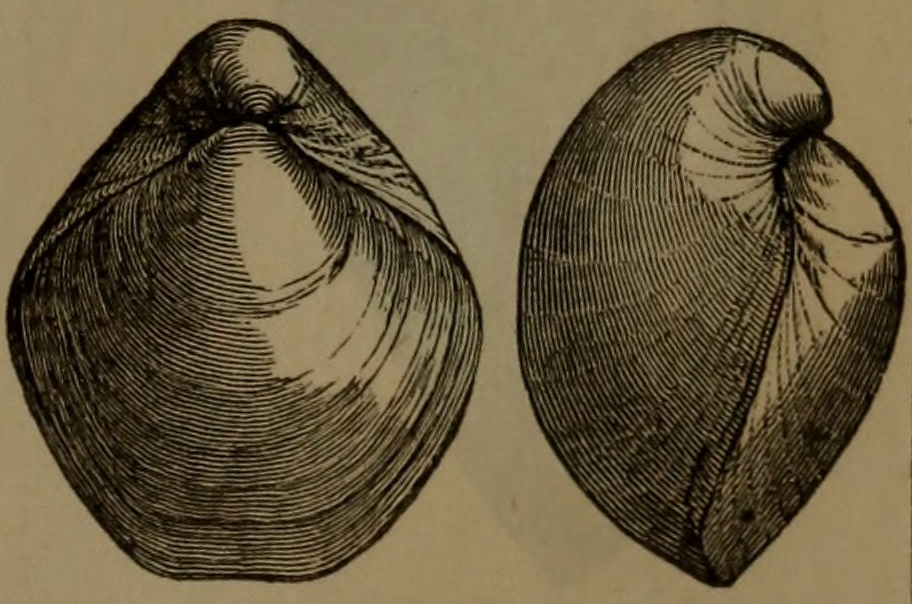
- Illustration (lower right, entry 15) of a fossilized shell in front and side views of the Silurian-Late Devonian brachiopod Meristella
  †Meristella
  - †Meristella robertsensis – or unidentified comparable form
- †Mesocoelia
  - †Mesocoelia janus – or unidentified comparable form
- †Mesodouvillina – tentative report
- †Mestoronema
  - †Mestoronema marginalis – or unidentified comparable form
- †Mexicaspis
  - †Mexicaspis radiatus
- †Mexicella
  - †Mexicella grandoculus
  - †Mexicella mexicana
  - †Mexicella robusta
  - †Mexicella stator – tentative report
- †Michelinia
  - †Michelinia nelsoni – type locality for species
- †Micromitra
- †Microryctocara
  - †Microryctocara nevadensis
- †Monocraterion
- †Monodiexodina – tentative report
- †Mooreoceras
- †Mucophyllum
  - †Mucophyllum mcintyrei – or unidentified comparable form
- †Murchisonia
  - †Murchisonia bilineata – or unidentified comparable form

== N ==
- †Neilsonia
- †Neochonetes
  - †Neochonetes pseudoliratus – or unidentified related form
- †Neomultithecopora
  - †Neomultithecopora mccutcheonae
  - †Neomultithecopora providensis – type locality for species
  - †Neomultithecopora sandoi – type locality for species
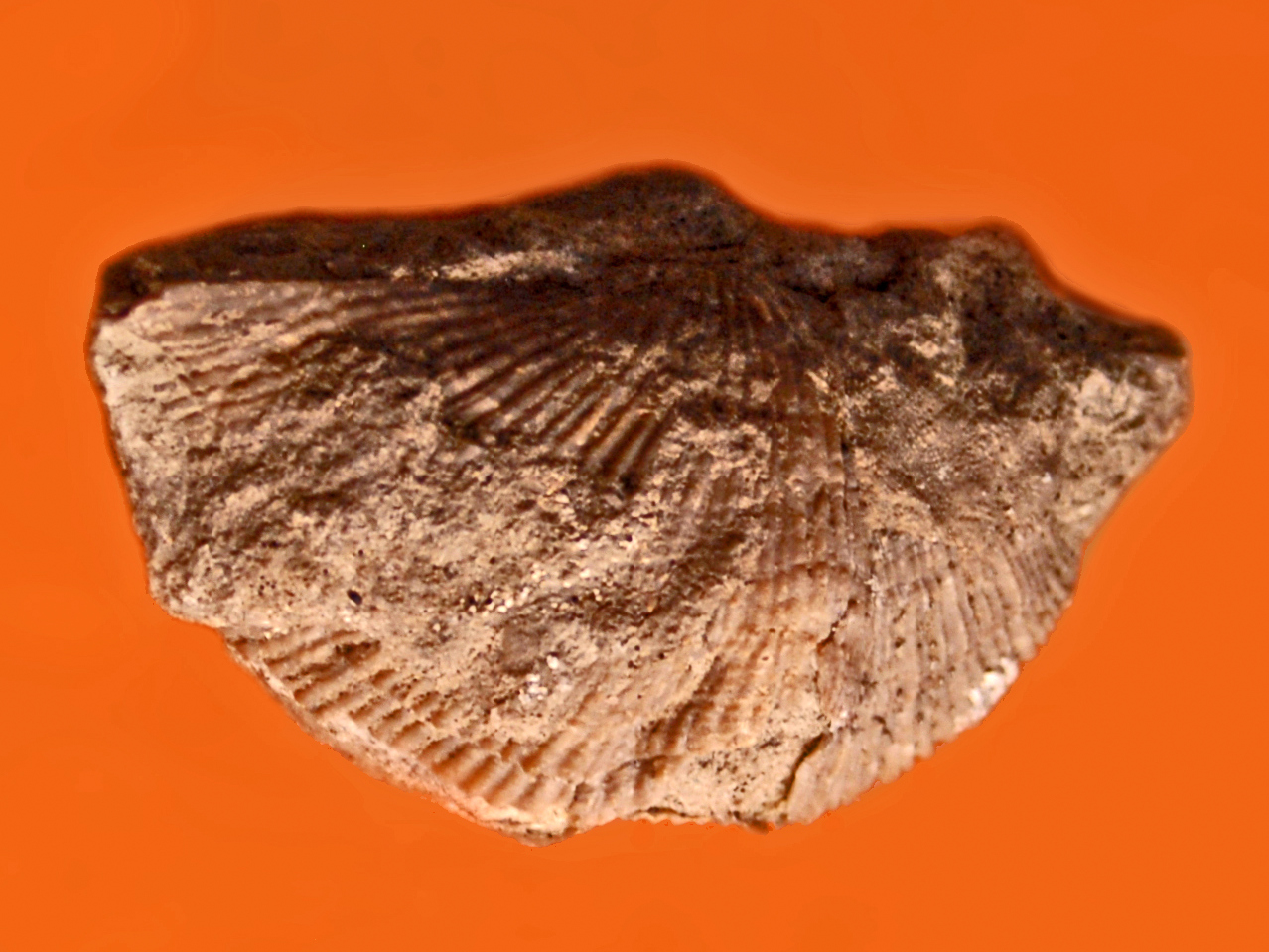
- Fossilized shell of the Carboniferous-Permian brachiopod Neospirifer
  †Neospirifer
- †Neosyringopora
  - †Neosyringopora multattenuata
- †Nephrolenellus
  - †Nephrolenellus multinodus
- †Nevadatubuls
  - †Nevadatubuls dunfee
- †Nevadatubulus
  - †Nevadatubulus dunfee
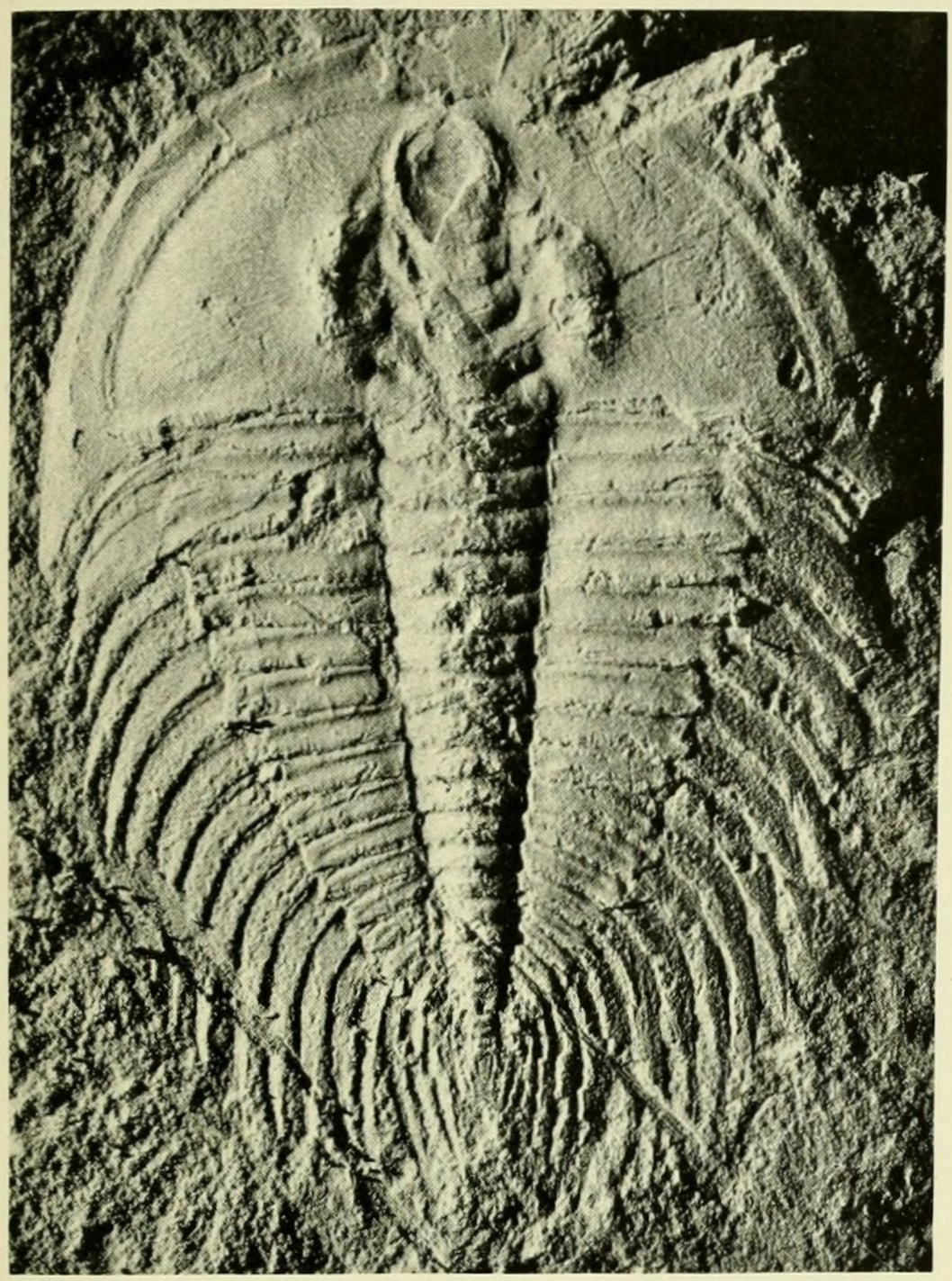
- Fossil of the Cambrian trilobite Nevadella
  †Nevadella
- †Nigribaccinus
  - †Nigribaccinus elegans – type locality for species
  - †Nigribaccinus giganteus – type locality for species
  - †Nigribaccinus nestelli – type locality for species
- †Nileus
  - †Nileus hesperaffinis
- †Nucleospira
  - †Nucleospira ventricosa – or unidentified comparable form
- †Nuculavus
- †Nuculites
- †Nyella
  - †Nyella clinolimbata – tentative report

== O ==
- †Obolella
- †OIenellus
  - †OIenellus gilberti
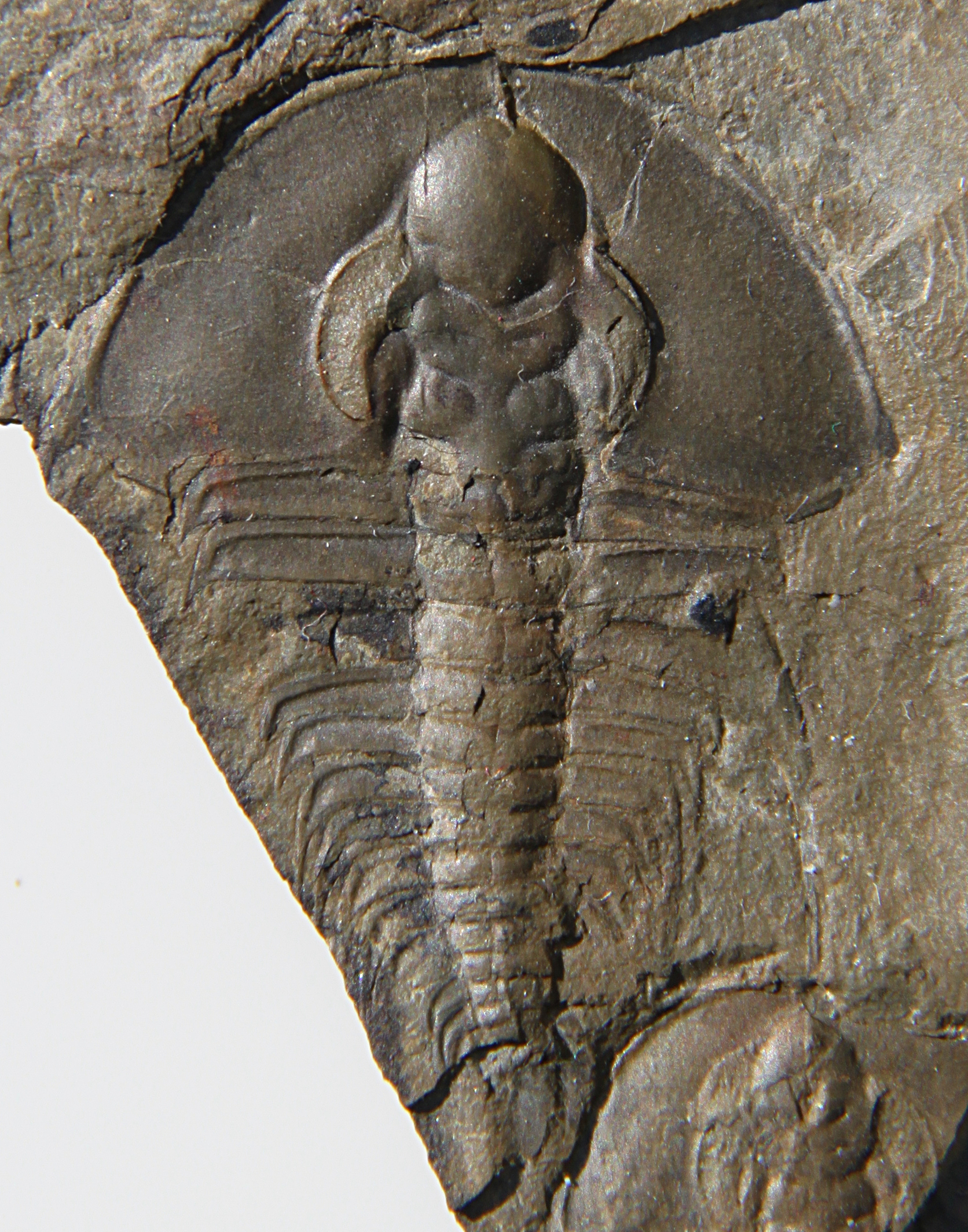
- Illustration of a fossil of the Cambrian trilobite Olenellus
  †Olenellus
  - †Olenellus arcuatus
  - †Olenellus clarki
  - †Olenellus cylindricus
  - †Olenellus euryparia
  - †Olenellus fowleri – or unidentified comparable form
  - †Olenellus frementi
  - †Olenellus fremonti
  - †Olenellus gilberti
  - †Olenellus howelli
  - †Olenellus multinodus
  - †Olenellus nevadensis
  - †Olenellus puertoblancoensis
  - †Olenellus terminatus
  - †Olenellus transifans – or unidentified comparable form
  - †Olenellus transiftans – or unidentified comparable form
  - †Olenellus transitans – or unidentified comparable form
  - †Olenellus turmalis – or unidentified comparable form
- †Omphalotrochus
  - †Omphalotrochus whitneyi – type locality for species
- †Onchocephalites
  - †Onchocephalites claytonensis – type locality for species
  - †Onchocephalites laevis
- †Ophiletina
  - †Ophiletina sublaxa – or unidentified related form
- †Orbiculoidea
  - †Orbiculoidea damanensis
- †Orthambonites
  - †Orthambonites decipiens
  - †Orthambonites eucharis
  - †Orthambonites mazousbensis
  - †Orthambonites minisculus
  - †Orthambonites minusculus
  - †Orthambonites patulus
- †Orthidiella
  - †Orthidiella extensa
- †Orthophyllum – tentative report
- †Orthotetes
- †Orthotichia
  - †Orthotichia nawtawaketensis
- †Oryctocephalites
  - †Oryctocephalites resseri
- †Oryctocephalus
  - †Oryctocephalus indicus
  - †Oryctocephalus nyensis
  - †Oryctocephalus orientalis
- †Ovatia

== P ==
- †Pachystrophia – tentative report
  - †Pachystrophia devexa – or unidentified comparable form
- †Pacificocoelia
- †Paladin
- Palaeoaplysina
- †Palaeomphalus
  - †Palaeomphalus olsoni – type locality for species
- †Palaeophycus
- †Palaeophyllum
- †Paleochiton
  - †Paleochiton siskiyouensis – type locality for species
- †Palliseria
- †Paraantagmus
  - †Paraantagmus latus
- †Parafusulina
  - †Parafusulina bakeri – or unidentified comparable form
  - †Parafusulina californica
  - †Parafusulina cerrogordoensis – type locality for species
  - †Parafusulina complexa – type locality for species
  - †Parafusulina durhami – or unidentified related form
  - †Parafusulina halli – type locality for species
  - †Parafusulina juncea – type locality for species
  - †Parafusulina klamathensis – type locality for species
  - †Parafusulina maleyi
  - †Parafusulina mccloudensis – type locality for species
  - †Parafusulina nosonensis
  - †Parafusulina owensensis – type locality for species
  - †Parafusulina potterensis – type locality for species
  - †Parafusulina shaksgamensis – or unidentified comparable form
  - †Parafusulina splendens
  - †Parafusulina ubehebensis – type locality for species
  - †Parafusulina virga
- †Paraheritschioides
  - †Paraheritschioides californiense – or unidentified related form
  - †Paraheritschioides stevensi – type locality for species
- †Paralbertella
- †Paralenorthis
  - †Paralenorthis marshalli
  - †Paralenorthis parcicrassicostatus – or unidentified comparable form
  - †Paralenorthis parvicrassicostata – or unidentified comparable form
  - †Paralenorthis parvicrassicostatus – or unidentified comparable form
- †Paraliospira – type locality for genus
  - †Paraliospira angulata
  - †Paraliospira gradata – type locality for species
  - †Paraliospira helena
  - †Paraliospira mundula
  - †Paraliospira planata – type locality for species
- †Parallelodon
  - †Parallelodon cingulatus
  - †Parallelodon qinghaiensis
  - †Parallelodon verneuilianus
- †Paramesolobus – tentative report
  - †Paramesolobus sinuosus – or unidentified comparable form
- †Pararachnastraea
  - †Pararachnastraea bellula – type locality for species
  - †Pararachnastraea delicata – type locality for species
  - †Pararachnastraea mckibbinae – type locality for species
  - †Pararachnastraea owensensis – type locality for species
  - †Pararachnastraea peggyae – type locality for species
  - †Pararachnastraea wilsoni – type locality for species
- †Paraschwagerina
  - †Paraschwagerina crassitheca – type locality for species
  - †Paraschwagerina elongata – type locality for species
  - †Paraschwagerina fairbanksi – type locality for species
  - †Paraschwagerina fax
  - †Paraschwagerina magna – type locality for species
  - †Paraschwagerina tarda – type locality for species
- †Patellispongia
  - †Patellispongia oculata – or unidentified comparable form
- †Patriaspirifer
  - †Patriaspirifer kobehana
- †Paupospira
  - †Paupospira sumnerensis – or unidentified related form
- †Paurorthis
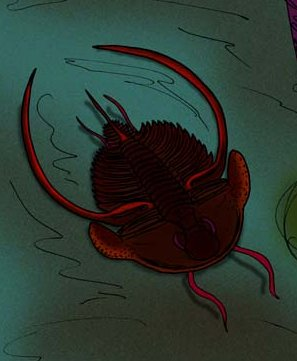
- Life restoration of the Cambrian trilobite Peachella
  †Peachella
  - †Peachella brevispina
  - †Peachella iddingsi
- †Peniculauris – report made of unidentified related form or using admittedly obsolete nomenclature
  - †Peniculauris bassi
- †Pentamerus
- †Perditocardinia
- †Permophorus
- †Pernopecten
- †Perrinites
  - †Perrinites hilli
- †Peruniscus
- †Petalaxis
  - †Petalaxis allisonae – type locality for species
  - †Petalaxis besti – type locality for species
  - †Petalaxis exiguus – type locality for species
  - †Petalaxis occidentalis
  - †Petalaxis sutherlandi – type locality for species
- †Petrozium
  - †Petrozium staufferi – type locality for species
- †Phillipsia
  - †Phillipsia nosonensis – type locality for species
- †Pholidops
- †Phragmorthis
  - †Phragmorthis buttsi – or unidentified comparable form
- †Phricodothyris
- †Phyllograptus
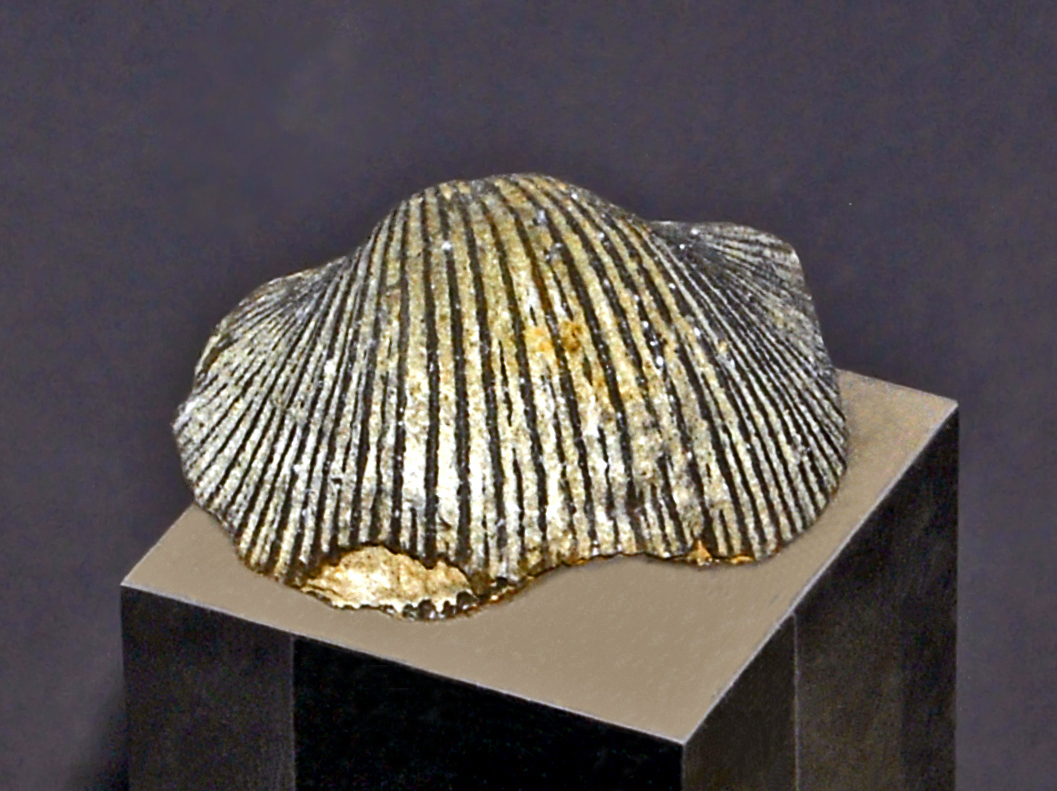
- Fossilized shell of the Ordovician brachiopod Plaesiomys
  †Plaesiomys
- †Plagiura
  - †Plagiura cerops – or unidentified comparable form
  - †Plagiura minor
- †Planolites
- †Plasmopora
  - †Plasmopora follis – or unidentified comparable form
- †Platyceras
- †Plectatrypa
- †Plectorthis
  - †Plectorthis mazourkaensis
  - †Plectorthis patula
- †Poleumita
  - †Poleumita octavia
- †Polidevcia
- †Polyplacus
  - †Polyplacus kilmeri
- †Polypora
- †Porefieldia
  - †Porefieldia robusta
- †Presbynileus
- †Productus
  - †Productus keokuk
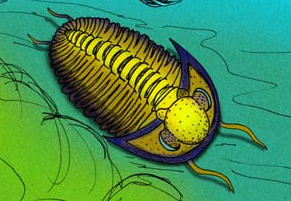
- Restoration of the Silurian trilobite Proetus
  †Proetus
- †Proexenocrinus
  - †Proexenocrinus inyoensis
- †Progalerus – tentative report
- †Prosolarium
- †Protocalymene
  - †Protocalymene mcallisteri
- †Protowentzelella – type locality for genus
  - †Protowentzelella cystosa
  - †Protowentzelella kunthi
  - †Protowentzelella noinskyi
  - †Protowentzelella shastensis – type locality for species
  - †Protowentzelella variabilis – type locality for species
- †Proturritella
  - †Proturritella historicum – or unidentified related form
- †Pseudocheirurus
- †Pseudochusenella
  - †Pseudochusenella buttensis – type locality for species
  - †Pseudochusenella concisa
  - †Pseudochusenella hazzardi – type locality for species
- †Pseudocystophora
  - †Pseudocystophora fryi – type locality for species
  - †Pseudocystophora wilsoni – type locality for species
- †Pseudofusulina
  - †Pseudofusulina accepta – type locality for species
  - †Pseudofusulina acuta – type locality for species
  - †Pseudofusulina amoena – type locality for species
  - †Pseudofusulina ardua – type locality for species
  - †Pseudofusulina attenuata – type locality for species
  - †Pseudofusulina concisa – type locality for species
  - †Pseudofusulina contracta – type locality for species
  - †Pseudofusulina decora – type locality for species
  - †Pseudofusulina distorta – type locality for species
  - †Pseudofusulina elleryensis – type locality for species
  - †Pseudofusulina eximia – type locality for species
  - †Pseudofusulina extensa – type locality for species
  - †Pseudofusulina juncea – type locality for species
  - †Pseudofusulina laxa – type locality for species
  - †Pseudofusulina meeki – type locality for species
  - †Pseudofusulina minuta – type locality for species
  - †Pseudofusulina modesta – type locality for species
  - †Pseudofusulina monstrosa – type locality for species
  - †Pseudofusulina plana – type locality for species
  - †Pseudofusulina retusa – type locality for species
  - †Pseudofusulina solita – type locality for species
  - †Pseudofusulina soluta – type locality for species
  - †Pseudofusulina spissa – type locality for species
  - †Pseudofusulina tenuis – type locality for species
  - †Pseudofusulina tenuitheca – type locality for species
- †Pseudofusulinella
  - †Pseudofusulinella aculeata – type locality for species
  - †Pseudofusulinella acuminata – type locality for species
  - †Pseudofusulinella acuta – type locality for species
  - †Pseudofusulinella alta – type locality for species
  - †Pseudofusulinella antiqua – type locality for species
  - †Pseudofusulinella bellula – type locality for species
  - †Pseudofusulinella biconica – type locality for species
  - †Pseudofusulinella decora – type locality for species
  - †Pseudofusulinella delicata – type locality for species
  - †Pseudofusulinella dunbari – type locality for species
  - †Pseudofusulinella formosa – type locality for species
  - †Pseudofusulinella fragilis – type locality for species
  - †Pseudofusulinella fusiformis – type locality for species
  - †Pseudofusulinella harbaughi – type locality for species
  - †Pseudofusulinella meeki – type locality for species
  - †Pseudofusulinella montis
  - †Pseudofusulinella moorei – type locality for species
  - †Pseudofusulinella munda – type locality for species
  - †Pseudofusulinella nitida – type locality for species
  - †Pseudofusulinella obtusa – type locality for species
  - †Pseudofusulinella occidentalis
  - †Pseudofusulinella opima – type locality for species
  - †Pseudofusulinella parvula – type locality for species
  - †Pseudofusulinella pinguis – type locality for species
  - †Pseudofusulinella prima – type locality for species
  - †Pseudofusulinella proba – type locality for species
  - †Pseudofusulinella pulchella – type locality for species
  - †Pseudofusulinella retusa – type locality for species
  - †Pseudofusulinella rotunda – type locality for species
  - †Pseudofusulinella sera – type locality for species
  - †Pseudofusulinella simplex – type locality for species
  - †Pseudofusulinella solida – type locality for species
  - †Pseudofusulinella solita – type locality for species
  - †Pseudofusulinella spicata – type locality for species
  - †Pseudofusulinella splendens – type locality for species
  - †Pseudofusulinella thompsoni – type locality for species
  - †Pseudofusulinella tumida – type locality for species
  - †Pseudofusulinella ventricosa – type locality for species
  - †Pseudofusulinella venusta – type locality for species
  - †Pseudofusulinella wheeleri – type locality for species
- †Pseudomera
  - †Pseudomera barrandei – or unidentified comparable form
- †Pseudoschwagerina
  - †Pseudoschwagerina arta
  - †Pseudoschwagerina californica – type locality for species
  - †Pseudoschwagerina gerontica – or unidentified comparable form
  - †Pseudoschwagerina robusta
  - †Pseudoschwagerina roeseleri
  - †Pseudoschwagerina uddeni
- †Ptarmiganoides
  - †Ptarmiganoides hexacantha
  - †Ptarmiganoides propiqua – or unidentified comparable form
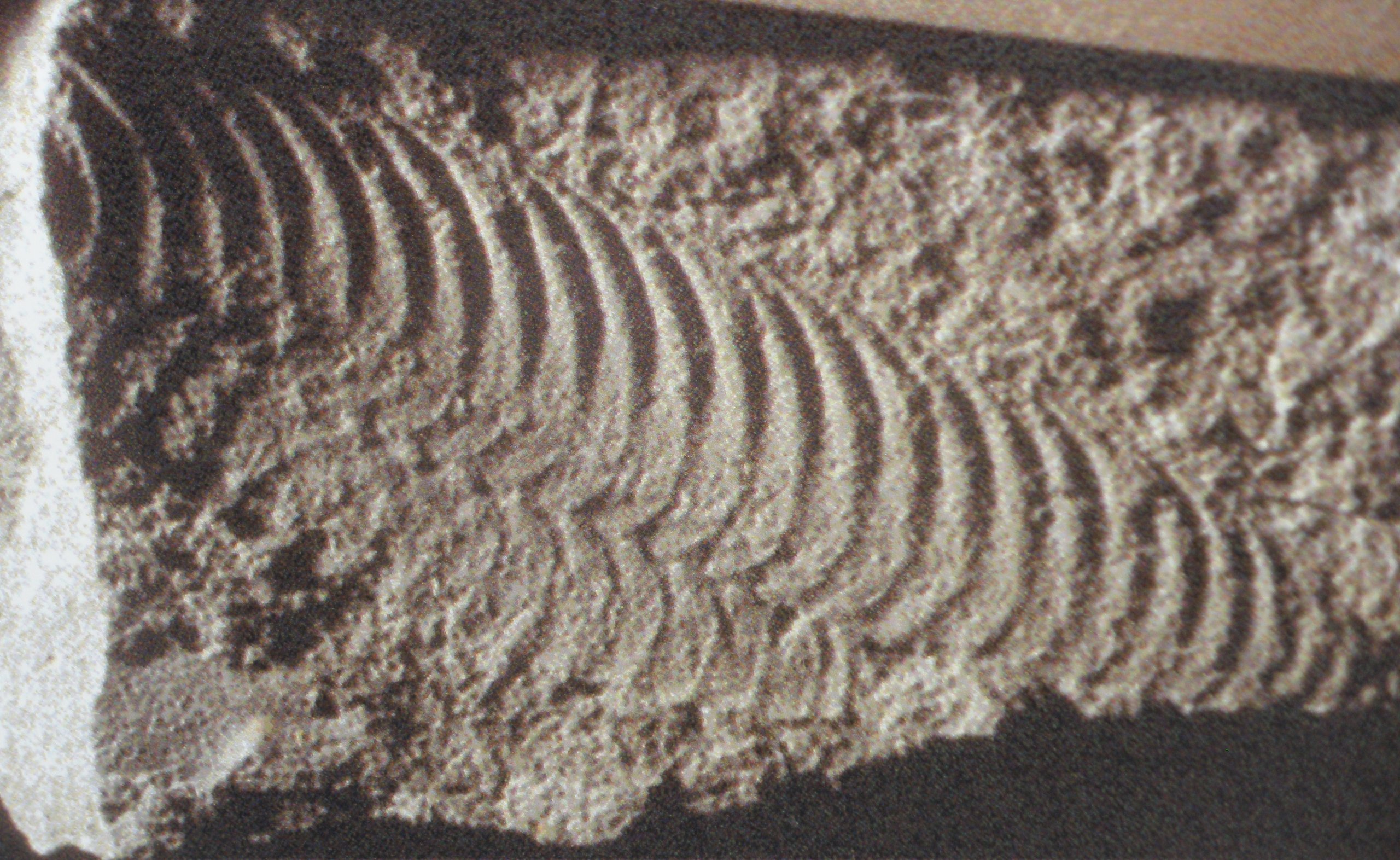
- Fossil of the mysterious Ediacaran animal Pteridinium
  †Pteridinium – tentative report
- †Ptychocaulus
  - †Ptychocaulus rodneyi – type locality for species
- †Ptychopleurella
  - †Ptychopleurella mediocostata – or unidentified comparable form
  - †Ptychopleurella uniplicata – or unidentified related form
- †Ptyocephalus
  - †Ptyocephalus declevita – or unidentified comparable form
- †Punctospirifer

== R ==
- †Radiotrabeculopora
  - †Radiotrabeculopora reticulata
- †Raphispira
  - †Raphispira plena – or unidentified comparable form
- †Raymondaspis
  - †Raymondaspis vespertina
- †Remopleurides
- †Remopleuridiella
- †Repinaella
- †Replicoskenidioides
  - †Replicoskenidioides rodneygreggi
- †Reticulariina – tentative report
  - †Reticulariina laxa
- †Rhabdomeson
- †Rhipidomella
- †Rhynchopora
  - †Rhynchopora taylori
- †Rhysostrophia
  - †Rhysostrophia nevadensis
  - †Rhysostrophia occidentalis
- †Rigbyetia
  - †Rigbyetia obconica
- †Rossoceras
- †Rotellomphalus
  - †Rotellomphalus tardus – or unidentified comparable form
- †Ruedemannia
  - †Ruedemannia lirata – or unidentified comparable form
- †Ruedemannoceras
- †Rugosochonetes
  - †Rugosochonetes californicus
  - †Rugosochonetes californucus
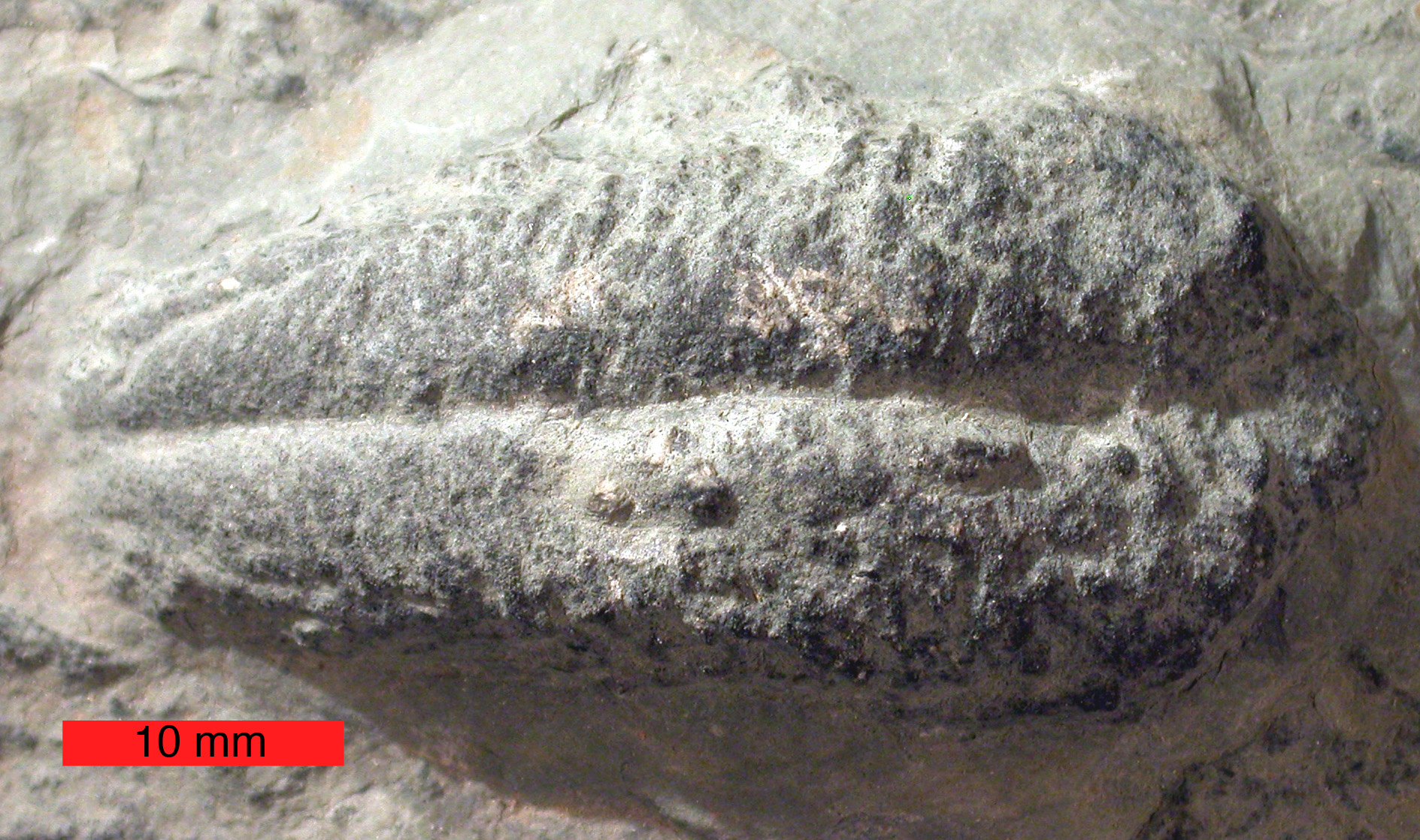
- Fossil of the arthropod burrow ichnogenus Rusophycus
  †Rusophycus

== S ==
- †Salopina
  - †Salopina horseshoensis
- †Sandolasma
  - †Sandolasma mckassoni – type locality for species
  - †Sandolasma stonei
- †Scaphorthis
- †Schistometopus
- †Schizodus
- †Schizonema
  - †Schizonema nisis – or unidentified comparable form
- †Schizophoria
  - †Schizophoria bisinuata – or unidentified comparable form
  - †Schizophoria compacta – or unidentified comparable form
- †Schubertella
  - †Schubertella kingi
  - †Schubertella minuta – type locality for species
  - †Schubertella pusilla – type locality for species
- †Schuchertella
- †Schwagerina
  - †Schwagerina aculeata
  - †Schwagerina acuminata – type locality for species
  - †Schwagerina amoena – type locality for species
  - †Schwagerina arta – type locality for species
  - †Schwagerina aspera – type locality for species
  - †Schwagerina astricta – type locality for species
  - †Schwagerina bassensis – type locality for species
  - †Schwagerina bayhaensis – type locality for species
  - †Schwagerina biconica – type locality for species
  - †Schwagerina birklundensis – type locality for species
  - †Schwagerina concinna – type locality for species
  - †Schwagerina convexa
  - †Schwagerina corpulenta – type locality for species
  - †Schwagerina curta – type locality for species
  - †Schwagerina cylindrica – type locality for species
  - †Schwagerina davisi – or unidentified comparable form
  - †Schwagerina demissa – type locality for species
  - †Schwagerina elkoensis – or unidentified comparable form
  - †Schwagerina eximia – type locality for species
  - †Schwagerina fiski – type locality for species
  - †Schwagerina harbaughi – type locality for species
  - †Schwagerina humilis – type locality for species
  - †Schwagerina juncea – type locality for species
  - †Schwagerina klamathensis – type locality for species
  - †Schwagerina laudoni – type locality for species
  - †Schwagerina longissimoidea
  - †Schwagerina mccloudensis – type locality for species
  - †Schwagerina menziesi – or unidentified comparable form
  - †Schwagerina modica
  - †Schwagerina moorei – type locality for species
  - †Schwagerina providens
  - †Schwagerina providnes
  - †Schwagerina pseudoprinceps – type locality for species
  - †Schwagerina pugunculus – or unidentified comparable form
  - †Schwagerina pulchella – type locality for species
  - †Schwagerina remissa – type locality for species
  - †Schwagerina rotunda – type locality for species
  - †Schwagerina schencki – type locality for species
  - †Schwagerina soluta – type locality for species
  - †Schwagerina spicata – type locality for species
  - †Schwagerina turgida – type locality for species
  - †Schwagerina ventricosa – type locality for species
  - †Schwagerina vervillei
  - †Schwagerina wellsensis – or unidentified comparable form
  - †Schwagerina wheeleri – type locality for species
- †Scolithes
- †Semicostella
- †Septospirifer – tentative report
- †Setigerites
- †Shamovella
- †Shastalasma
  - †Shastalasma coogani – type locality for species
  - †Shastalasma gavini – type locality for species
  - †Shastalasma woodi – type locality for species
- †Shastaphyllum – type locality for genus
  - †Shastaphyllum schucherti – type locality for species
- †Sigmelasma – type locality for genus
  - †Sigmelasma pantherae – type locality for species
- †Siskiyouspira – type locality for genus
  - †Siskiyouspira vostokovae – type locality for species
- †Skenidioides
  - †Skenidioides glindmeyeri – type locality for species
  - †Skenidioides mulifarius
  - †Skenidioides multifarius
- †Skinnerella
  - †Skinnerella davydovi – type locality for species
  - †Skinnerella hexagona – type locality for species
  - †Skinnerella mcallisteri – type locality for species
- †Spinuliplica
- †Spinulothele
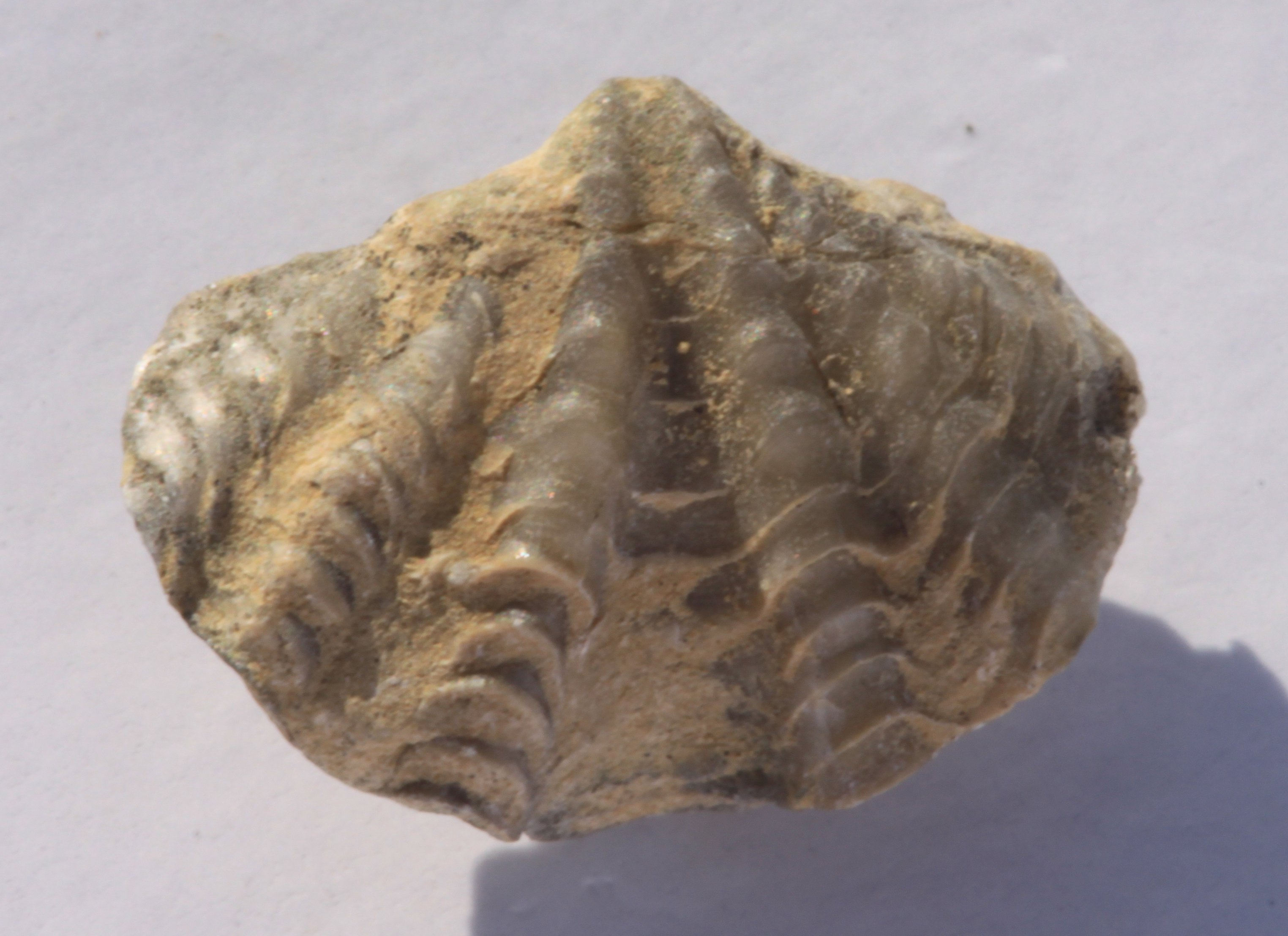
- Fossilized shell of the Late Ordovician-Late Triassic brachiopod Spirifer
  †Spirifer
  - †Spirifer brazerianus
- †Spiriferella
- †Spiriferellina
- †Spiriferina – tentative report
- †Squamularia – report made of unidentified related form or using admittedly obsolete nomenclature
- †Stacheoceras
  - †Stacheoceras antiquum – or unidentified related form
  - †Stacheoceras gordoni – type locality for species
- †Stearoceras
  - †Stearoceras phosphoriense – or unidentified related form
- †Stenoloron – tentative report
  - †Stenoloron fasciata – or unidentified related form
- †Stenoscisma
  - †Stenoscisma venustum
- †Stereostylus
  - †Stereostylus bollibokkensis – type locality for species
- †Stewartina
  - †Stewartina convexa
  - †Stewartina magnifica – type locality for species
  - †Stewartina multispira
  - †Stewartina texana
  - †Stewartina uber
  - †Stewartina ultimata – type locality for species
- †Straparollus
- †Streblochondria
- †Streblopteria
- †Streptelasma
- †Streptosolen
- †Striatifera
- †Striatopora – tentative report
  - †Striatopora gwenensis – or unidentified comparable form
- †Stricklandia – tentative report
- †Strigigenalis
- †Stylonema
  - †Stylonema potens – or unidentified comparable form
- †Swantonia
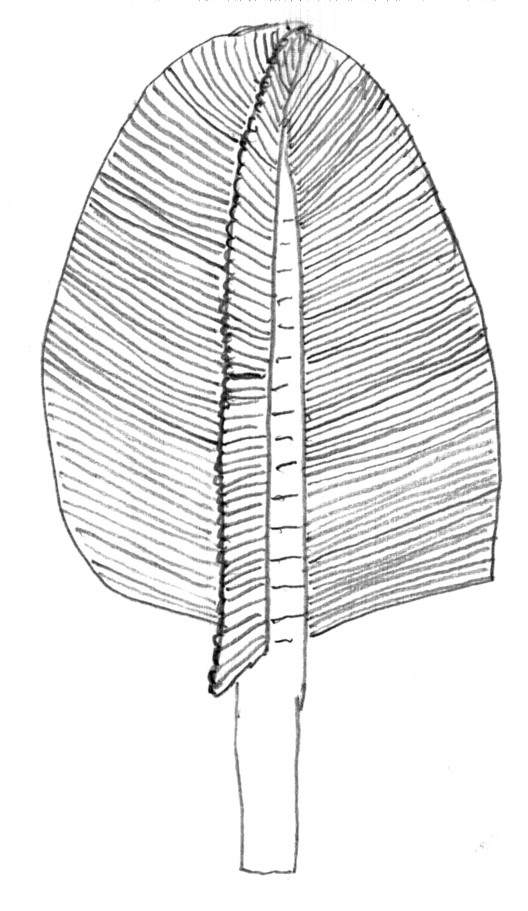
- Life restoration of the mysterious Ediacaran animal Swartpuntia
  †Swartpuntia – or unidentified comparable form
- †Symphysurina
- †Syringaxon
- †Syringopora
- †Syspacephalus
  - †Syspacephalus granulosus – tentative report
  - †Syspacephalus obscurus
  - †Syspacephalus variosus – type locality for species

== T ==
- †Taphrhelminthopsis
  - †Taphrhelminthopsis nelsoni
- †Taphrorthis – tentative report
- †Temnodiscus – tentative report
  - †Temnodiscus euryomphalus
- †Thairoplax
  - †Thairoplax merriami – type locality for species
- †Thamniscus – report made of unidentified related form or using admittedly obsolete nomenclature
- †Thamnosia
  - †Thamnosia arctica
- †Thompsonella
  - †Thompsonella cylindrica – type locality for species
  - †Thompsonella rugosa – type locality for species
- †Timaniella
  - †Timaniella pseudocamerata
- †Tonopahella – type locality for genus
  - †Tonopahella goldfieldensis – type locality for species
  - †Tonopahella walcotti
- †Torynifer
- †Trematospira
- †Trepospira
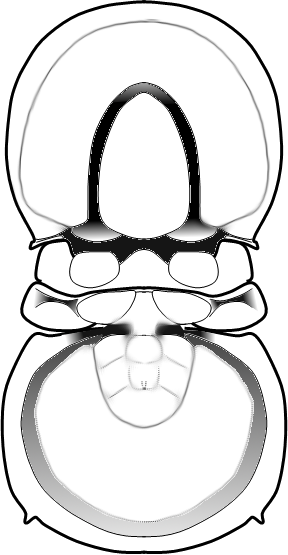
- Illustration of a fossil of the Cambrian trilobite Trinodus
  †Trinodus
  - †Trinodus clusus – or unidentified comparable form
- †Triticites
  - †Triticites bensonensis
  - †Triticites brevis – type locality for species
  - †Triticites burgessae – or unidentified comparable form
  - †Triticites buttensis
  - †Triticites californicus
  - †Triticites cellamagnus
  - †Triticites elegantoides
  - †Triticites gigantocellus
  - †Triticites hermanni – type locality for species
  - †Triticites invenustus – type locality for species
  - †Triticites muddiensis
  - †Triticites mulleri – type locality for species
  - †Triticites occidentalis – type locality for species
  - †Triticites schencki – type locality for species
  - †Triticites tumentis – type locality for species
  - †Triticites usitatus – type locality for species
  - †Triticites ventricosus – or unidentified related form
  - †Triticites viribus – type locality for species
- †Trocholites – tentative report
- †Trochonema
  - †Trochonema liljevalli – type locality for species
- †Trochonemella – tentative report
  - †Trochonemella mikulici – type locality for species
- †Tschussovskenia
  - †Tschussovskenia connorsensis

== U ==
- †Unispirifer

== V ==
- †Valcourea
  - †Valcourea plana – or unidentified comparable form
- †Verneuilia
- †Volborthella
  - †Volborthella tenuis
- †Volocephalina
  - †Volocephalina connexa
  - †Volocephalina contracta

== W ==
- †Waagenoconcha – tentative report
- †Waagenophyllum
  - †Waagenophyllum klamathensis – type locality for species
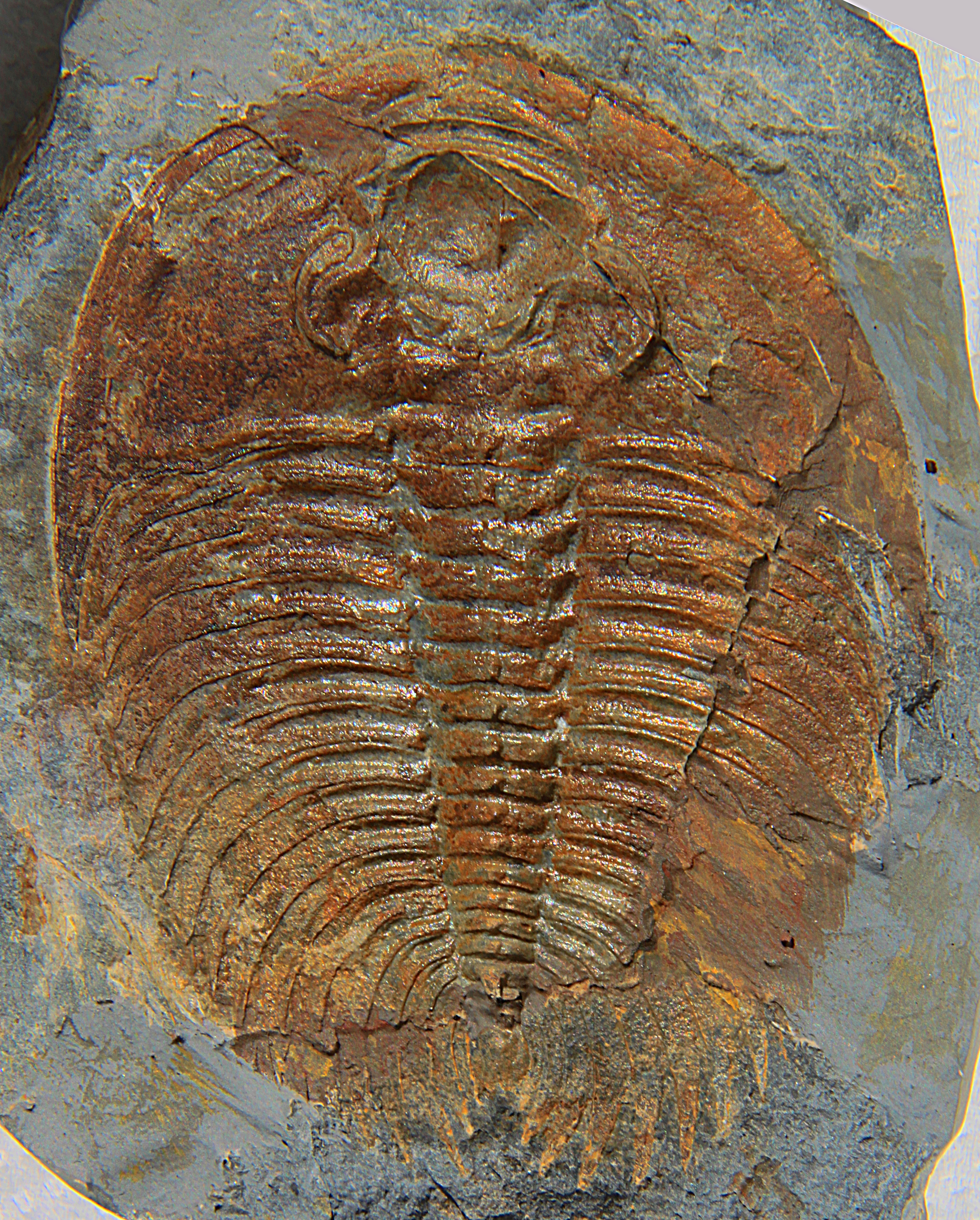
- Fossil of the Cambrian trilobite Wanneria
  †Wanneria
- †Waucobella
  - †Waucobella nelsoni
- †Wellerella
  - †Wellerella hemiplicata – or unidentified comparable form
  - †Wellerella rotunda – or unidentified comparable form
- †Wenkchemnia
  - †Wenkchemnia spinicollus – tentative report
  - †Wenkchemnia sulcata
- †Westgardia
  - †Westgardia gigantea – type locality for species
- †Wexolina – type locality for genus
  - †Wexolina tombstonensis – type locality for species
- †Whitfieldella – tentative report
- †Wilsonastraea – type locality for genus
  - †Wilsonastraea fluvius – type locality for species
  - †Wilsonastraea parva – type locality for species
  - †Wilsonastraea smithi – type locality for species
- †Wintunastraea – type locality for genus
  - †Wintunastraea stanleyi – type locality for species
- †Wyattia

== X ==
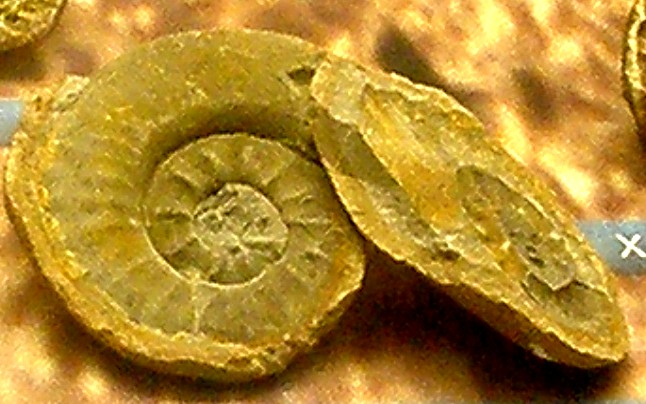
- Fossilized shells of the ammonoid cephalopod Xenodiscus
  †Xenodiscus
  - †Xenodiscus carbonarius – or unidentified related form
- †Xenostegium
- †Xestotrema
  - †Xestotrema pulchrum

== Y ==
- †Yakovlevia
  - †Yakovlevia californica – type locality for species

== Z ==
- †Zacanthoides
- †Zacanthopsis
- †Zelophyllum
