= Prostacheoceras =

Prostacheoceras Temporal range: Asselian–Wordian

Scientific classification
- Kingdom: Animalia
- Phylum: Mollusca
- Class: Cephalopoda
- Subclass: †Ammonoidea
- Order: †Goniatitida
- Family: †Vidrioceratidae
- Subfamily: †Vidrioceratinae
- Genus: †Prostacheoceras; Ruzhentsev, 1937

Genus of molluscs (fossil)

Prostacheoceras is genus of ammonoid cephalopods belonging to the Vidrioceratidae family. Species belonging to this genus lived in early to middle Permian.

== Species and distribution ==
- Prostacheoceras alter Leonova, 1989: Artinskian - Roadian of Tajikistan and Thailand
- Prostacheoceras benedictinum Gemmellaro, 1887: Wordian of Italy
- Prostacheoceras burnense Tumanskaia, 1931: Roadian of Russia (Crimea)
- Prostacheoceras chinense Wang, 1983: Asselian - Wordian of China (Xinjiang). Nomen nudum, as it is based only on fragmentary specimen. Unsure age assignment.
- Prostacheoceras darvasicum Leonova, 1992: Kungurian of Tajikistan
- Prostacheoceras dentatum Ruzhentsev, 1938: synonym of P. juresanense
- Prostacheoceras geminum Ruzhentsev, 1938: synonym of P. juresanense
- Prostacheoceras juresanense Maksimova, 1935: Asselian of Kazakhstan (South Urals), Russia (South Urals)
- Prostacheoceras langi Termier & Termier, 1970: Artinskian - Kungurian of Afghanistan and China (Xinjiang)
- Prostacheoceras longilobatum Liang, 1982: Wordian of China (Jilin)
- Prostacheoceras multidentatum Tumanskaia, 1931: Roadian of Russia (Crimea). Nomen nudum.
- Prostacheoceras oschense Tumanskaia, 1938: Roadian - Wordian of Tajikistan
- Prostacheoceras principale Bogoslovskaia & Popov, 1986: Asselian of Kazakhstan (South Urals)
- Prostacheoceras saundersi Nassichuk, 1977: Wordian of Canada (British Columbia)
- Prostacheoceras shaoyangense Zhou, 1987: Wordian - Capitanian of China (Hunan)
- Prostacheoceras skinneri Miller, 1945: Kungurian of Malaysia and USA (Texas)
- Prostacheoceras strictum Bogoslovskaia, 1978: Asselian of Tajikistan
- Prostacheoceras tauricum Tumanskaia, 1917: Roadian of Russia (Crimea)
