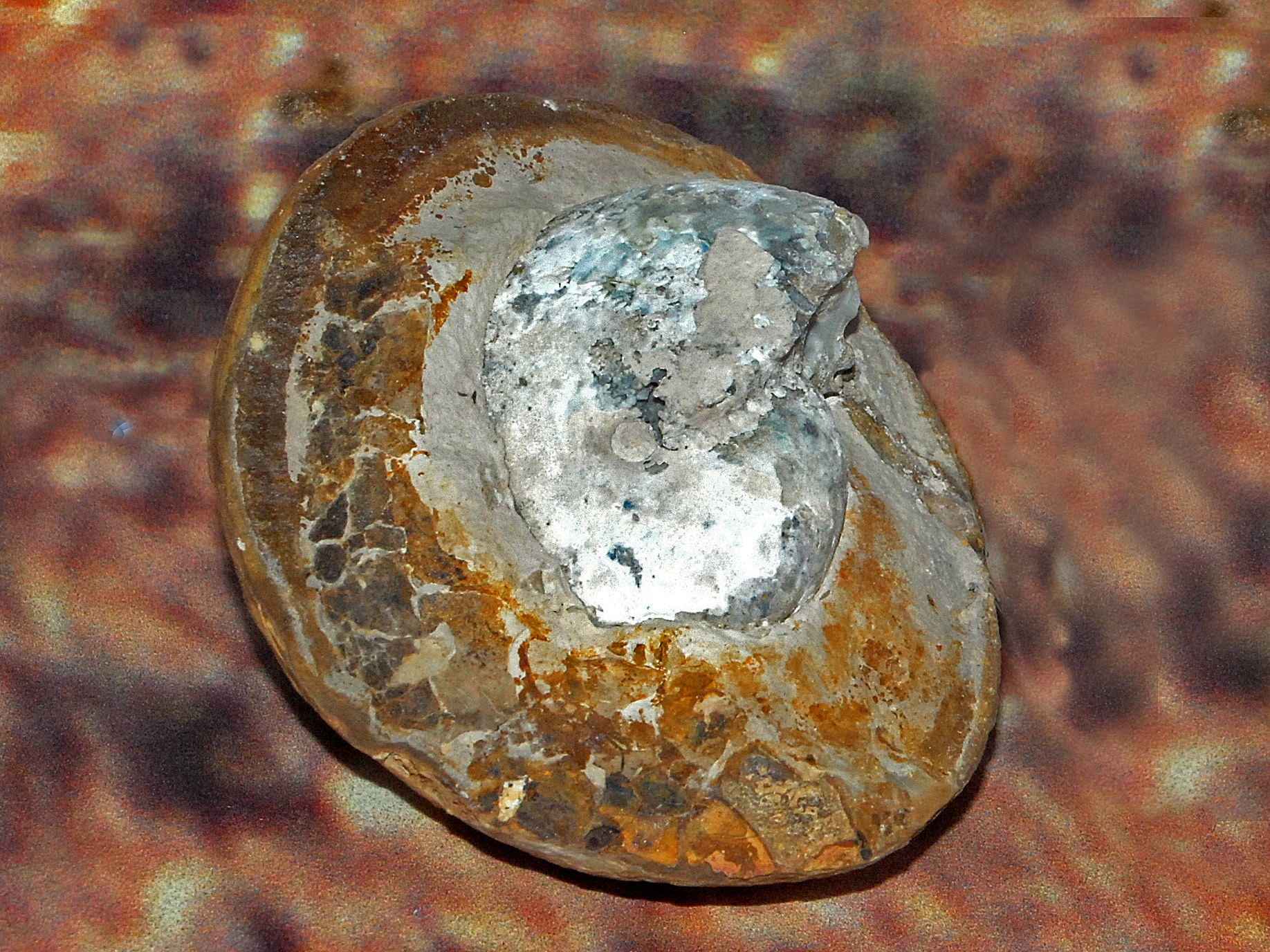
- Cyclolobus walkeri

Scientific classification
- Kingdom: Animalia
- Phylum: Mollusca
- Class: Cephalopoda
- Subclass: †Ammonoidea
- Order: †Goniatitida
- Family: †Cyclolobidae
- Genus: †Cyclolobus; Waagen (1879)

Species
- C. kiselevae; C. kullingi; C. oldhami; C. persulcatus; C. ruzhencevi; C. teicherti; C. walkeri; C. zhongbaensis

= Cyclolobus =

Cyclolobus Temporal range: 259.0–252.3 Ma

Clyclolobus is a smooth, essentially involute subdiscoidal goniatitid ammonoid that has sutures with a bifurcate ventral lobe, flared outwardly at the end, in which the halves may be secondarily trifurcated, ending in sharp, narrow projections. Lateral sutural elements follow an acuate line that swings first to the front, then sharply to the rear before becoming hidden by the next whorl. Saddles are narrow, cumulous in appearance with short, irregular, rounded sub-endings. Ventro-lateal lobes are trifurcate with pointed, thornlike projections.

Cycolobus is a member (Genus) of the Cyclolobidae, a family in the goniatitid superfamily Cyclolobaceae. It has been found for example in Upper Permian sediments in Pakistan and India (Salt Range and Himalaya), south China, Madagascar, and Greenland. According to W. M. Furnish et al. 2009 (revised Treatise Part L) Cyclolobus belongs to the subfamily Cyclolobinae.
