= Waagenina =

Scientific classification
- Kingdom: Animalia
- Phylum: Mollusca
- Class: Cephalopoda
- Subclass: †Ammonoidea
- Order: †Goniatitida
- Family: †Vidrioceratidae
- Genus: †Waagenina; Krotow, 1888

Genus of molluscs (fossil)

Waagenina is an extinct genus of ammonite.
