= Cycloloboidea =

Scientific classification
- Kingdom: Animalia
- Phylum: Mollusca
- Class: Cephalopoda
- Subclass: †Ammonoidea
- Order: †Goniatitida
- Suborder: †Goniatitina
- Superfamily: †Cycloloboidea; Zittel, 1895

Families
- Cyclolobidae; Neostacheoceratidae; Vidrioceratidae

Synonyms
- Cyclolobaceae

Extinct superfamily of molluscs

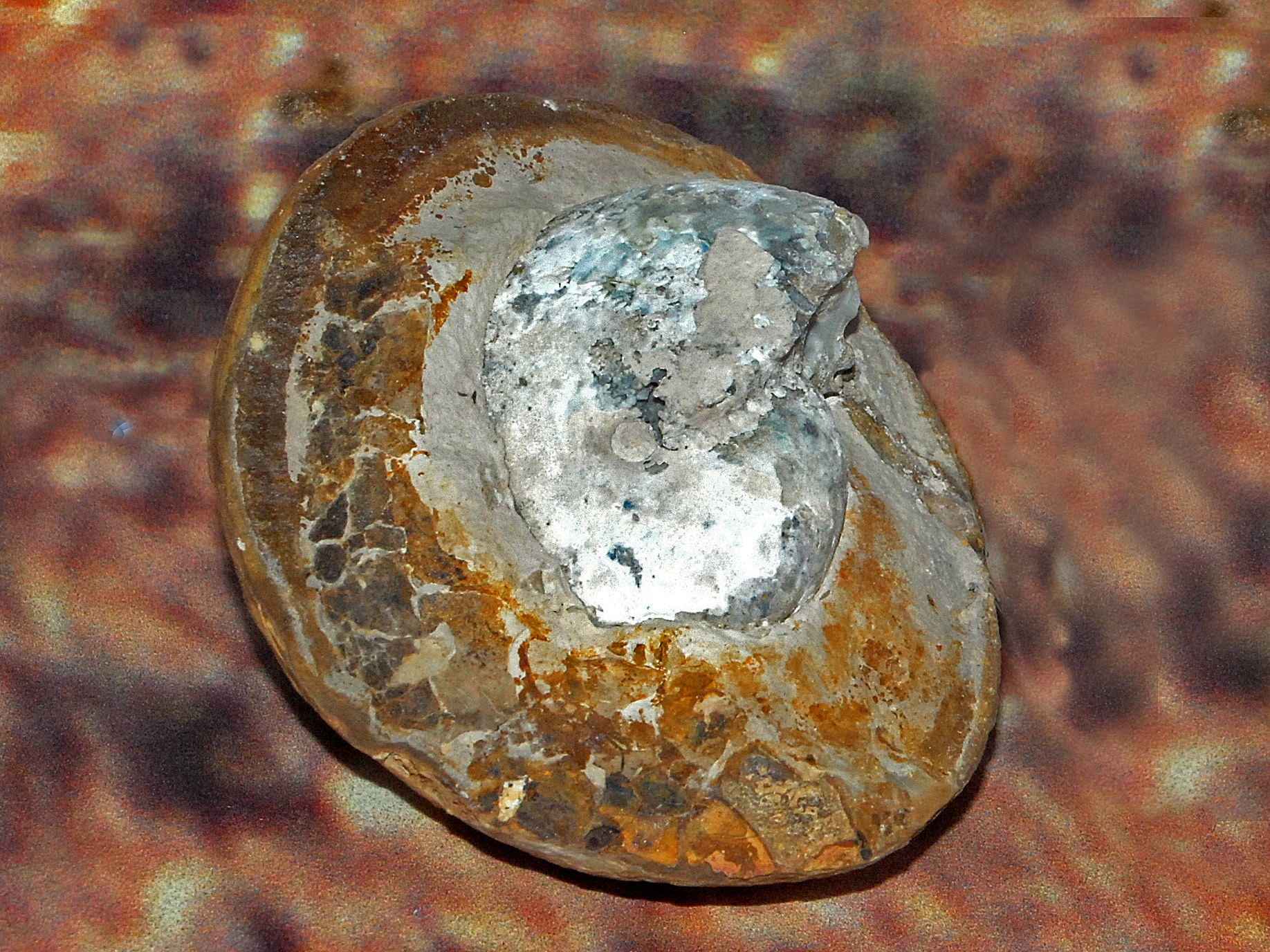
Cyclolobus walkeri

Cycloloboidea is one of seventeen superfamilies of the Goniatitina suborder. They are an extinct group of ammonoid, which are shelled cephalopods related to squids, belemnites, octopodes, and cuttlefish, and more distantly to the nautiloids.
