= Peritrochia =

Peritrochia Temporal range: Permian

Scientific classification
- Domain: Eukaryota
- Kingdom: Animalia
- Phylum: Mollusca
- Class: Cephalopoda
- Subclass: †Ammonoidea
- Order: †Goniatitida
- Family: †Vidrioceratidae
- Genus: †Peritrochia; Girty 1908

Species
- P. erebus Girty 1908

Extinct family of molluscs

Peritrochia is an extinct genus of ammonite belonging to the order Goniatitida and family Vidrioceratidae. Specimens have been recovered from Permian beds in North America and East Timor.
