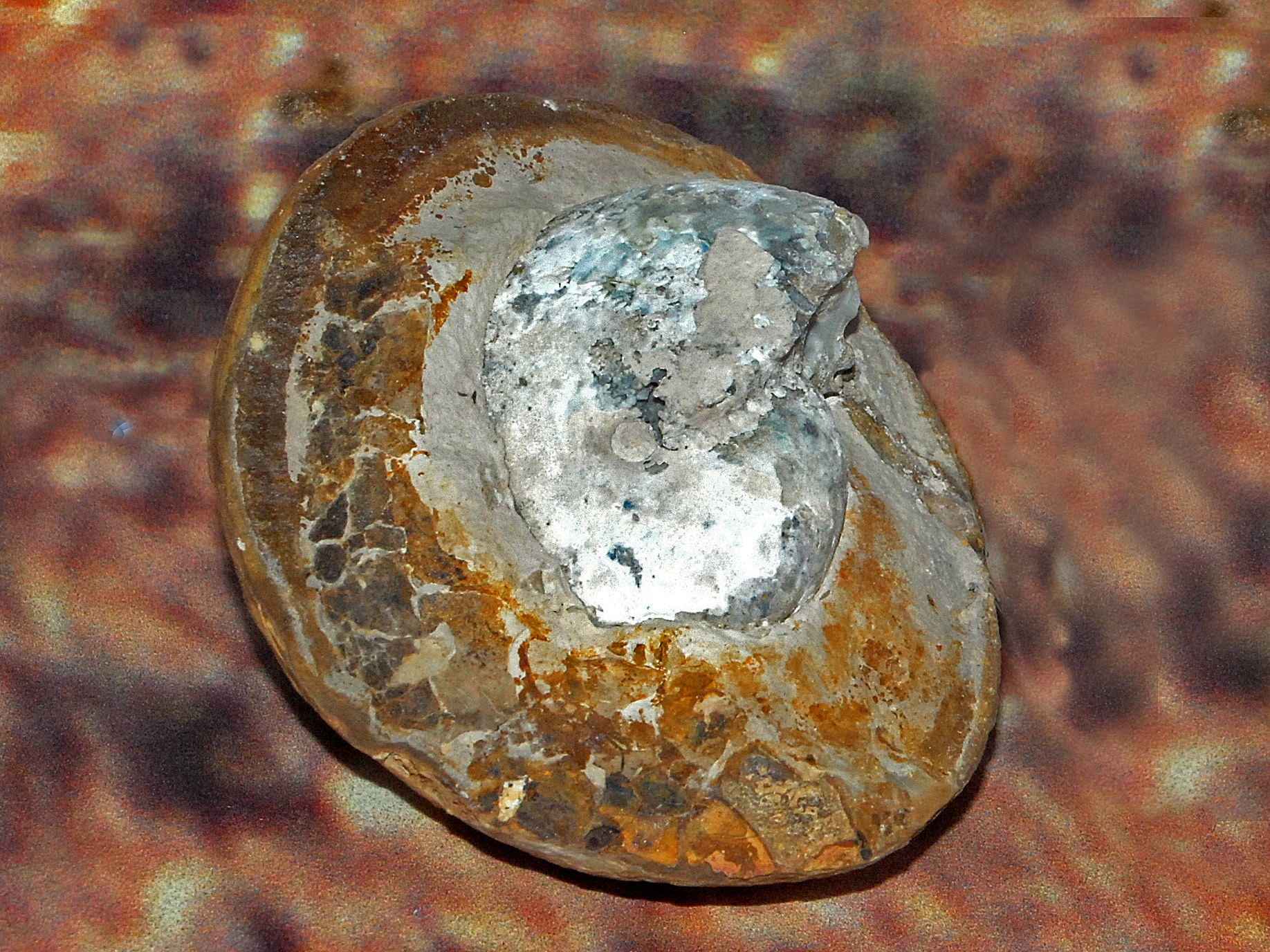
- Cyclolobus walkeri

Scientific classification
- Kingdom: Animalia
- Phylum: Mollusca
- Class: Cephalopoda
- Subclass: †Ammonoidea
- Order: †Goniatitida
- Superfamily: †Cycloloboidea
- Family: †Cyclolobidae; Schindewolf, 1931

= Cyclolobidae =

Cyclolobidae Temporal range: Middle Permian–Upper Permian

Family of molluscs (fossil)

Cyclolobidae: Goniatitid Ammonoidea belonging to the Cycloloboidea with thickly discoidal to subglobular shells with a small but open umbilicus and ammonitic sutures with numerous lobes that have subparallel sides.

The Cyclolobidae is one of three families of the Superfamily Cyclolobaceae; an extinct group of ammonoid cephalopods from the Late Paleozoic.
