= Vidrioceratidae =

Scientific classification
- Kingdom: Animalia
- Phylum: Mollusca
- Class: Cephalopoda
- Subclass: †Ammonoidea
- Order: †Goniatitida
- Superfamily: †Cycloloboidea
- Family: †Vidrioceratidae; Plummer & Scott 1939

Subfamilies
- Hyattoceratinae; Vidrioceratinae

Extinct family of molluscs

Vidrioceratidae is one of three families of the Cyclolobaceae Superfamily. They are an extinct group of ammonoid, which are shelled cephalopods related to squids, belemnites, octopuses, and cuttlefish, and more distantly to the nautiloids.
