= List of the Paleozoic life of Arkansas =

This list of the Paleozoic life of Arkansas contains the various prehistoric life-forms whose fossilized remains have been reported from within the US state of Arkansas and are between 541 and 252.17 million years of age.

== A ==
- †Adnatoceras
  - †Adnatoceras alaskense
- †Ahrensisporites
  - †Ahrensisporites guerickei
- †Amphiscapha
  - †Amphiscapha intermedius
- †Amphissites
  - †Amphissites rugosus
- †Amplexizaphrentis
  - †Amplexizaphrentis maneri – type locality for species
- †Amplexizaphretis
  - †Amplexizaphretis maneri – type locality for species
- †Amplexus
- †Ananaspis
- †Anchicrinus
  - †Anchicrinus planulatus
- †Ancillotoechia
  - †Ancillotoechia marginata
- †Angyomphalus
  - †Angyomphalus desultoria – type locality for species
  - †Angyomphalus discus
- †Anomphalomorpha – report made of unidentified related form or using admittedly obsolete nomenclature
- †Anthracoceras
  - †Anthracoceras paucilobum
- †Anthracomartus
  - †Anthracomartus trilobitus – type locality for species
- †Anthracospirifer
- †Antiquatonia
- †Antirhynchonella
  - †Antirhynchonella thomasi
- †Aphelaeceras
  - †Aphelaeceras arkansanum – type locality for species
- †Aphralysia – tentative report
- †Apiculatasporites
  - †Apiculatasporites variocorneus
- †Apotocardium
  - †Apotocardium peculiare – type locality for species
  - †Apotocardium polymitarium – type locality for species
  - †Apotocardium snideri – tentative report
- †Arcanoceras
  - †Arcanoceras furnishi – type locality for species
- †Archaeocidaris
- Archaeolithophyllum – tentative report
- †Archimastax
  - †Archimastax americanus – type locality for species
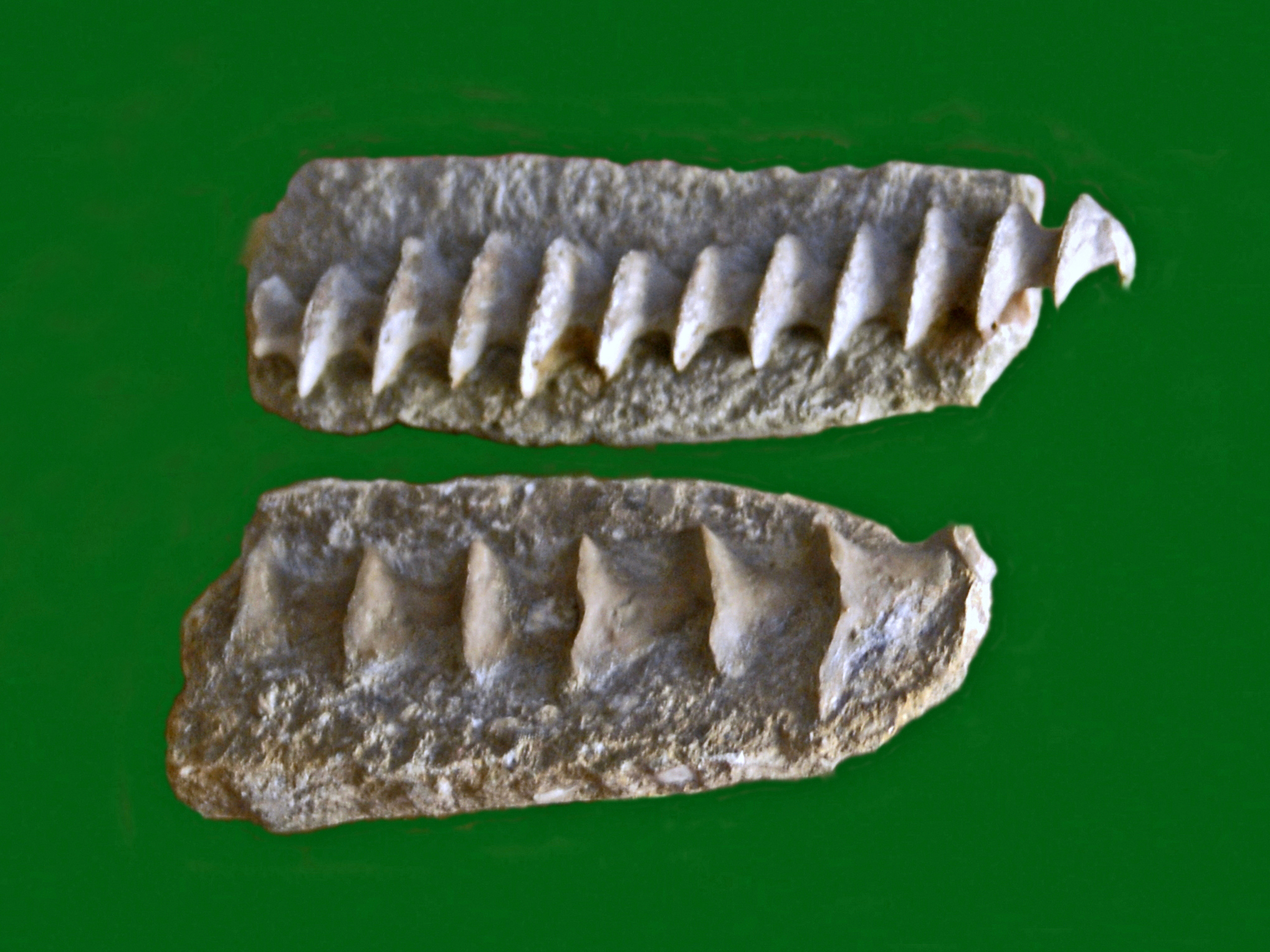
- Fossils of the Carboniferous-Permian bryozoan Archimedes
  †Archimedes
- †Archimylacris
  - †Archimylacris venusta – type locality for species
- †Arkacrinus
  - †Arkacrinus dubius
- †Arkanites
  - †Arkanites relictus
- †Arkoceras
  - †Arkoceras exiguum
- †Asketomorpha – type locality for genus
  - †Asketomorpha grandis – type locality for species
- †Asphaltina
- †Astartella
  - †Astartella concentrica – or unidentified comparable form
- †Athyris
- †Atrypa
- †Atrypina
  - †Atrypina erugata
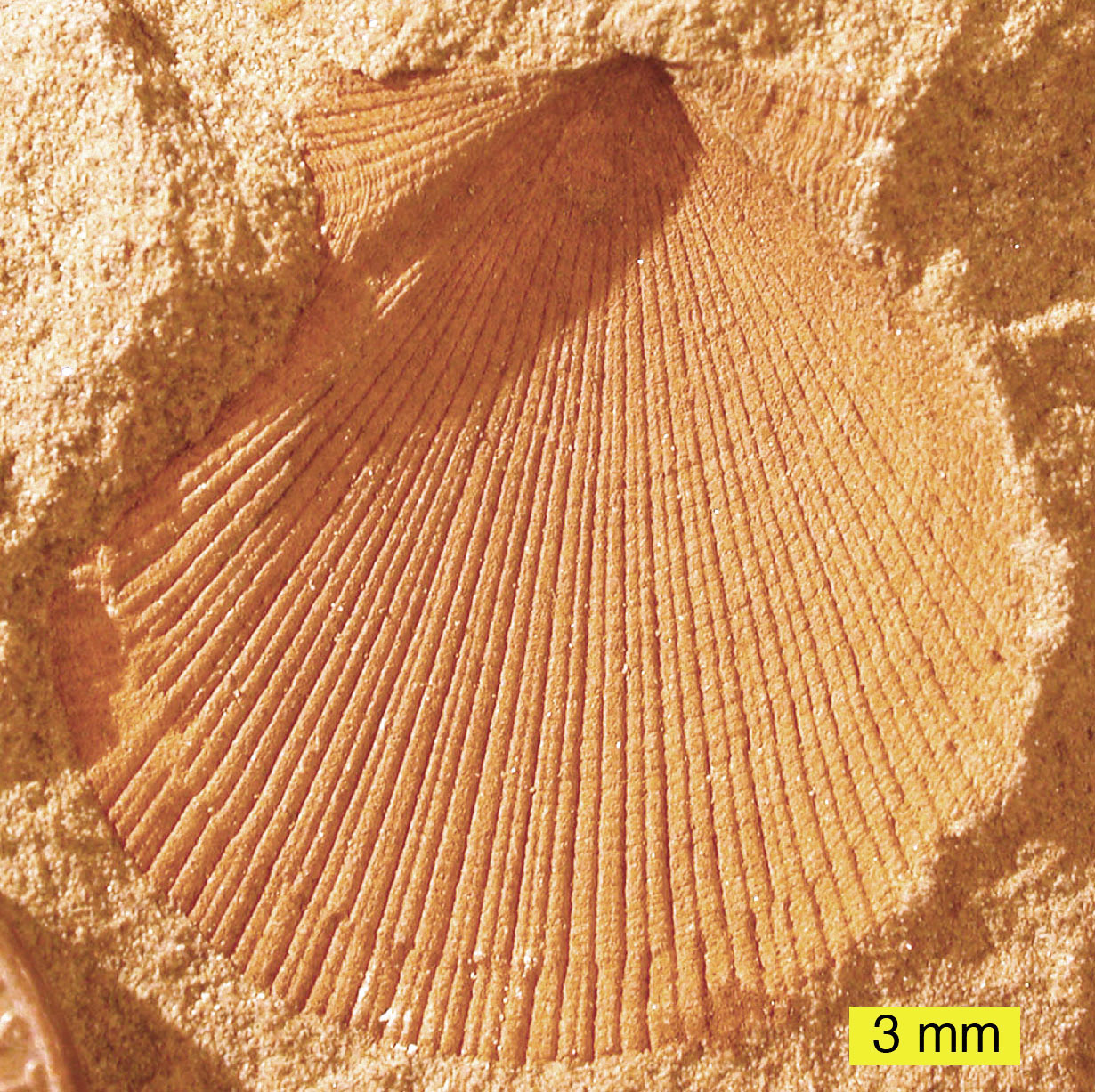
- Mold fossil of a shell of the Early Devonian-Late Triassic bivalve Aviculopecten
  †Aviculopecten
  - †Aviculopecten inspeciosus
  - †Aviculopecten jennyi
  - †Aviculopecten morrowensis
  - †Aviculopecten squamula
- † Avonia
  - †Avonia honeycreekensis
- †Axinolobus
  - †Axinolobus modulus – type locality for species

== B ==
- †Bactrites
  - †Bactrites carbonarius
  - †Bactrites gaitherensis
  - †Bactrites redactus
  - †Bactrites smithianus
- †Bactritimimus
  - †Bactritimimus girtyi – type locality for species
  - †Bactritimimus ulrichi – type locality for species
- †Baiosoma
  - †Baiosoma cucullata – type locality for species
- Bairdia
  - †Bairdia girtyi
- †Barytichisma
  - †Barytichisma clubinei
  - †Barytichisma ozarkana
- †Baschkirites
  - †Baschkirites librovitchi
- †Beecheria
- †Bellerophon
  - †Bellerophon welshi
- †Bisatoceras
  - †Bisatoceras secundum
- †Bistrialites
  - †Bistrialites bicostatus – type locality for species
- †Boesites
  - †Boesites scotti
- †Borestus
- †Boucotides
  - †Boucotides barrandei
- †Brachycycloceras
  - †Brachycycloceras washingtonense – type locality for species
- †Brachymimulus
  - †Brachymimulus americanus
  - †Brachymimulus elongatus
- †Brachythyris
- †Bradyphyllum
  - †Bradyphyllum lesliense – type locality for species
- †Branneroceras
  - †Branneroceras branneri
- †Bridgeites
  - †Bridgeites planidorsalis – type locality for species
- †Buttsia
  - †Buttsia drabensis
- †Buxtonia

== C ==
- †Cancelloceras
  - †Cancelloceras hunstvillense – type locality for species
  - †Cancelloceras huntsvillense – type locality for species
- †Caneyella
  - †Caneyella peculiaris
  - †Caneyella percostata
  - †Caneyella wapanuckensis – or unidentified comparable form
- †Caninostrotion
  - †Caninostrotion variabilis
- †Carcharopsis
  - †Carcharopsis wortheni
- †Cardiomorpha – tentative report
  - †Cardiomorpha inflata
- †Caryocrinites
- †Cavellina
- †Cavusgnathus
- †Centrotarphyceras
  - †Centrotarphyceras yellvillense
- †Ceratopea
  - †Ceratopea unguis
- †Cheilocephalus
  - †Cheilocephalus brachyops
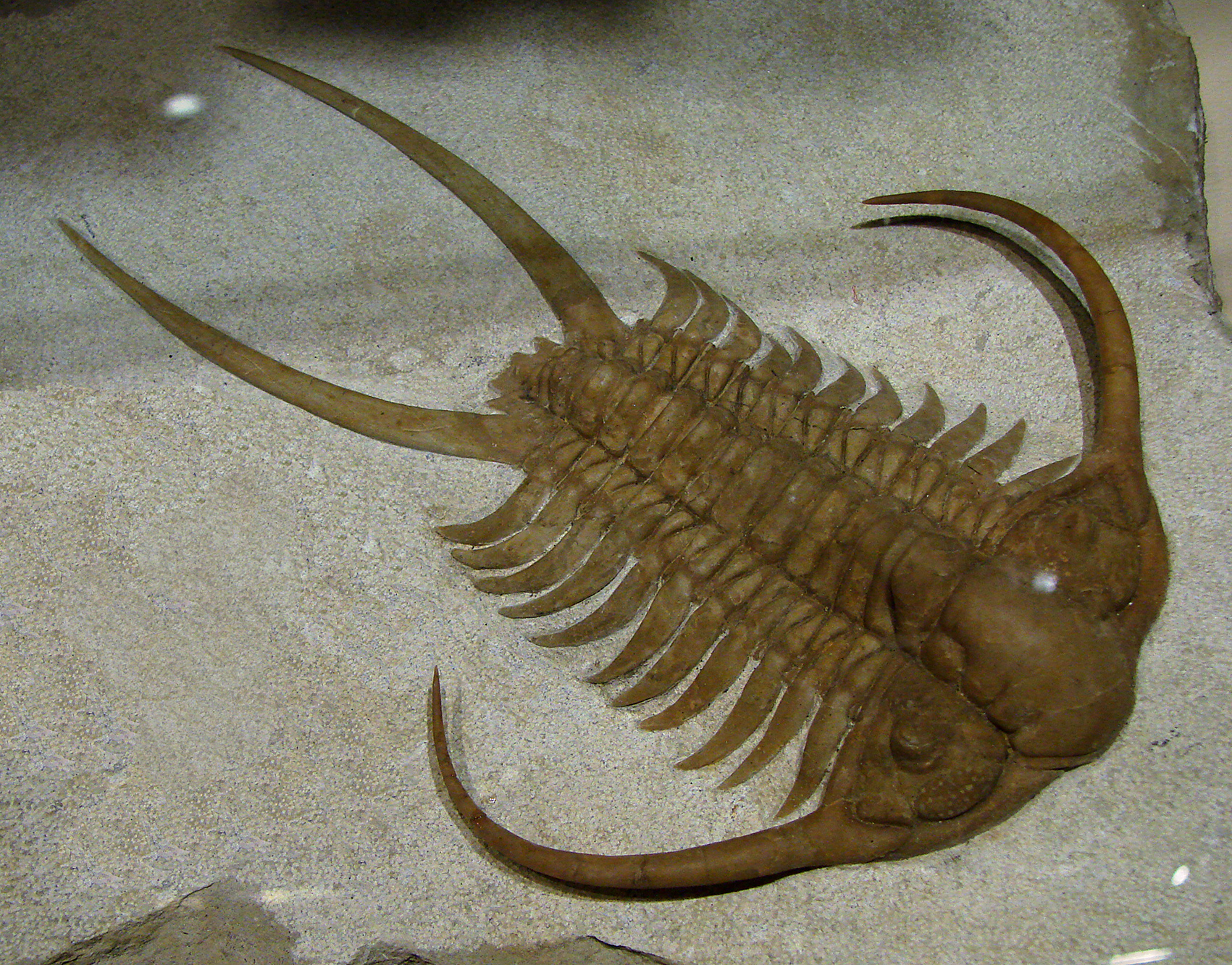
- Fossil of the Cambrian-Middle Devonian trilobite Cheirurus
  †Cheirurus
  - †Cheirurus phollikodes – type locality for species
  - †Cheirurus prolixus – type locality for species
- †Choctawites
  - †Choctawites choctawensis
- †Chonetes
- †Clathrospira
  - †Clathrospira virguncula
- †Cleiothyridina
- †Cliffia
  - †Cliffia lataegenae
- †Cluthoceras
  - †Cluthoceras glicki – type locality for species
- †Clytoceras
  - †Clytoceras capax
- †Coelogasteroceras
  - †Coelogasteroceras gracile
- †Comanchia
  - †Comanchia amplooculata
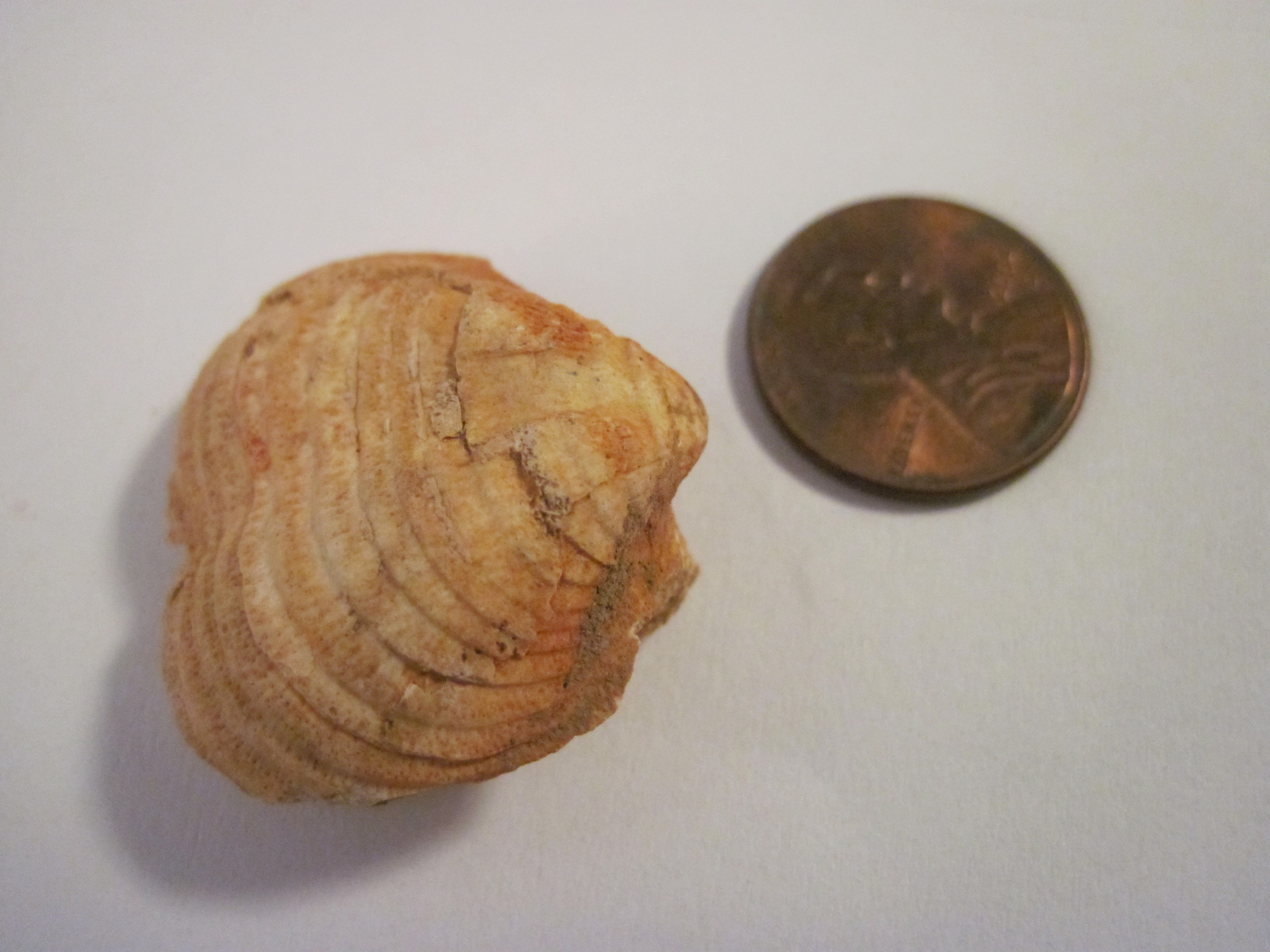
- Fossilized shell of the Late Devonian-Permian brachiopod Composita
  †Composita
- †Compsonema
- †Convolutispora
- †Copiceras
  - †Copiceras erectum
- †Cornuproetus
  - †Cornuproetus kyphora – type locality for species
- †Cranaena
- †Crassispora
  - †Crassispora kosankei
- †Cravenoceras
  - †Cravenoceras lineolatum – type locality for species
- †Criboconcha
- †Cristatisporites
  - †Cristatisporites connexus
  - †Cristatisporites indignabundus
- †Cromyocrinus
  - †Cromyocrinus grandis – type locality for species
- †Crurithyris
  - †Crurithyris parva
- †Ctenobactrites
  - †Ctenobactrites lesliensis – type locality for species
- †Cupulocorona
  - †Cupulocorona gemmiformis
  - †Cupulocorona osgoodensis
- †Cyclogranisporites
- †Cycloplectoceras
  - †Cycloplectoceras funatum
  - †Cycloplectoceras miseri
- †Cymoceras
  - †Cymoceras cracens
- †Cymostrophia – report made of unidentified related form or using admittedly obsolete nomenclature
- †Cypricardella
  - †Cypricardella subalata
- †Cypricardinia – tentative report
  - †Cypricardinia fayettevillensis
- †Cyrtina

== D ==
- †Dalmanites – type locality for genus
  - †Dalmanites bassleri
  - †Dalmanites howelli
  - †Dalmanites ptyktorhion – type locality for species
- †Decoroproetus
  - †Decoroproetus anaglyptus – type locality for species
  - †Decoroproetus corycoeus
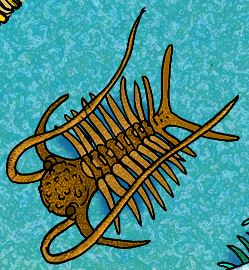
- Life restoration of two species of the Silurian trilobite Deiphon
  †Deiphon
  - †Deiphon longifrons
- †Dellea
  - †Dellea suada
- †Delops
- †Densosporites
  - †Densosporites annulatus
  - †Densosporites irregularis
  - †Densosporites sphaerotriangularis
  - †Densosporites triangularis
- †Dentoceras
  - †Dentoceras belemnitiforme – type locality for species
- †Desmoinesia
- †Diaboloceras
  - †Diaboloceras neumeieri – type locality for species
  - †Diaboloceras varicostatum
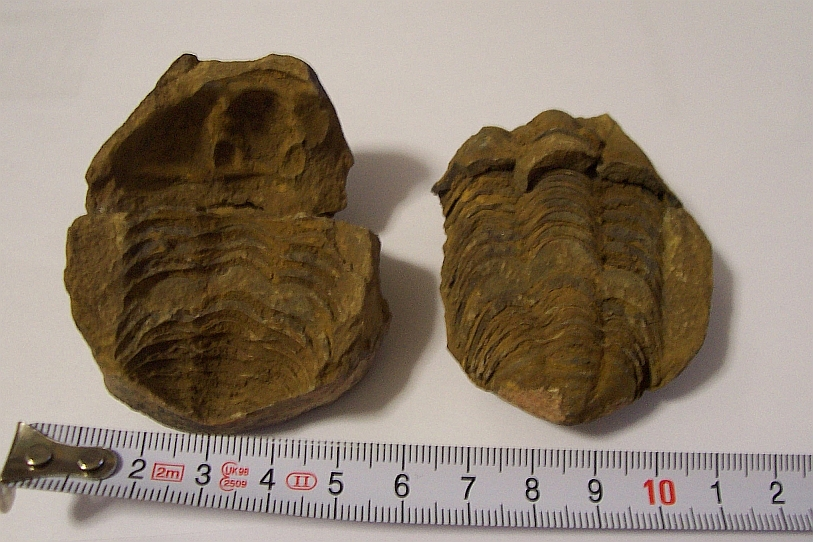
- Fossil and mold of the Late Ordovician-Silurian trilobite Diacalymene
  †Diacalymene
  - †Diacalymene altirostris
- †Diacamaropsis
  - †Diacamaropsis parva
- †Diaphragmus
- †Dicamaropsis
  - †Dicamaropsis parva
- †Dicoelosia
  - †Dicoelosia bilobella
- †Dielasma
- †Dinocycloceras
  - †Dinocycloceras ballianum – or unidentified comparable form
  - †Dinocycloceras prolixum
- †Diphuicrinus
  - †Diphuicrinus croneisi
- †Dolerorthis – tentative report
  - †Dolerorthis nanella
- †Dolorthoceras
  - †Dolorthoceras caneyanum – or unidentified comparable form
  - †Dolorthoceras incisum – type locality for species
  - †Dolorthoceras tenuifilosum – type locality for species

== E ==
- †Echinaria
- †Echinoconchus
- †Economolopsis – type locality for genus
  - †Economolopsis gordoni – type locality for species
- †Ectogrammysia – type locality for genus
  - †Ectogrammysia crassatis – type locality for species
- †Edmondia
  - †Edmondia equilateralis
- †Edmooroceras
  - †Edmooroceras plummeri
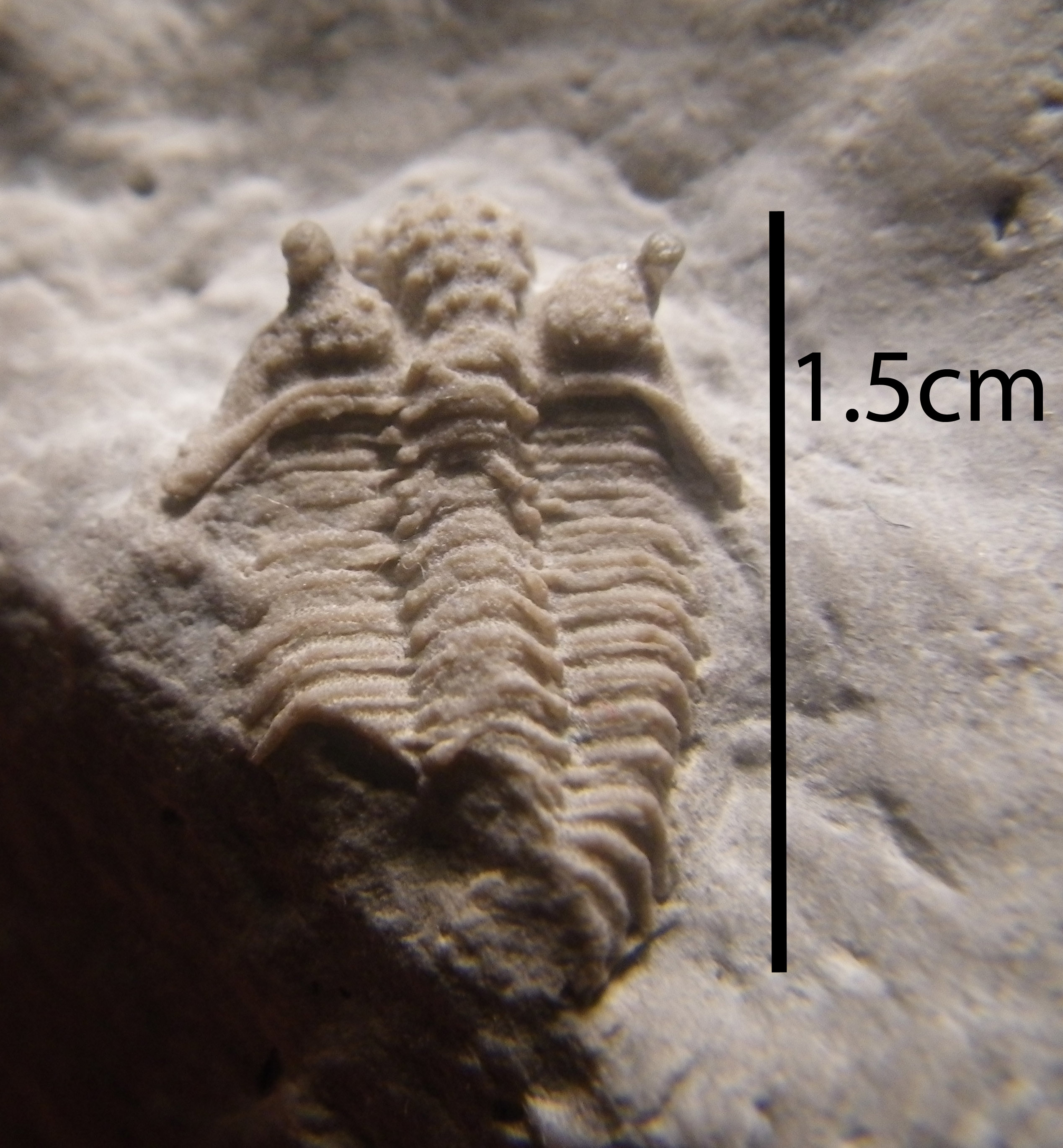
- Fossil of the Middle Ordovician-Early Devonian trilobite Encrinurus
  †Encrinurus
  - †Encrinurus egani
- †Endolobus
  - †Endolobus clorensis
- †Eoasianites
  - †Eoasianites smithwickensis
- †Eophacops
  - †Eophacops fontana – type locality for species
- †Eopteria
  - †Eopteria richardsoni
- †Eospirifer
  - †Eospirifer acutolineatus
- †Eowellerites
  - †Eowellerites discoidalis – type locality for species
  - †Eowellerites moorei – or unidentified comparable form
- †Ephippioceras
  - †Ephippioceras ferratum
- †Epistroboceras
  - †Epistroboceras lesliense – type locality for species
  - †Epistroboceras mangeri – type locality for species
  - †Epistroboceras pitkinense – type locality for species
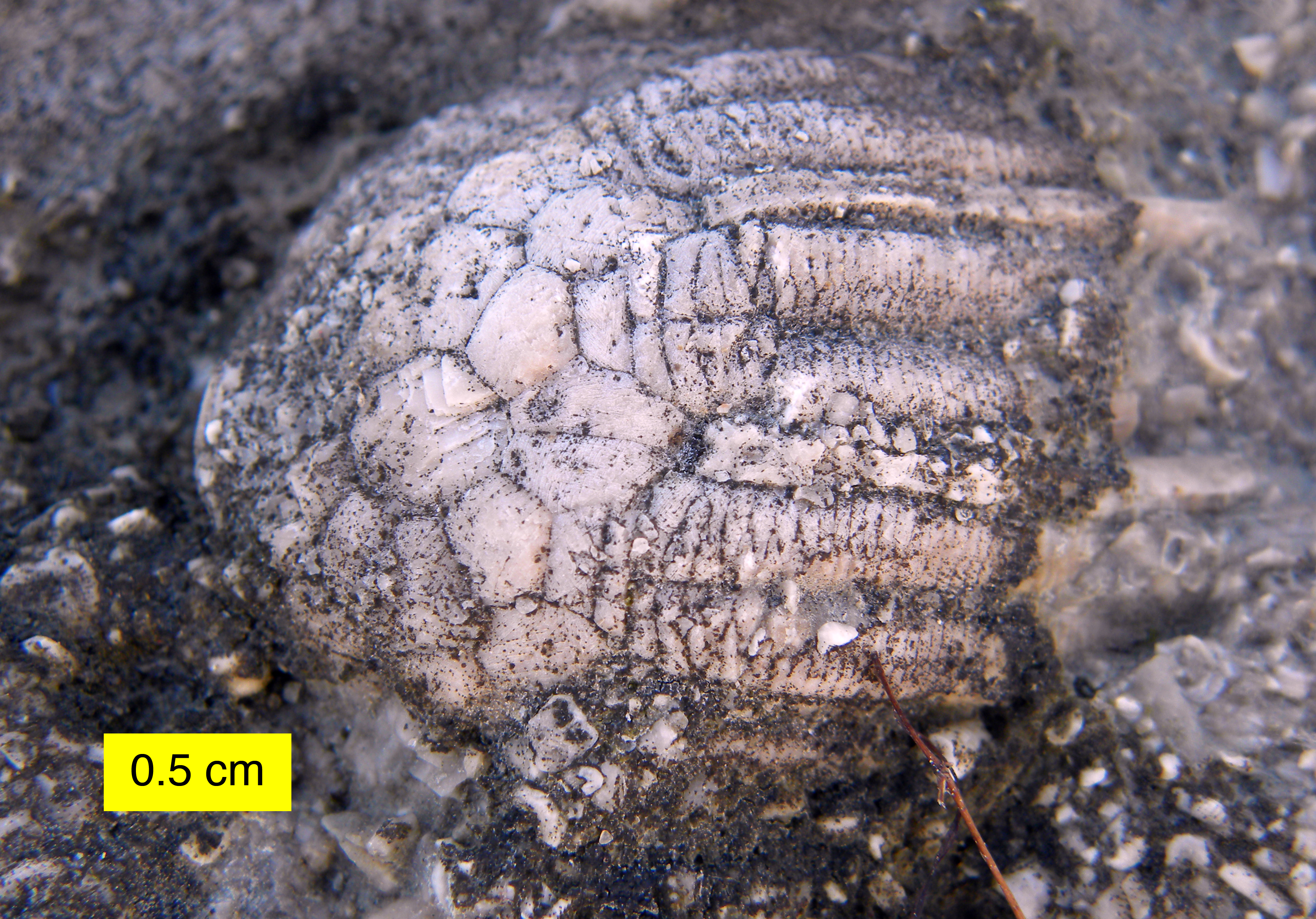
- Fossilized calyx of the Silurian-Middle Devonian crinoid ("sea lily") Eucalyptocrinites
  †Eucalyptocrinites
- †Euchondria
- †Euconospira
  - †Euconospira desereti – or unidentified related form
  - †Euconospira disjuncta
- †Euloxoceras
  - †Euloxoceras angustius – type locality for species
  - †Euloxoceras greenei
- †Eumetria
- †Eumorphoceras
  - †Eumorphoceras bisulcatum
  - †Eumorphoceras milleri – type locality for species
  - †Eumorphoceras ornatissimum – or unidentified comparable form
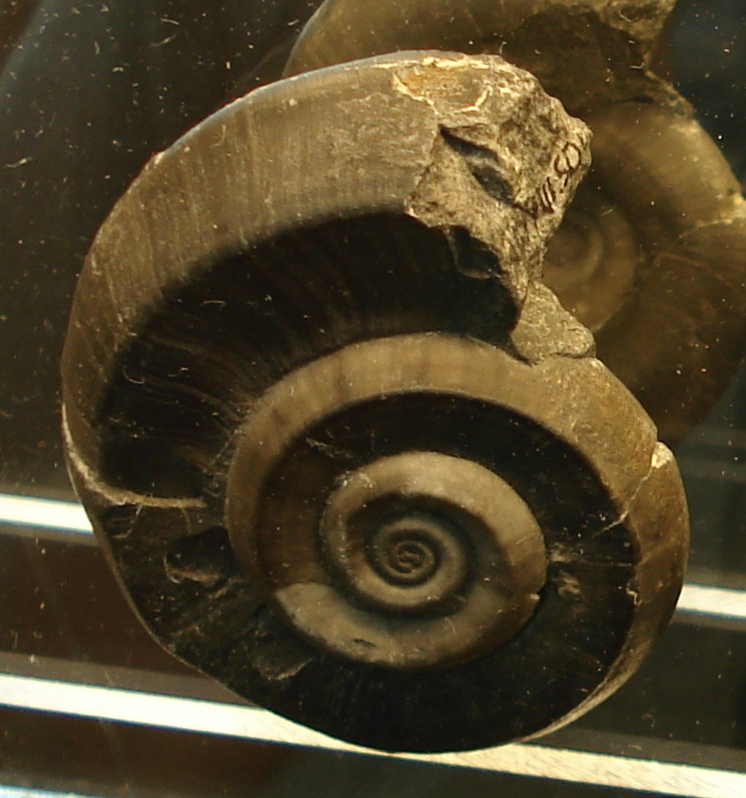
- Fossilized shell of the Silurian-Permian sea snail Euomphalus
  †Euomphalus
  - †Euomphalus konobasis – type locality for species
  - †Euomphalus variabilis – type locality for species
- †Eupachycrinus
  - †Eupachycrinus magister – or unidentified comparable form
- †Euphemites
  - †Euphemites chesterensis – type locality for species
  - †Euphemites whirligigi – type locality for species

== F ==
- †Fayettevillea
  - †Fayettevillea planorbis – type locality for species
- †Florinites
  - †Florinites similis
  - †Florinites volans

== G ==
- †Garwoodia – tentative report
- †Gastrioceras
  - †Gastrioceras adaense
  - †Gastrioceras fittsi
  - †Gastrioceras formosum – type locality for species
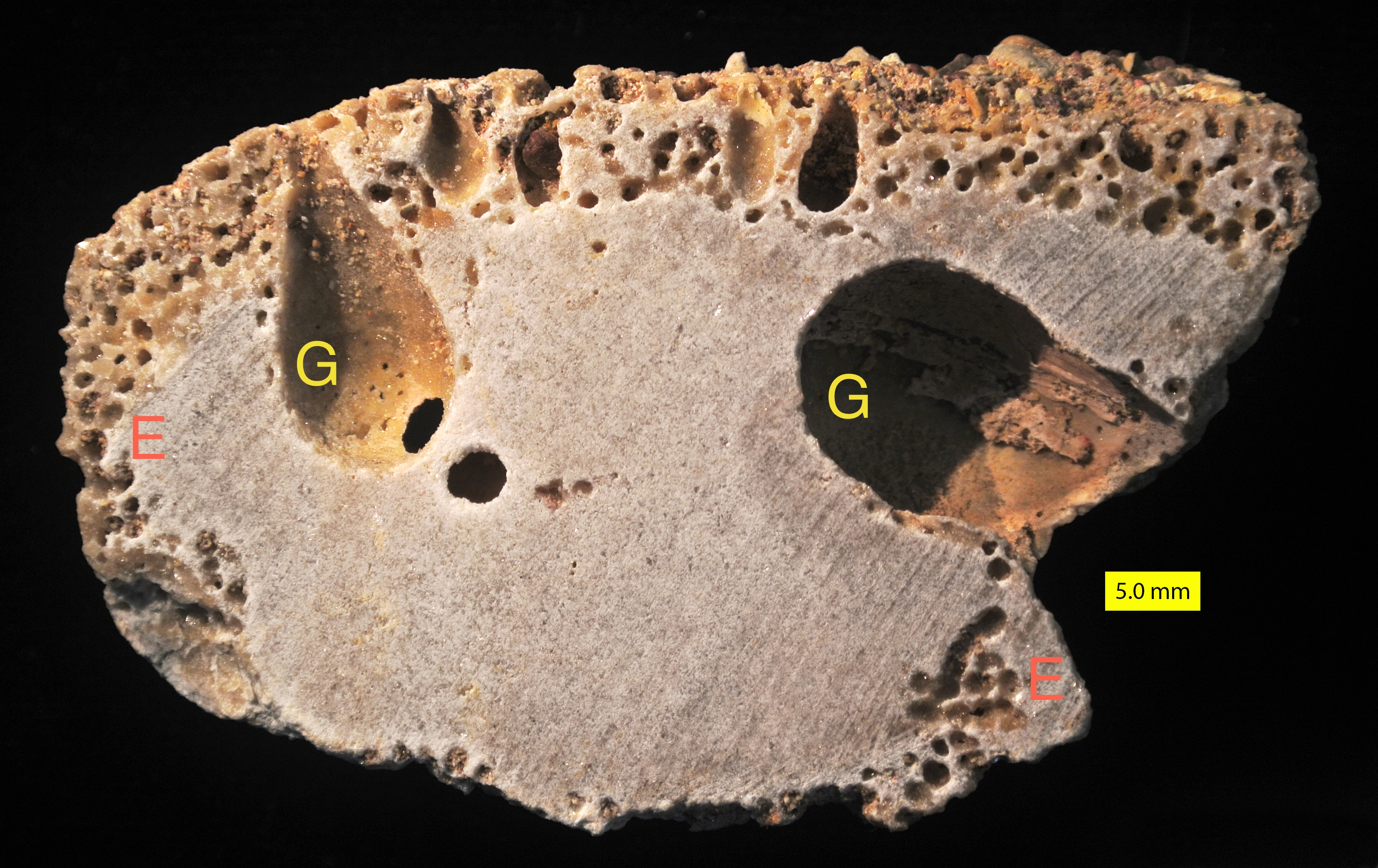
- Fossil of the bore-hole ichnogenus Gastrochaenolites (G)
  Gastrochaenolites
  - †Gastrochaenolites anauchen
- †Gattendorfia
- †Geisina – tentative report
  - †Geisina retiferiformis
- †Girtyoceras
  - †Girtyoceras welleri – type locality for species
- †Girtyspira
  - †Girtyspira microspirula – type locality for species
- †Girvanella
- †Glabrocingulum
  - †Glabrocingulum binodosum
  - †Glabrocingulum coronulum – type locality for species
  - †Glabrocingulum parasolum – type locality for species
  - †Glabrocingulum parvanodum – type locality for species
  - †Glabrocingulum quadrigatum
- †Glaphyrites
  - †Glaphyrites depressus
  - †Glaphyrites fayettevillae – type locality for species
  - †Glaphyrites morrowensis
- †Globozyga
  - †Globozyga mediocris – type locality for species
- †Glyphiolobus
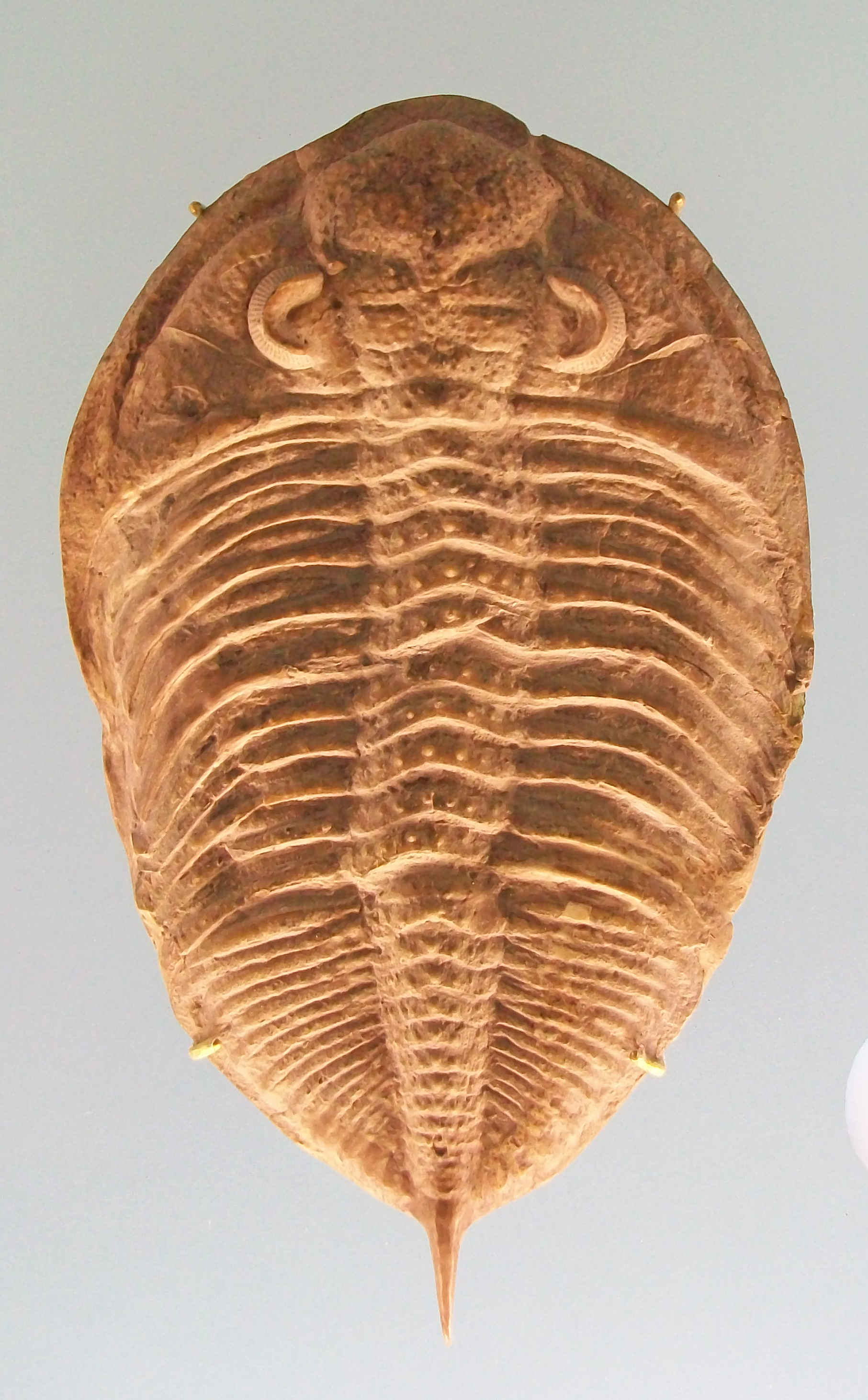
- Fossil of the Silurian trilobite Glyptambon
  †Glyptambon – type locality for genus
  - †Glyptambon verrucosus
- †Glyptopleura
  - †Glyptopleura angulata
  - †Glyptopleura inopinata
- †Gnathodus
  - †Gnathodus texanus
- †Goniatites
  - †Goniatites crenistria – or unidentified related form
  - †Goniatites granosus
  - †Goniatites multiliratus
- †Gordonites
  - †Gordonites filifer
  - †Gordonites matheri
- †Granulatisporites
  - †Granulatisporites adnatoides
- †Graphiadactyllis
  - †Graphiadactyllis arkansana
  - †Graphiadactyllis fayettevillensis

== H ==
- †Haplistion
  - †Haplistion sphaericum
- †Harpidella
  - †Harpidella butorus – type locality for species
  - †Harpidella spinulocervix
- †Healdia
- †Hematites
  - †Hematites barbarae
- †Holocystites
  - †Holocystites alternatus
- †Homoceratoides
  - †Homoceratoides cracens
- †Homoeospirella
  - †Homoeospirella costatula
  - †Homoeospirella pygmaea
- †Hormotoma
  - †Hormotoma anna
  - †Hormotoma artemesia – type locality for species
- †Housia
  - †Housia vacuna
- †Howellella
  - †Howellella splendens
- †Hudsonoceras
  - †Hudsonoceras moorei
- †Hustedia
- †Hydreionocrinus
- †Hypotetragona – tentative report

== I ==
- †Imitoceras
  - †Imitoceras sinuatum – type locality for species
- †Imoella – type locality for genus
  - †Imoella obscura – type locality for species
- †Imogloba
  - †Imogloba gandyensis
- †Imonautilus – type locality for genus
  - †Imonautilus meeki – type locality for species
- †Incisurella
  - †Incisurella prima
- †Inflatia
  - †Inflatia clydensis
- †Irvingella
  - †Irvingella major

== J ==
- †Janthimorpha – report made of unidentified related form or using admittedly obsolete nomenclature
- †Jasperoceras
  - †Jasperoceras costatum

== K ==
- †Kaskia
  - †Kaskia chesterensis
- †Kazakhstania – tentative report
- †Kindbladia
  - †Kindbladia wichitaensis
- †Kinkaidia
  - †Kinkaidia trigonalis
- †Kirkbya
  - †Kirkbya reflexa
- †Kirkbyella
  - †Kirkbyella quadrata
- †Knightoceras
  - †Knightoceras oxylobatum – type locality for species
  - †Knightoceras patulum
- †Knoxisporites
  - †Knoxisporites triradiatus
- †Kozlowskiellina
  - †Kozlowskiellina vaningeni
- †Krotovia

== L ==
- †Laevigatosporites
  - †Laevigatosporites desmoinesensis
  - †Laevigatosporites vulgaris
- †Lasanocrinus
  - †Lasanocrinus strigosus
- †Leangella
  - †Leangella dissiticostella
- †Leonardophyllum
  - †Leonardophyllum arkansanum
- †Lepdioproetus
  - †Lepdioproetus xeo – type locality for species
- †Leptaena
- †Leptagonia
- †Leptocyrtoceras
  - †Leptocyrtoceras curvatum
  - †Leptocyrtoceras powellense
- †Leptodesma
- †Limipecten
- †Lingula
- †Linoproductus
- †Liroceras – tentative report
- †Lissatrypa
  - †Lissatrypa clairensis
- †Lissostrophia
- †Lophamplexus – tentative report
- †Lophophyllidium
  - †Lophophyllidium imoense – type locality for species
- †Lophotriletes
  - †Lophotriletes microsaetosus
- †Lusitanites
  - †Lusitanites subcircularis
- †Lycospora
  - †Lycospora micropapillata
  - †Lycospora pellucida
- †Lygdozoon – type locality for genus
  - †Lygdozoon anoplos – type locality for species
  - †Lygdozoon arkansanum
  - †Lygdozoon collatum – type locality for species
- †Lysocystites – or unidentified related form

== M ==
- †Macropotamorhynchus
  - †Macropotamorhynchus chouteauensis
  - †Macropotamorhynchus tuta
- †Macrostylocrinus
- †Magnumbonella
- †Mammoides
- †Mariceras
- †Marmolatella
  - †Marmolatella imoensis – type locality for species
  - †Marmolatella macgordoni – type locality for species
- †Meekospira
  - †Meekospira minuta
- †Megaglossoceras
  - †Megaglossoceras glicki – type locality for species
- †Megapronorites
  - †Megapronorites baconi
- †Meristina
  - †Meristina clairensis
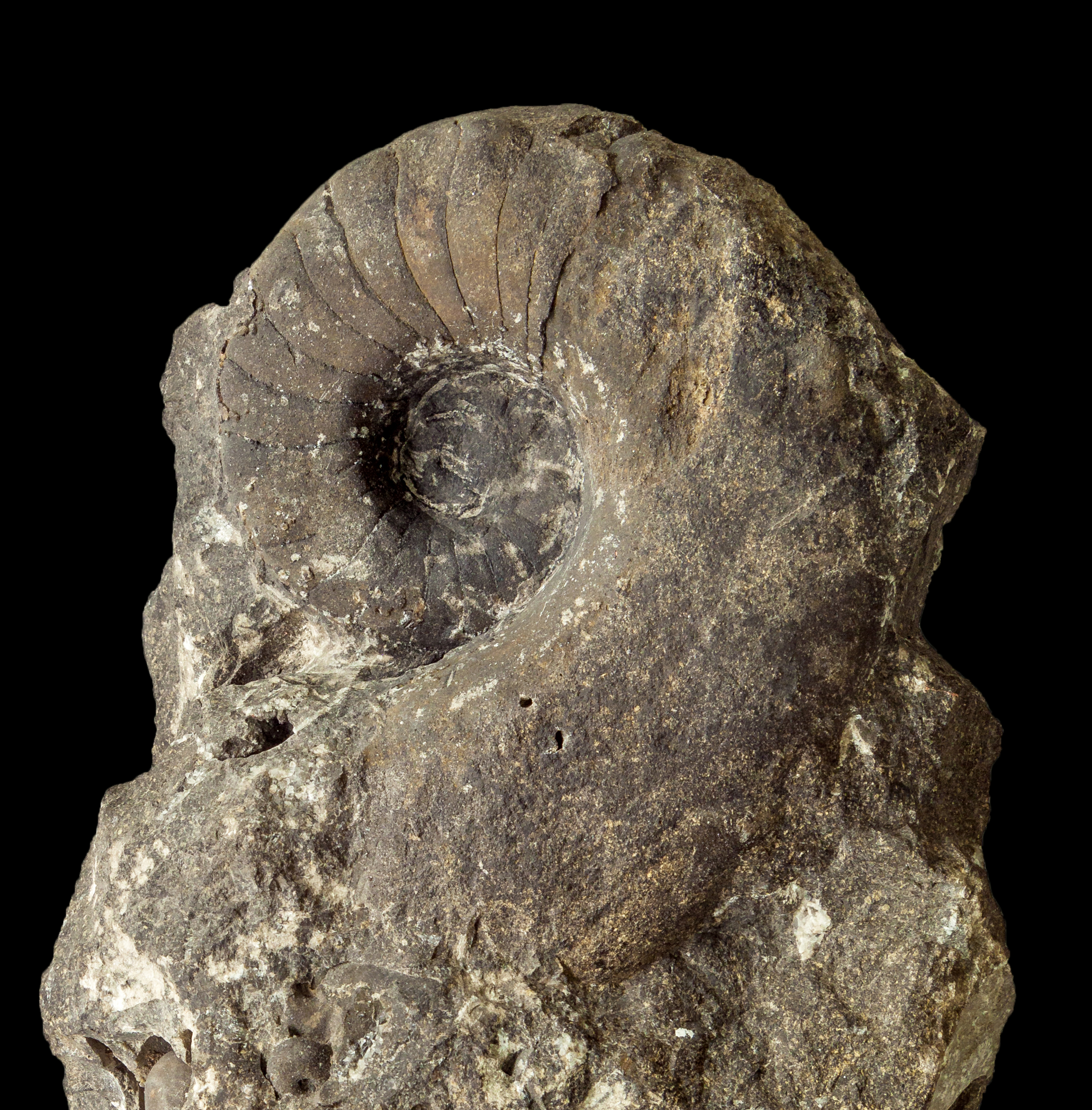
- Fossilized shell of the Carboniferous-Permian nautiloid cephalopod Metacoceras
  †Metacoceras
- †Metacromyocrinus
  - †Metacromyocrinus gillumi
- †Metadimorphoceras
  - †Metadimorphoceras subdivisum
- †Metutharocrinus
  - †Metutharocrinus cockei – type locality for species
- †Michelinia
  - †Michelinia macerimuris – type locality for species
  - †Michelinia meekana
  - †Michelinia tenuicula
- †Michelinoceras
  - †Michelinoceras wapanuckense
- †Microcheilinella – tentative report
- †Mitorthoceras
  - †Mitorthoceras crebriliratum
  - †Mitorthoceras girtyi – type locality for species
  - †Mitorthoceras perfilosum
  - †Mitorthoceras yellvillense – type locality for species
- †Monoceratina
- †Mooreoceras
  - †Mooreoceras wedingtonianum – type locality for species
- †Mourlonia
  - †Mourlonia lativittata
- †Muensteroceras
  - †Muensteroceras arkansanum – type locality for species
  - †Muensteroceras collinsoni – type locality for species
  - †Muensteroceras pisiforme – type locality for species
- †Multithecopora
- †Myalina
  - †Myalina parallela – or unidentified comparable form

== N ==
- †Naiadites – tentative report
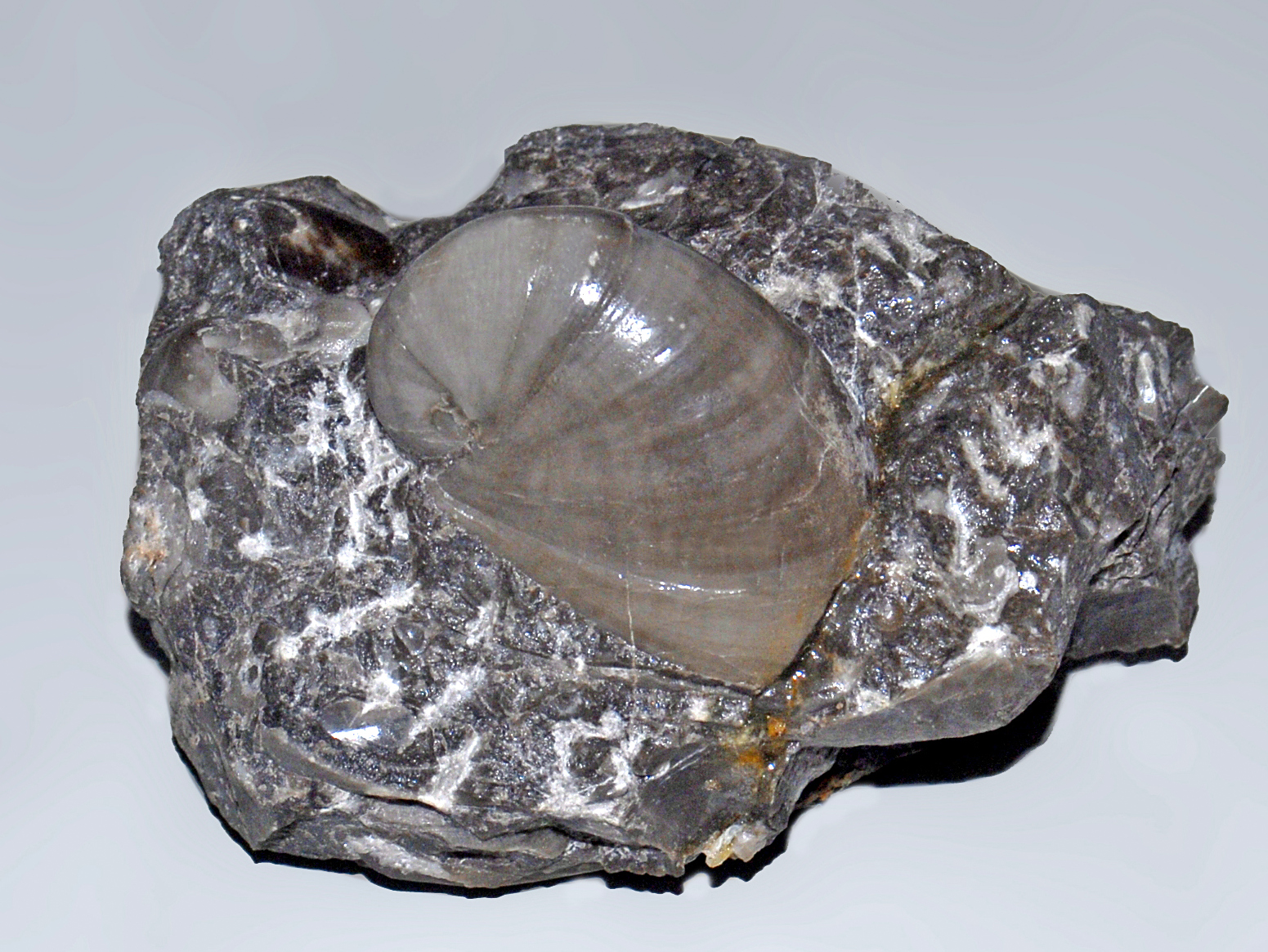
- Fossilized shell of the Early Devonian – Triassic sea snail Naticopsis
  †Naticopsis
  - †Naticopsis clinovata – or unidentified comparable form
  - †Naticopsis genevievensis
- †Neochonetes
- †Neoglyphioceras
  - †Neoglyphioceras caneyanum
  - †Neoglyphioceras crebriliratum
- †Nostocites
- †Nucleospira
  - †Nucleospira raritas
- †Nuculavus
  - †Nuculavus okawensis
- †Nuculopsis
  - †Nuculopsis shumardana

== O ==
- †Ogygoceras
  - †Ogygoceras gracile
- †Onychotreta
  - †Onychotreta lenta
  - †Onychotreta mesleri
  - †Onychotreta miseri
  - †Onychotreta multiplicata
  - †Onychotreta plicata
- †Orbiculoidea
- †Orospira
  - †Orospira elegantula
- †Orthobairdia
  - †Orthobairdia cestriensis
- †Orthonychia
  - †Orthonychia compressum
  - †Orthonychia ungula
- †Orthostrophella
  - †Orthostrophella clairensis
- †Orthotetes
- †Ortonella – tentative report
  - †Ortonella kershopensis
- †Ovatia
- †Oxoplecia
  - †Oxoplecia infrequens
- †Ozarcus – type locality for genus
  - †Ozarcus mapesae – type locality for species

== P ==
- †Pachylyroceras
  - †Pachylyroceras cloudi
  - †Pachylyroceras newsomi
- †Paladin
  - †Paladin mucronatus
- †Palaeacis
  - †Palaeacis carinata
- †Palaeocapulus
  - †Palaeocapulus undata
- †Palaeoneilo
  - †Palaeoneilo sera
- †Paleoconus
  - †Paleoconus bakeri – type locality for species
- †Paleyoldia
  - †Paleyoldia angustia – type locality for species
  - †Paleyoldia bruta – type locality for species
- †Palmerocrinus
  - †Palmerocrinus kesslerensis – type locality for species
- †Paracravenoceras
  - †Paracravenoceras ozarkense – type locality for species
- †Paracromyocrinus
  - †Paracromyocrinus oklahomensis
- †Paradimorphoceras
- †Paralegoceras
  - †Paralegoceras iowense
  - †Paralegoceras texanum
- †Parallelodon
  - †Parallelodon cancellosus – or unidentified comparable form
- †Paramphicrinus
  - †Paramphicrinus magnus – type locality for species
- †Paraparchites – tentative report
  - †Paraparchites cyclopeus
- †Parastrophinella
  - †Parastrophinella lepida
- †Parvaxon
  - †Parvaxon minutum
- †Patellilabia
  - †Patellilabia laevigata
  - †Patellilabia rhombadella – type locality for species
  - †Patellilabia sulcata – type locality for species
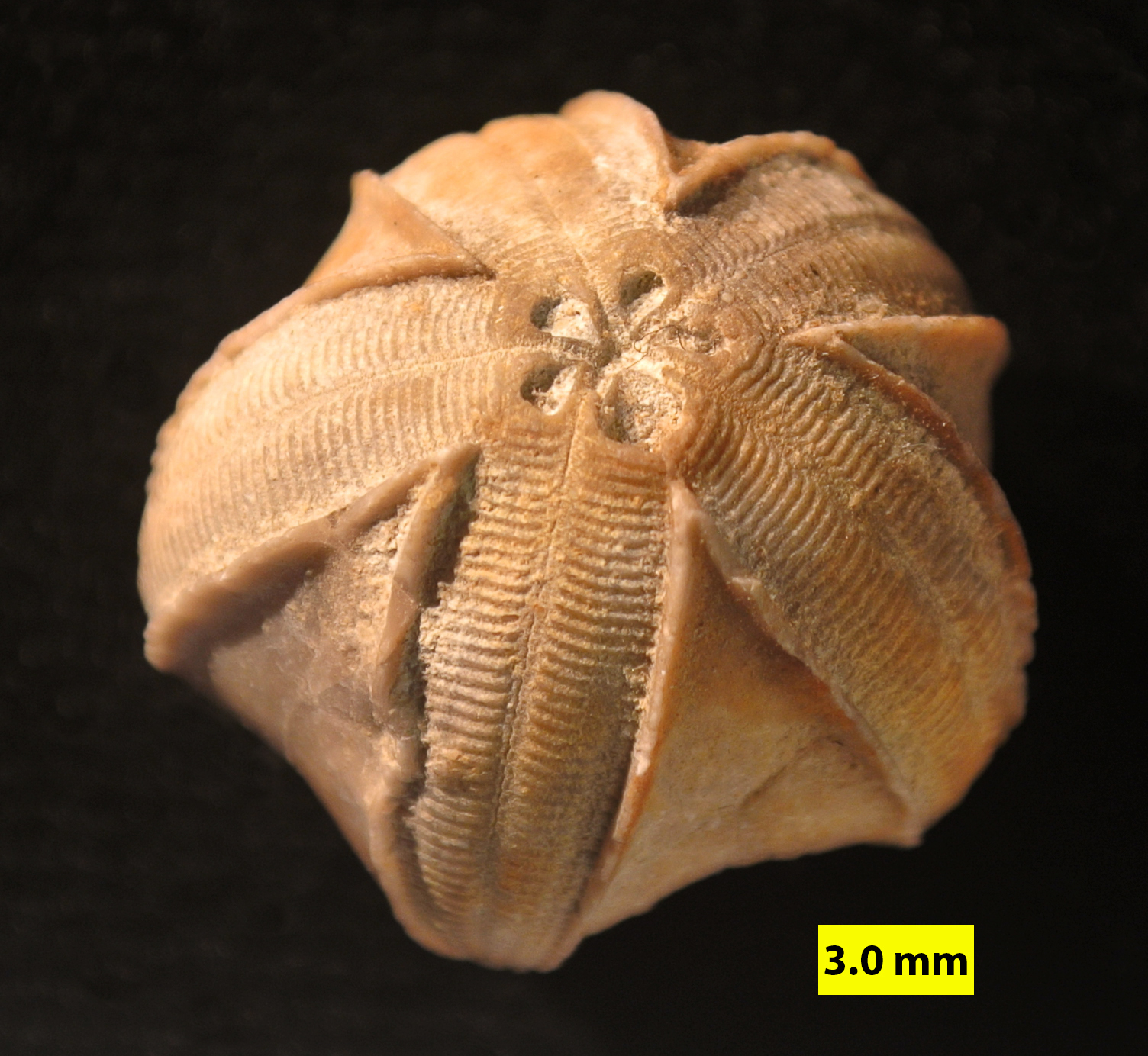
- Fossilized theca of the Carboniferous blastoid echinoderm ("sea bud") Pentremites
  †Pentremites
- †Pericyclus
- †Perigrammoceras
- †Perimestocrinus
  - †Perimestocrinus teneris
- †Peripetoceras
  - †Peripetoceras ozarkense – type locality for species
- †Permophorus
- †Phaneroceras
  - †Phaneroceras compressum
  - †Phaneroceras kesslerense – type locality for species
- †Pharkidonotus
- †Phestia
  - †Phestia corrugata – type locality for species
  - †Phestia obtusa – type locality for species
  - †Phestia wortheni – type locality for species
- †Phricodothyris
- †Pilosisporites
  - †Pilosisporites williamsii
- †Pionoceras
  - †Pionoceras smithvillense
- †Placotriplesia
  - †Placotriplesia juvenis
  - †Placotriplesia praecipta
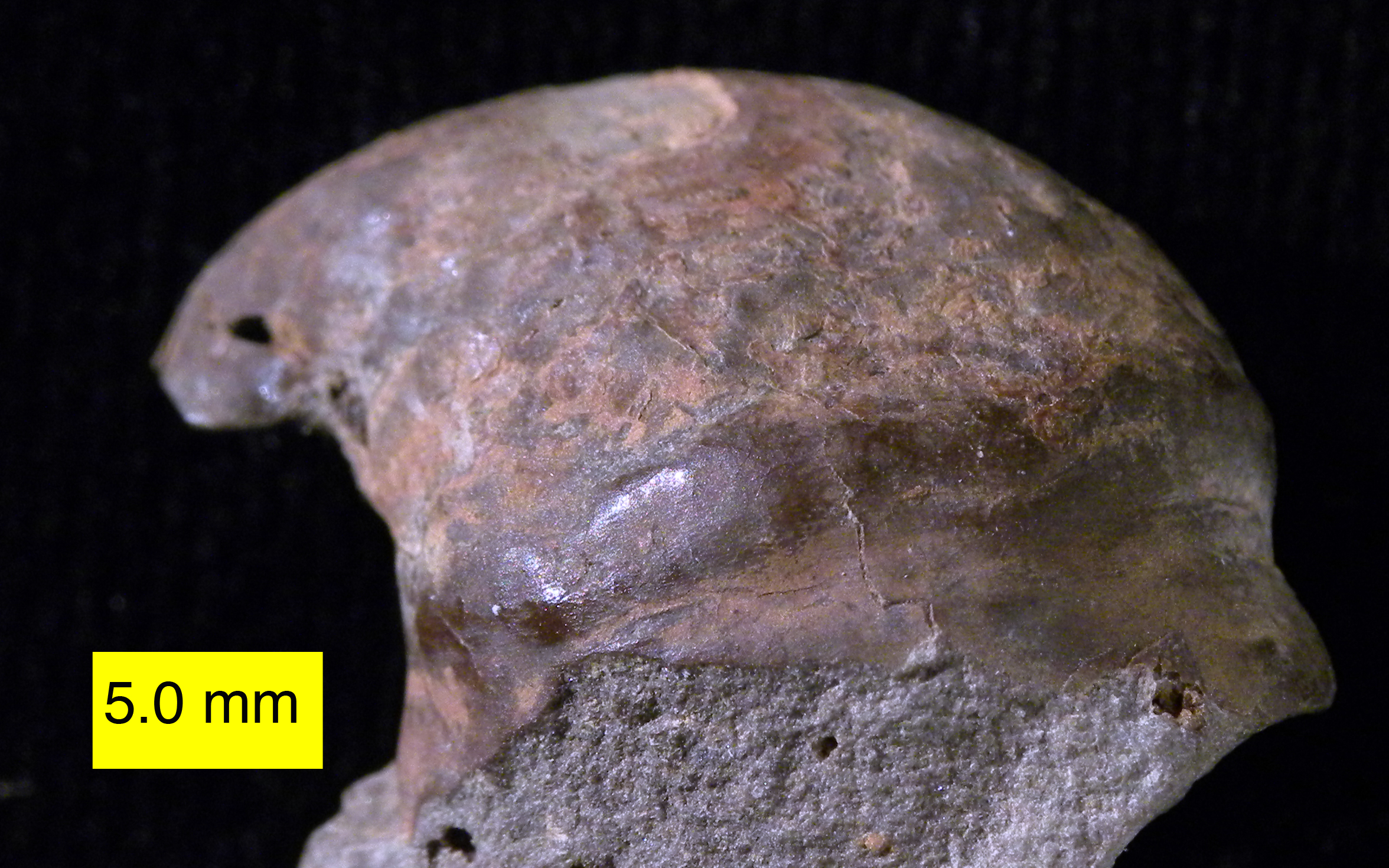
- Fossilized shell of the Silurian-Early Triassic sea snail Platyceras
  †Platyceras
  - †Platyceras latum
  - †Platyceras oxynotum – type locality for species
- †Plectatrypa
  - †Plectatrypa arctoimbricata
- †Plectodonta – tentative report
- †Plicochonetes
- †Plicocyrtia
  - †Plicocyrtia arkansana
- †Polidevcia
  - †Polidevcia stevensiana
- †Posidonia
  - †Posidonia nasuta
- †Productina
  - †Productina sampsoni
- †Productus
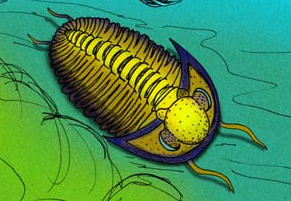
- Restoration of the Silurian trilobite Proetus
  †Proetus
  - †Proetus vaningeni
- †Prolecanites
  - †Prolecanites lyoni – or unidentified comparable form
- †Proshumardites
  - †Proshumardites morrowanus
- †Prospira
  - †Prospira latior
- †Prothyris
  - †Prothyris crista – type locality for species
  - †Prothyris soleniformis – or unidentified comparable form
- †Protocycloceras
  - †Protocycloceras arkansaense
  - †Protocycloceras smithvillense
- †Pseudagnostus
  - †Pseudagnostus communis
- †Pseudokingstonia
  - †Pseudokingstonia exotica
- †Pseudopronorites
  - †Pseudopronorites arkansiensis
  - †Pseudopronorites quinni
- †Pseudorthoceras
  - †Pseudorthoceras knoxense
  - †Pseudorthoceras stonense – type locality for species
- †Pseudozygopleura
- †Pterocephalia
  - †Pterocephalia sanctisabae
- †Ptychomphalina
  - †Ptychomphalina magna – type locality for species
- †Punctospirifer
- †Pycnoceras
  - †Pycnoceras clausum
- †Pygmaeoceras
  - †Pygmaeoceras solidum

== Q ==
- †Quinnites
  - †Quinnites henbesti
  - †Quinnites textum

== R ==
- †Radnoria
- †Ramosites
- †Raphiophorus
  - †Raphiophorus niagarensis
- †Rayonnoceras
  - †Rayonnoceras eccentricum – type locality for species
  - †Rayonnoceras fayettevillense
  - †Rayonnoceras irregulare – or unidentified comparable form
  - †Rayonnoceras nobile – or unidentified comparable form
  - †Rayonnoceras protentum – type locality for species
  - †Rayonnoceras solidiforme
  - †Rayonnoceras vaughanianum
- †Rectangulina
- †Resserella
- †Reticulariina
- †Reticuloceras
  - †Reticuloceras tiro
  - †Reticuloceras wainwright
  - †Reticuloceras wainwrighti
- †Reticycloceras
  - †Reticycloceras croneisi – type locality for species
  - †Reticycloceras girtyi – type locality for species
  - †Reticycloceras peytonense – type locality for species
  - †Reticycloceras sequoyahense
- †Retispira
  - †Retispira cincta
  - †Retispira ordinata – or unidentified related form
  - †Retispira yochelsoni – type locality for species
- †Retites
  - †Retites semiretia
- †Reviya
  - †Reviya planus – or unidentified related form
- †Rhipidomella
- †Rhynchopora
- †Rhytiophora
  - †Rhytiophora blairi
- †Richardsonites
  - †Richardsonites richardsonianum
  - †Richardsonites richardsonianus
- †Roundyella
  - †Roundyella simplex

== S ==
- †Sandia
- †Sanguinolites
  - †Sanguinolites simulans – tentative report
- †Sansabella
  - †Sansabella fayettevillensis
  - †Sansabella reticulata
- †Savitrisporites
  - †Savitrisporites nux
- †Schartymites
  - †Schartymites paynei
- †Schellwienella
- †Schizodus
  - †Schizodus chesterensis
- †Schizophoria
- †Schuchertella
- †Schulzospora
  - †Schulzospora rara
- †Schumardella
  - †Schumardella obsolecens
- †Sedenticellula
- †Sedgwickia
- †Seminolites
- †Septatrypa
  - †Septatrypa havliceki
- †Septimyalina
  - †Septimyalina perattenuata – or unidentified comparable form
- †Serenida
  - †Serenida seminalis
- †Shaleria
- †Solenochilus
  - †Solenochilus floweri – type locality for species
  - †Solenochilus peculiare – or unidentified comparable form
- †Solenomorpha
  - †Solenomorpha nitida
- †Spathelopsis – type locality for genus
  - †Spathelopsis browni – type locality for species
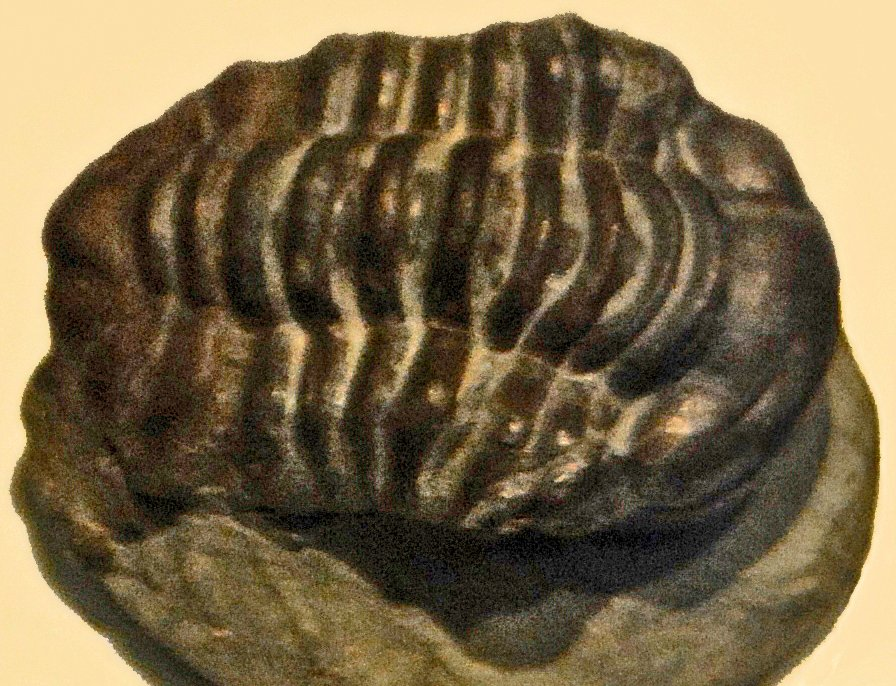
- Fossil of the Middle Ordovician-Silurian trilobite Sphaerexochus
  †Sphaerexochus
  - †Sphaerexochus glaber – type locality for species
- †Sphenotus
  - †Sphenotus branneri
  - †Sphenotus dubius
  - †Sphenotus meslerianus
  - †Sphenotus pisinnus – type locality for species
  - †Sphenotus washingtonensis
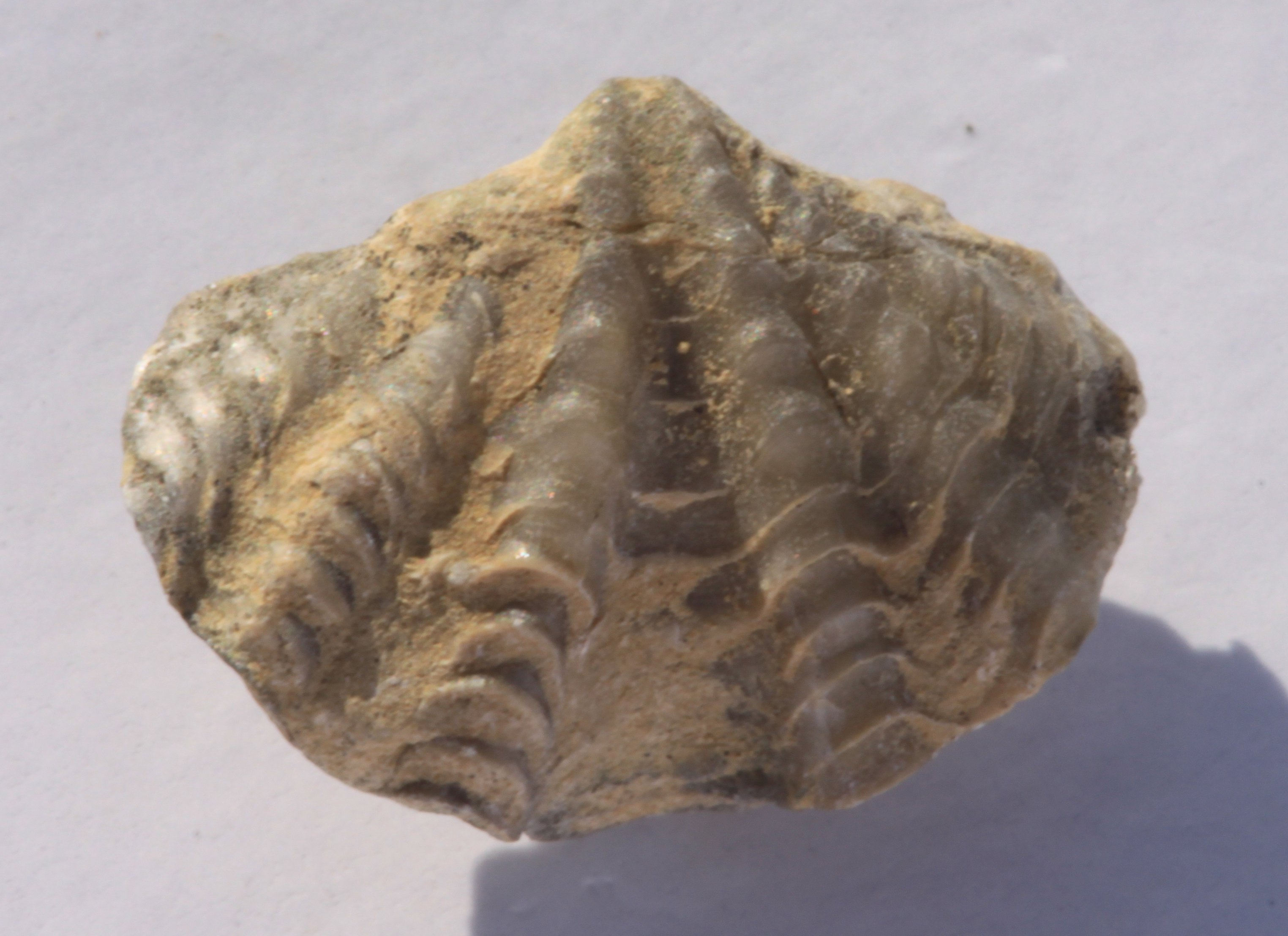
- Fossilized shell of the Late Ordovician-Late Triassic brachiopod Spirifer
  †Spirifer
- †Spiriferellina
- †Staurocephalus
  - †Staurocephalus lagena – type locality for species
  - †Staurocephalus oarion – type locality for species
- †Stearoceras
  - †Stearoceras gibbosum – or unidentified related form
  - †Stearoceras smithi – type locality for species
- †Stenoglaphyrites
  - †Stenoglaphyrites involutus – type locality for species
  - †Stenoglaphyrites miseri – type locality for species
- †Stenopronorites
- †Sthenarocalymene
  - †Sthenarocalymene scutula – type locality for species
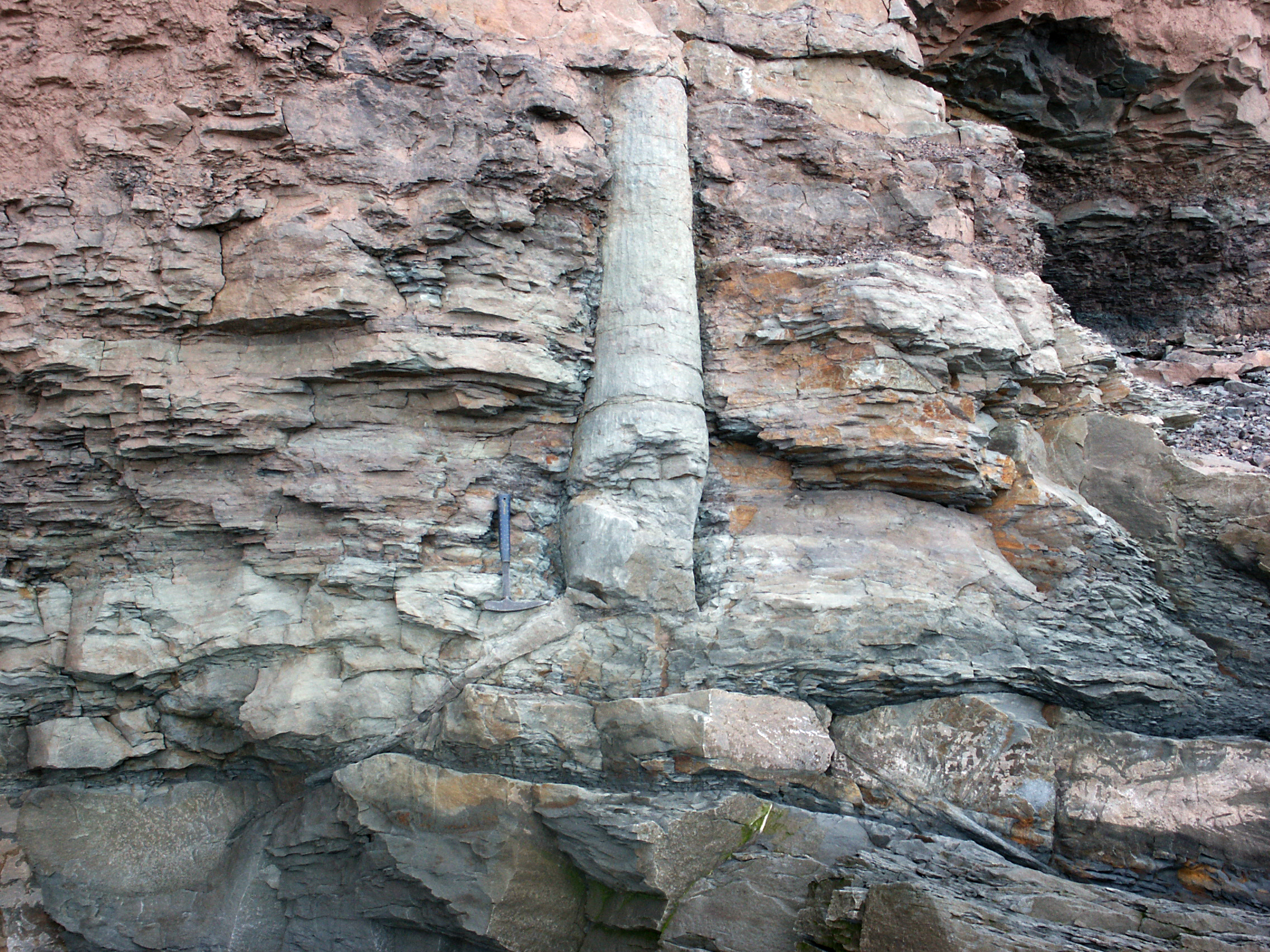
- Fossil preserved in situ of a Carboniferous tree-like club moss relative with attached Stigmaria rhizome system
  †Stigmaria
  - †Stigmaria wedingtonensis
- †Stioderma
  - †Stioderma hadra – type locality for species
- †Streptis
  - †Streptis glomerata
- †Streptorhynchus
- †Strobeus
- †Stroboceras
  - †Stroboceras gordoni – type locality for species
  - †Stroboceras sulcatum – or unidentified comparable form
- †Sudeticeras
- †Sulcella
- †Sulcogirtyoceras
  - †Sulcogirtyoceras jasperense – type locality for species
  - †Sulcogirtyoceras limatum
- †Sutherlandia
- †Syngastrioceras
  - †Syngastrioceras globosum
  - †Syngastrioceras oblatum
  - †Syngastrioceras scotti
- †Syntrophopsis
  - †Syntrophopsis grandis – type locality for species

== T ==
- †Tectamichelina – type locality for genus
  - †Tectamichelina mangeri – type locality for species
- †Teiichispira
  - †Teiichispira odenvillensis
- †Tesuquea
- †Tetracamera
- †Tetratylis – tentative report
- †Tetratylus – tentative report
- †Torynifer
- †Trepspira
  - †Trepspira tentative report type locality for species – informal
- †Triboloceras – tentative report
- †Tripteroceroides – tentative report
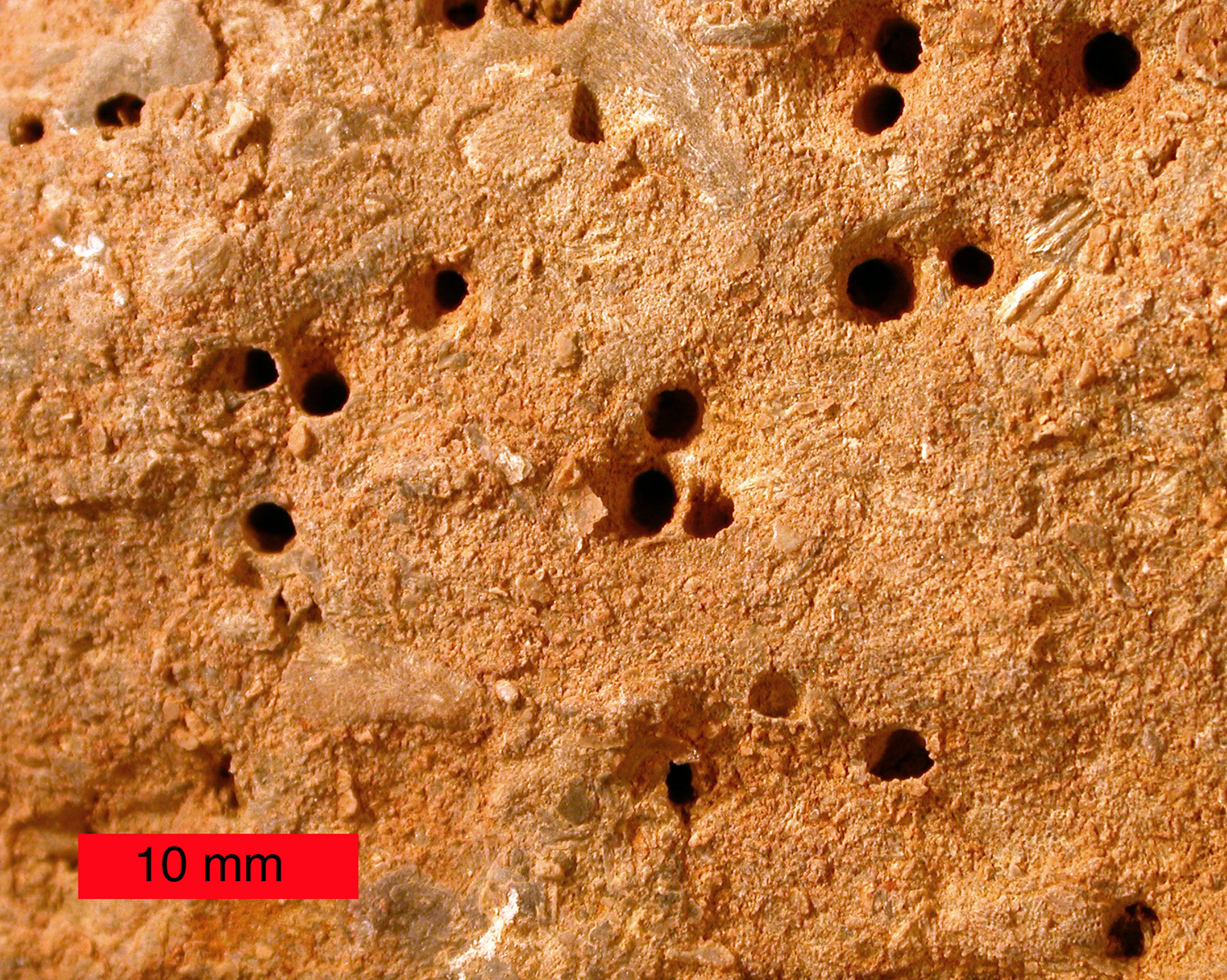
- Fossils of the bore-hole ichnogenus Trypanites
  Trypanites
- †Tylonautilus
  - †Tylonautilus gratiosus

== U ==
- †Utharocrinus
  - †Utharocrinus pentanodus

== V ==
- †Valhallites
  - †Valhallites ornatus – type locality for species
  - †Valhallites tuberculatus – type locality for species
  - †Valhallites westforkensis – type locality for species
- †Verneuilites
  - †Verneuilites pygmaeus
- †Virgaspongia – type locality for genus
  - †Virgaspongia ichnata – type locality for species
- †Virginiata
  - †Virginiata arkansana
- †Voiseyella
- †Vorticina
  - †Vorticina venata

== W ==
- †Wichitoceras
  - †Wichitoceras compressum
- †Wiedeyoceras
  - †Wiedeyoceras williamsi – type locality for species
- †Wilkingia
  - †Wilkingia inflata – or unidentified comparable form
- †Winslowoceras
  - †Winslowoceras henbesti – type locality for species

== X ==
- †Xenocheilos
  - †Xenocheilos minutum

== Y ==
- †Yochelsonospira
  - †Yochelsonospira tenuilineata

== Z ==
- †Zaphrentites
  - †Zaphrentites arkansanus
- †Zia
- †Zygopleura – report made of unidentified related form or using admittedly obsolete nomenclature
