= Campyloceras =

Campyloceras Temporal range: Visean

Scientific classification
- Kingdom: Animalia
- Phylum: Mollusca
- Class: Cephalopoda
- Order: †Pseudorthocerida
- Family: †Pseudactinoceratidae
- Genus: †Campyloceras; McCoy, 1844

Extinct genus of molluscs

Campyloceras is a genus of Lower Carboniferous cephalopod belonging to the order Pseudorthocerida. The species has an elongate, moderately curved, shell. Curvature is greatest toward the apex and lessens in the adult portion. The siphuncle is central to subcentral with moderately to strongly inflated segments. Cameral deposits are well developed on the convex side, toward the apex while only thin on the concave side, making the curvature exogastric.

Named by McCloy in 1844, the genus is related to Pseudactinoceras. Both are included in the Pseudactinoceratidae.
