= Dolorthoceras =

Dolorthoceras Temporal range: Early Devonian - Early Permian

Scientific classification
- Kingdom: Animalia
- Phylum: Mollusca
- Class: Cephalopoda
- Order: †Pseudorthocerida
- Family: †Spyroceratidae
- Genus: †Dolorthoceras; Miller, 1931

Extinct genus of nautiloids

Dolorthoceras is a nautiloid cephalopod from the upper Paleozoic found in Lower Devonian to Lower Permian strata in North America, Europe, Asia, and Australia.

The shell is a smooth, gently expanding orthocone with straight transverse to oblique and slightly sinuous sutures. Some are dorso-ventrally flattened so as to be slightly depressed. The hyponomic sinus, through which the funnel projects, appears to be trilobate. The siphuncle begins orthochoanitic (segments straight tubular) and central, becoming cyrtochoanitic (segments inflated) and subcentral with growth. Endosiphuncular deposits tend to grow forward, normally completed annularly at the septal foramina (openings) before fusing ventrally. Cameral deposits are mural, and heavier ventrally and dorsally.

Dolorthoceras is recognized as a pseudorthocerid, nautiloid cephalopods that resemble but are not true orthocerids. It is assigned to the family Spyroceratidae along with such genera as Spyroceras, Adnatoceras, and Euloxoceras.

Orientation during life was horizontal, as indicated by the cameral and endosiphuncular deposits. The animal may have been somewhat squid-like morphologically, but its behavior was probably not at all squid-like. It was most likely an ambush predator lying in wait here and there on the shallow sea bottom.
