= Carbactinoceras =

Carbactinoceras Temporal range: Early Carboniferous

Scientific classification
- Kingdom: Animalia
- Phylum: Mollusca
- Class: Cephalopoda
- Order: †Pseudorthocerida
- Family: †Carbactinoceratidae
- Genus: †Carbactinoceras; Schindewolf, 1935

Extinct genus of cephalopods

Carbactinoceras is a genus of Early Carboniferous (Visean) actincoceroids first found in Europe (Germany) related to Rayonnoceras but probably smaller.

== Description ==
Carbactinoceras shells are straight and generally unknown beyond the early growth stage. The siphuncle is large, central to subcentral; segments inflated, septal necks cyrochoantiic and recumbent. The endosiphuncular canal system observed is well developed with thin radial canals perpendicular to the central canal, and leading to a narrow seam along the connecting rings called a perispatium.

== Taxonomic position ==
Although Carbactinoceras had been considered an actinocerid according to the American Teatise Part K, 1964, based on the internal characters of the siphuncle, the initial chambers of the phragmocone indicate that this genus is an actinoceroid homeomorph (lookalike) belonging phylogenetically to the Pseudorthocerida
