= Spyroceras =

Spyroceras Temporal range: Devonian

Scientific classification
- Kingdom: Animalia
- Phylum: Mollusca
- Class: Cephalopoda
- Order: †Pseudorthocerida
- Family: †Spyroceratidae
- Genus: †Spyroceras; Hyatt, 1884

Genus of molluscs

Spyroceras is a genus of pseudorthocerids from the Devonian of North America and Europe, defined by Alpheus Hyatt in 1884. Pseudorthocerids are a kind of orthocertaoid, a taxonomic group within the Nautiloidea. Specifically Spyroceras belongs to the pseudorthocerid family, Spyroceratidae.

Spyroceras had annulated orthocones with straight transverse sutures, transverse or slightly oblique surface annulations, and faintly cyrtoconic apices. Surface ornamentation varies but longitudinal lirae are conspicuous from earliest stage. The siphuncle was central or slightly offset ventrally, and composed of expanded segments typical of the Pseudorthocerida. Cameral and siphonal deposits developed later than in most pseudorthocerids and are thus confined to the apical portion of the phragmocone.
