= Aldanites =

Aldanites Temporal range: L Penn (Morrowan)

Scientific classification
- Kingdom: Animalia
- Phylum: Mollusca
- Class: Cephalopoda
- Subclass: †Ammonoidea
- Order: †Goniatitida
- Family: †Orulganitidae
- Genus: †Aldanites; Ruzhencev 1965

Genus of molluscs (fossil)

Aldanites is an extinct cephalopod genus belonging to the ammonoid order Goniatitida.

Aldanites, named by Ruzhencev, 1965, is confined to the Lower Pennsylvanian Period (late Carboniferous) and is included in the Orulganitidae, a family in the Schistoceratacea, a goniatitid superfamily.
