= Tripteroceroides =

Tripteroceroides Temporal range: L Carb (Mississippian)

Scientific classification
- Kingdom: Animalia
- Phylum: Mollusca
- Class: Cephalopoda
- Order: †Pseudorthocerida
- Family: †Spyroceratidae
- Genus: †Tripteroceroides; Miller and Furnish 1940

Extinct genus of nautiloids

Tripteroceroides is a pseudorthocerid from the Lower Carboniferous (Mississippian) belonging to the family Spyroceratidae . Pseudorthocerids are nautiloid cephalopods with expanded siphuncle segments included in the superorder Orthoceratoidea.

Tripteroceroides has a depressed, apically curved, straight shell with the under side (the venter) flatter than the upper (the dorsum). Sutures have slight lobes (to a rear inflections) as they cross the upper and lower sides, and saddles (diversions to the front) on either flank. The suture is subventral (near the lower side), with flared out necks and subcylindrical segments, sharply reduced in diameter at either end.
