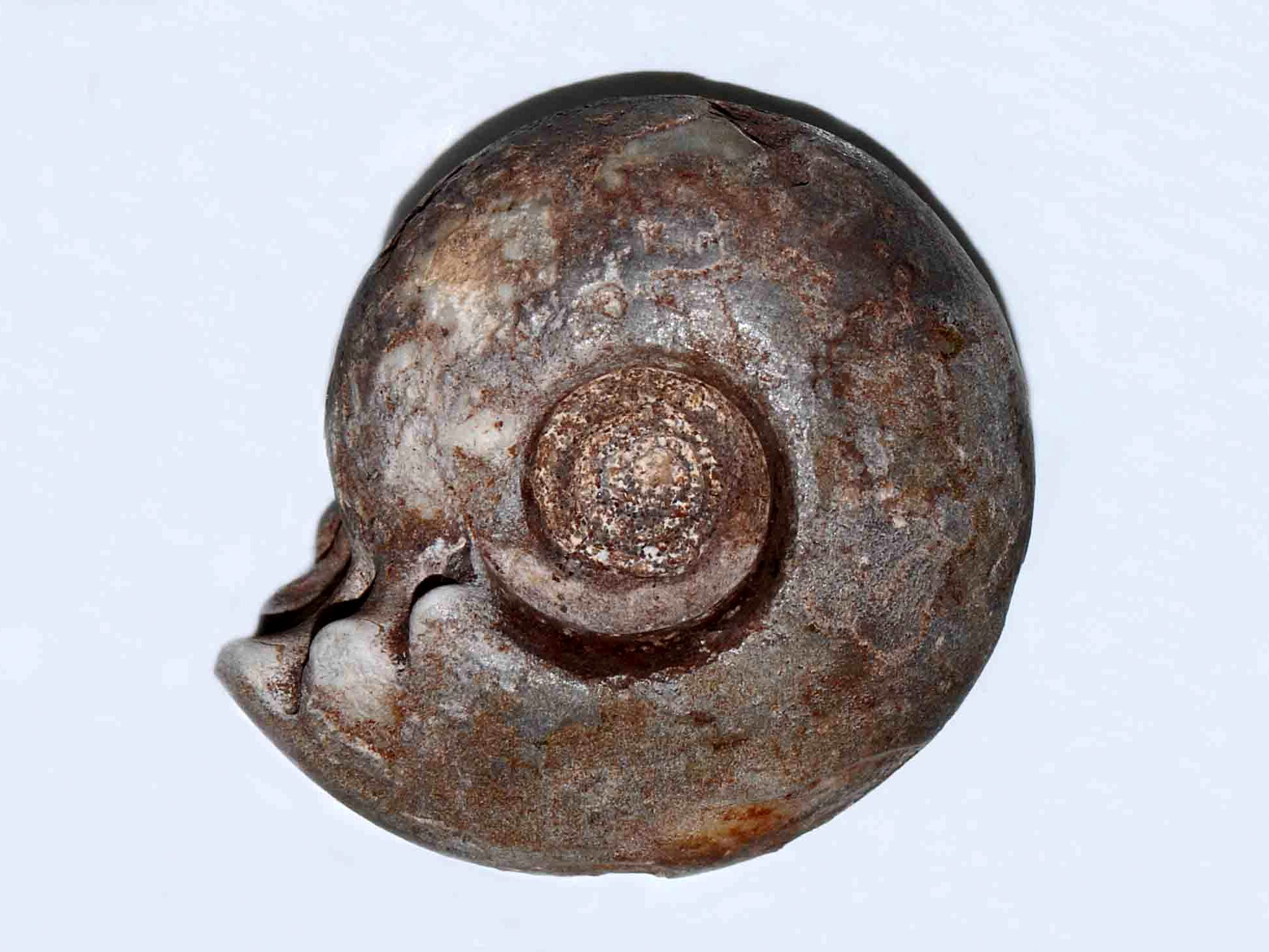

Scientific classification
- Kingdom: Animalia
- Phylum: Mollusca
- Class: Cephalopoda
- Subclass: †Ammonoidea
- Order: †Goniatitida
- Family: †Metalegoceratidae
- Genus: †Metalegoceras
- Species: †M. sundaicum

Binomial name
- †Metalegoceras sundaicum Haniel, 1915

Synonyms
- Paralegoceras sundaicum

= Metalegoceras sundaicum =

Metalegoceras sundaicum Temporal range: Permian, 295–265 Ma

Extinct species of mollusc

Metalegoceras sundaicum is an extinct species of marine invertebrate animals belonging to the family Schistoceratidae.

== Description ==
Shells of this cephalopod have 13 external and internal lobes and saddles.

== Distribution ==
Shells of this species can be found in the Permian of East Timor and Indonesia.
