= Welleritidae =

Scientific classification
- Kingdom: Animalia
- Phylum: Mollusca
- Class: Cephalopoda
- Subclass: †Ammonoidea
- Order: †Goniatitida
- Superfamily: †Schistoceratoidea
- Family: †Welleritidae; Schmidt 1929

Genera
- Aqishanoceras; Axinolobus; Eowellerites; Faqingoceras; Paraphaneroceras; Wellerites; Winslowoceras

Extinct family of molluscs

Welleritidae is one of five families of the Schistoceratoidea superfamily. They are an extinct group of ammonoids, which are shelled cephalopods related to squids, belemnites, octopuses, and cuttlefish, and more distantly to the nautiloids.

Approximate timeline of Welleritidae genera.

== Subfamilies ==
- Axinolobinae
  - Axinolobus
  - Paraphaneroceras
- Welleritinae
  - Aqishanoceras
  - Eowellerites
  - Faqingoceras
  - Wellerites
  - Winslowoceras
