= Macroloxoceras =

Macroloxoceras Temporal range: Upper Devonian

Scientific classification
- Kingdom: Animalia
- Phylum: Mollusca
- Class: Cephalopoda
- Order: †Pseudorthocerida
- Family: †Pseudactinoceratidae
- Genus: †Macroloxoceras; Rousseau H. Flower (1957)

Genus of nautiloids

Macroloxoceras is a large pseuorthocerid from the upper Devonian of Central Colorado and Southern New Mexico with features resembling those found in actinocerids. Pseudorthocerids and actinocerids (respectively Pseuorthocerida and Actinocerida) are extinct nautiloid cephalopods, generally with long straight shells and expanded siphuncle segments filled with organic deposits.

== Morphologic description ==
Macroloxoceras has an orthoconic shell with a strongly depressed cross section and markedly flattened venter. Sutures have broad ventral lobes but are otherwise straight and transverse. The siphuncle is ventral of the center; composed of broadly expanded segments with a spheroidal outline. Septal necks are cytochoantic. Connecting rings are thin and make contact over a wide area on the previous septa at their adapical ends. Endosiphuncular deposits are fairly ubiquitous, begin at the septal openings and grow mostly forward to connect with the next in the anterior part of the following segment. Cavities left in the segments are connected to the rings by two series of radial canals; one at the anterior end of the segment near the end of the septal neck; the other starting in the middle, curving back and ending about where the connecting rings makes contact with the previous septum. Cameral deposits are well developed.

== Taxonomy ==
Macroloxoceras, named and described by Rousseau H. Flower in 1957, is included in the Pseudorthocerid family Pseudactinoceratidae and is placed in the subfamily Macroloxoceratinae, named by him for this genus. Flower in 1957 designated the Pseuorthoceratidae as a family in the Michelinoceratida, more commonly known as the Orthocerida.

Two species have been identified, the genotype Macroloxoceras magnum from the Upper Devonian Chaffe Limestone near Glenwood Springs, Colorado and Macroloxoceras minor from the upper 20 ft of the Pecha Shale near Santa Rita, New Mexico.

The holotype of M. magnum is a 240 millimetres (9.4 in) long section of the phragmocone with 14 camerae and s short portion of the living chamber, the cross section of which increases from a width of 56 millimetres (2.2 in) and height of 37mm at the base to a width of 100 millimetres (3.9 in) and height of about 42 millimetres (1.7 in) at the anterior end. The chambers increase in length from 10–19 millimetres (0.39–0.75 in). Septal openings are 5mm across, rings expand so as segments are at least 16 millimetres (0.63 in) at their greatest width. Siphunclular deposits are thickest in the posterior part of the segments, become thin in the anterior part where they connect with the next deposit forward. Radial canals are as described for the genus.

The holotype of M. minor is a portion of a phragmocone with a natural horizontal section of the siphuncle with the ventral portion remaining and dorsal portion removed be erosion.

The M. magnum holotype is deposited with the Paleontological Research Institute while the M. minor holotype is in the paleontology collection of the New Mexico Museum of Natural History and Science, transferred from the New Mexico Bureau of Mines and Mineral Resources.
