= Axinolobidae =

Axinolobidae Temporal range: Pennsylvanian

Scientific classification
- Kingdom: Animalia
- Phylum: Mollusca
- Class: Cephalopoda
- Subclass: †Ammonoidea
- Order: †Goniatitida
- Superfamily: †Schistoceratoidea
- Family: †Axinolobidae; Ruzhencev, 1962

Genera
- Axinolobus; Faqingoceras; Paraphaneroceras

Extinct family of molluscs

Axinolobidae is one of five families of the Schistoceratoidea, a superfamily included in the Goniatitida, an extinct order of ammonoid cephalopods that lived during the late Paleozoic.
