= Carbactinoceratidae =

Carbactinoceratidae Temporal range: Early Carboniferous

Scientific classification
- Kingdom: Animalia
- Phylum: Mollusca
- Class: Cephalopoda
- Order: †Pseudorthocerida
- Family: †Carbactinoceratidae; Schindewolf, 1943

Genera
- Aploceras; Carbactinoceras; Rayonnoceras

Extinct family of molluscs

Carbactinoceratidae is a family of extinct cephalopods with external shells that lived around 325 million years ago, during the Carboniferous period. They were the last group of orthocones to attain sizes exceeding one meter (three feet) in length. One specimen of the carbactinoceratid species Rayonnoceras solidiforme, recently found in Arkansas, was measured at 2.5 metres (8.2 ft) long.

== Characters ==
Shells of carbactinoceratids are usually straight or slightly curved, with a large central or subcentral siphuncle. The first chamber at the apex is long and conical, the first septum slightly convex with the a septal perforation about one third of the shell diameter and a cyrtochoanitic septal neck (tubular or funnel-like projection from the back of the septum. The first siphuncle segment is elongated, subsequent ones formed during growth of the animal are subglobular (rounded but not spherical). Organic deposits are formed within the siphuncle through which run central, and radial canals along with a seam along the connecting rings known as a perispatium.

=== Genera ===
- Aploceras
- Carbactinoceras
- Rayonnoceras

== Relationships to other cephalopods ==
Schindewolf (1941) and Teichert (1964) classified the Carbactinoceratidae within the actinocerids based on siphuncle similarity. In both groups the siphuncle contains collar-like deposits and radial canals.

However, there are some problems with the actinocerid hypothesis. Carbactinocerids such as Carbactinoceras appear much later than the last definite actinocerids, leaving a large stratigraphic gap between the two. Furthermore, carbactinoceratids share key characters from the early development of pseudorthocerids missing from actinocerids. Among these is a bullet-shaped apex that is not constricted, and a first segment of the siphuncle that is relatively narrow. Moreover, pseudorthocerids abounded in the Carboniferous period and so eliminate the stratigraphic gap.
