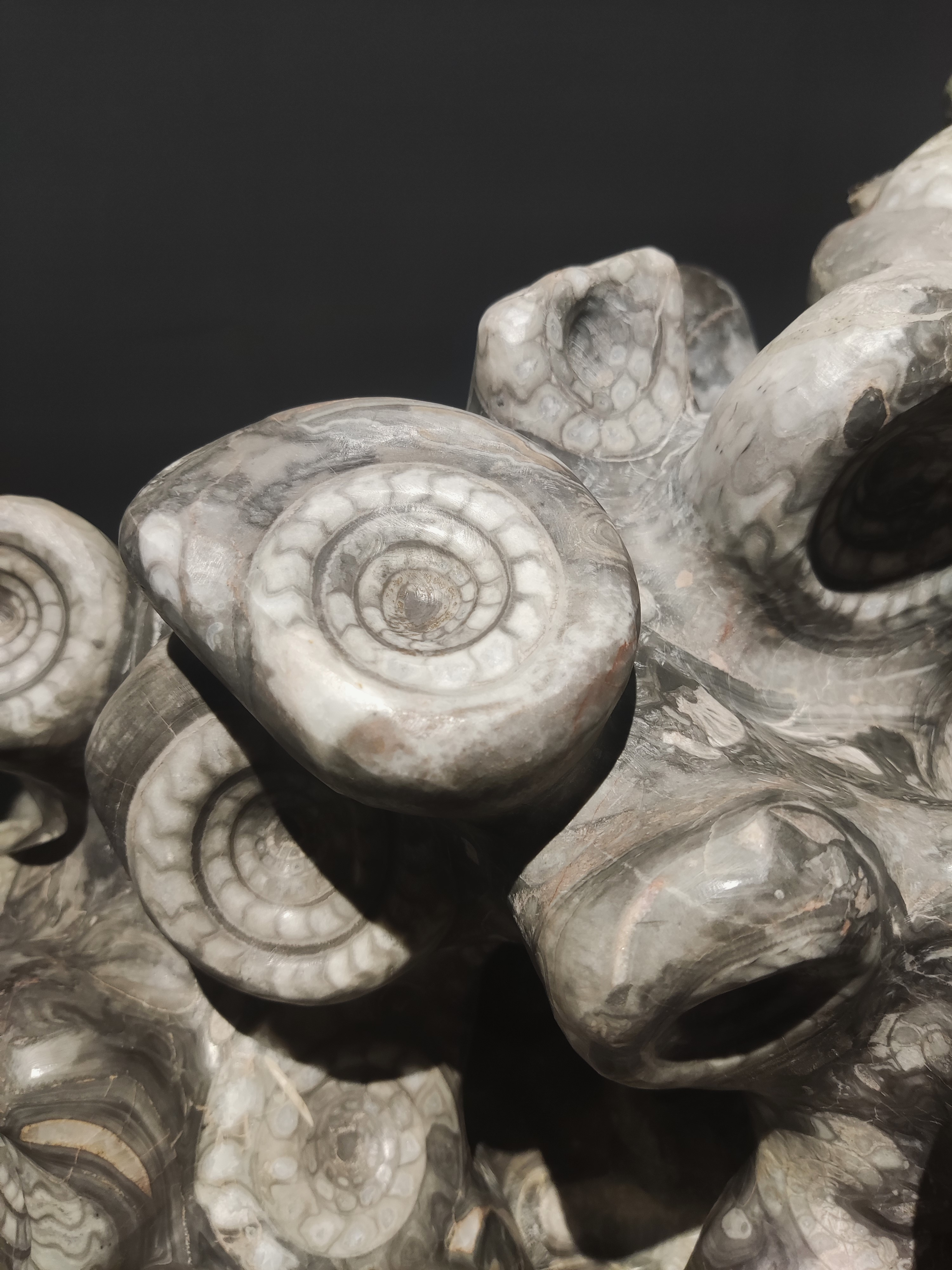
- Branneroceras reticulatum fossils

Scientific classification
- Kingdom: Animalia
- Phylum: Mollusca
- Class: Cephalopoda
- Subclass: †Ammonoidea
- Order: †Goniatitida
- Family: †Schistoceratidae
- Genus: †Branneroceras; Plummer and Scott, 1937

= Branneroceras =

Branneroceras Temporal range: Carboniferous

Extinct genus of molluscs

Branneroceras is a goniatitid genus from the Late Carboniferous (Middle -Late Pennsylvanian). Their fossils have been found in Nunavut, Canada, and in Arkansas and Texas, USA.

== Taxonomy ==
Branneroceras has been assigned to the Schistoceratidae, a family on goniatitid ammonoids included in the Schistocerataceae, now Schistoceratoidea. At one time Branneroceras was regarded as a subgenus of Gastrioceras, Gastrioceras (Branneroceras), but Gastrioceras is included in the Gastrioceratidae. The type species for Branneroceras is Gastrioceras branneri Smith, 1896.

== Morphology ==
The shell of Branneroceras is typically narrow, evolute, with a wide or moderately wide umbilicus. Coiling maybe slightly irregular. The surface has a crenulate appearance produced by biconvex growth lines crossed by fine longitudinal, wirelike, lirae. Ribs extend Laterally from the umbilical shoulder onto the lateral flanks and persist to full maturity. Growth lines form a ventral sinus and a ventrolateral projection or salient.

The ventral lobe at maturity is double pronged. Prongs are narrow, separated by a median saddle three quarters the height of the entire lobe.
