= Pseudactinoceras =

Pseudactinoceras Temporal range: U Dev - L Carb

Scientific classification
- Kingdom: Animalia
- Phylum: Mollusca
- Class: Cephalopoda
- Order: †Pseudorthocerida
- Family: †Pseudactinoceratidae
- Genus: †Pseudactinoceras; Schindewolf, 1943

Extinct genus of nautiloids

Pseudactinoceras is an extinct nautiloid cephalopod included in the order Pseudorthocerida and the namesake of the family Pseudactinoceratidae (Sweet, 1964).

== Description ==
Pseudactinocras are slightly depressed longiconic cyrtocones with a large siphuncle located between the center and ventral margin. Early siphuncle segments, in the juvenile phragmocone are suborthochoantic; later segments, in the mature phragmocone, become cyrtochoanitic, nummuloidal, broader than long. Parietal deposits lining the interior of the siphuncle grow more prominently forward than backward, with canals slightly anterior of segment centers. Thick cameral deposits develop ventrally, but are only thin dorsally (Sweet, 1964).

== Taxonomy ==
Pseudactinoceras was named by Schindewolf in 1943 (Sweet, 1964) and is the type genus of the pseudorthocerid family, Pseudactinoceratidae. The type species, P. promiscuum, came from the Lower Carboniferous (Visean = middle Mississippian) of Germany.

== See also ==
- List of nautiloids
