= Adnatoceras =

Adnatoceras Temporal range: Middle Devonian - Pennsylvanian

Scientific classification
- Kingdom: Animalia
- Phylum: Mollusca
- Class: Cephalopoda
- Order: †Pseudorthocerida
- Family: †Spyroceratidae
- Genus: †Adnatoceras; Flower, 1935

Genus of molluscs (fossil)

Adnatoceras is a genus of mid Devonian to Pennsylvanian orthoconic nautiloid cephalopods included in the pseudorthocerid family Spyroceratidae, characterized by tubular, straight-sided, siphuncle segments that expand abruptly at the septal foremen. In some species the siphuncle segments become more ovoid in the later grow stages. The name Adnatoceas comes from the wide area of contact, or adnation, between the connecting ring and flared out brim of the septal neck.
