= Rayonnoceras =

Rayonnoceras Temporal range: Mississippian - Pennsylvanian

Scientific classification
- Domain: Eukaryota
- Kingdom: Animalia
- Phylum: Mollusca
- Class: Cephalopoda
- Order: †Pseudorthocerida
- Family: †Carbactinoceratidae
- Genus: †Rayonnoceras; Croneis, 1926

Species
- See text

Extinct genus of nautiloids

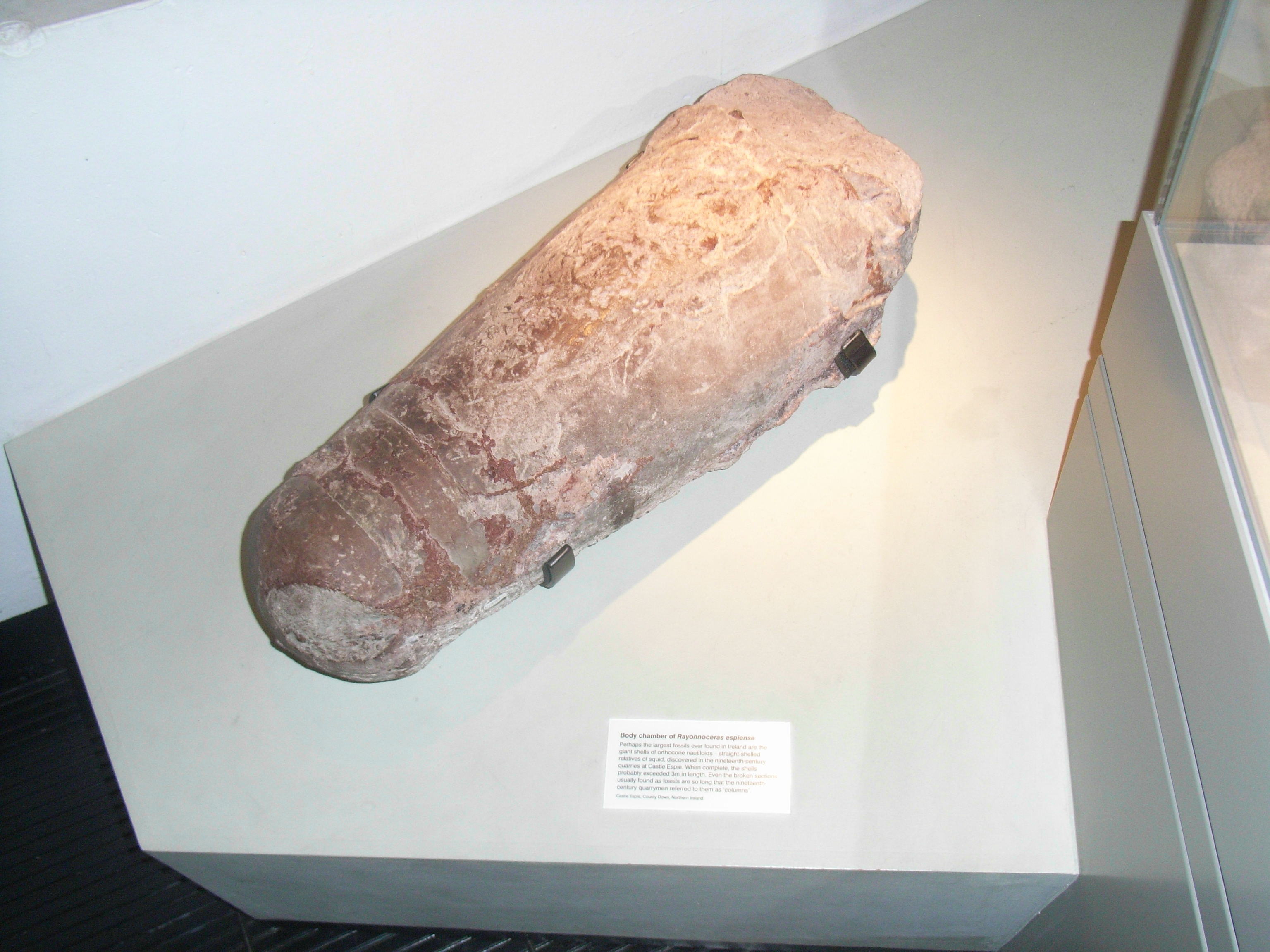
Rayonnoceras Espeyense Nautiloid.

Rayonnoceras is a genus of extinct cephalopods that lived around 325 million years ago during the Carboniferous. Although they resemble earlier actinocerids they are now thought to belong to the Pseudorthocerida

Rayonnoceras is characterized by large straight shells with a large subcentral siphuncle composed of subglobular segments, as for the family. The endosiphuncular canal system is well developed and most chambers are filled with organic deposits. Some shells have transverse striae, others are smooth. As with earlier actinocerids, Rayonnoceras has a canal system within the siphuncle that includes a narrow opening, the parispatium, between the internal deposits and inner wall of the connecting ring. It differs from the earlier actinocerids in having a bullet-like apex with a cicatrix and a long first chamber, characteristic of pseuorthocerids, rather than a blunt apex and short first chamber characteristic of true actinocerids.

Orientation during life was horizontal. Cameral deposits, more concentrated in the apical part of the shell, are thought to have acted as ballast that compensated for the weight of the animal in the forward part. In life Rayonnoceras was probably a bottom dweller that spent most of its time stationary, waiting in ambush for prey.

Rayonnoceras was among the last of the actinocerid-mimics, which finally died out in the Carboniferous.

In 2003 a specimen of Rayonnoceras solidiforme eight feet long (2.4m) was found in Arkansas. It is believed to be the largest of its kind ever found and is housed at the University of Arkansas Museum.
