= Orulganitidae =

Scientific classification
- Kingdom: Animalia
- Phylum: Mollusca
- Class: Cephalopoda
- Subclass: †Ammonoidea
- Order: †Goniatitida
- Superfamily: †Schistoceratoidea
- Family: †Orulganitidae; Ruzhencev, 1965

Genera
- Kayutoceras; Orulganites; Parayakutoceras; Yakutoceras; Yakutoglaphyrites; Yanshinoceras

Extinct family of molluscs

Orulganitidae is one of five families of the Schistoceratoidea superfamily. They are an extinct group of ammonoid, which are shelled cephalopods related to squids, belemnites, octopuses, and cuttlefish, and more distantly to the nautiloids.
