= Eowellerites =

Eowellerites Temporal range: Moscovian

Scientific classification
- Kingdom: Animalia
- Phylum: Mollusca
- Class: Cephalopoda
- Subclass: †Ammonoidea
- Order: †Goniatitida
- Family: †Welleritidae
- Genus: †Eowellerites; Ruzhentsev, 1957

Type species
- Bendoceras moorei Plummer & Scott, 1937

Species
- E. quinni Mapes & Furnish, 1981; E. mccalebi Mapes & Furnish, 1981; E. moorei Plummer & Scott, 1937

Synonyms
- Bendites Miller & Furnish, 1958

Genus of molluscs (fossil)

Eowellerites is genus of ammonoid cephalopods belonging to the Welleritidae family. Species belonging to this genus lived in middle Pennsylvanian (Moscovian). Its fossils were found in USA and Japan. It had thinly discoidal shells with a quite wide umbilicus (U/D = 0.3 - 0.5). While in juvenile stages (up to 15 mm in diameter) venter is moderately rounded, it becomes slightly rounded to flattened when becoming mature (100 mm in diameter). 12-lobed suture has adventitious lobe on the first lateral saddle and is also characterized by an addition of an umbilical lobe. Sutural formula is (V_{1} V_{1}) L^{1} L (U_{1} U_{2}): I D. It has evolved from Winslowoceras henbesti and gave rise to genus Wellerites.

== Species and distribution ==
=== Eowellerites quinni ===
Evolutionary first member of genus Eowellerites that has evolved from Winslowoceras henbesti. Most diagnostic character of its suture is its weakly developed adventitious lobe in the first lateral saddle. Degree of its evolution is intermediate between Winslowoceras henbesti and Eowellerites moorei. Weak development of this lobe distinguishes this species from both E. moorei and E. mccalebi. Winslowoceras is more primitive in this character.

This species has been found in USA (Arkansas) and Japan (Honshu island).

=== Eowellerites mccalebi ===
This is species of Eowellerites with asymmetrical prongs on ventral lobe. It also has broad and nearly symmetrical umbilical lobe. It can be distinguished from E. moorei by asymmetry of ventral prongs and more symmetrical and inflated umbilical lobe. From E. quinni it distinguishes by more developed adventitious lobe of first lateral saddle. It has evolved from E. quinni

It is known from only one locality, which is in USA (Arkansas, Crawford county).

=== Eowellerites moorei ===
Type species of this genus. It has evolved from E. mccalebi and gave rise to genus Wellerites. It differs from E. quinni by much more developed adventitious lobe of first lateral saddle and longer ventral lobe. E. mccalebi has more pounch-shaped prong of ventral lobe and more asymmetrical umbilical lobe. Specimens of this species shows two types of shell ornamentation. Sometimes, there is revolving ornamentation that becomes moderately reticulate near, or at the venter. In other cases, there is coarse ventral ornamentation and umbilical ribs. These different forms might be due to sexual dimorphism. Eowellerites discoidalis Gordon, 1965 is a synonym of this species based on the same type specimen.

Fossils of this species were found in USA (Arkansas and Texas) and Japan (Honshu island).
