= Schistoceratoidea =

Scientific classification
- Kingdom: Animalia
- Phylum: Mollusca
- Class: Cephalopoda
- Subclass: †Ammonoidea
- Order: †Goniatitida
- Suborder: †Goniatitina
- Superfamily: †Schistoceratoidea; Schmidt 1929

Families
- Axinolobidae; Christioceratidae; Orulganitidae; Schistoceratidae; Welleritidae

Synonyms
- Schistocerataceae

Extinct superfamily of molluscs

Schistoceratoidea is one of seventeen superfamilies of the Goniatitina suborder. They are an extinct group of ammonoid, which are shelled cephalopods related to squids, belemnites, octopuses, and cuttlefish, and more distantly to the nautiloids.
