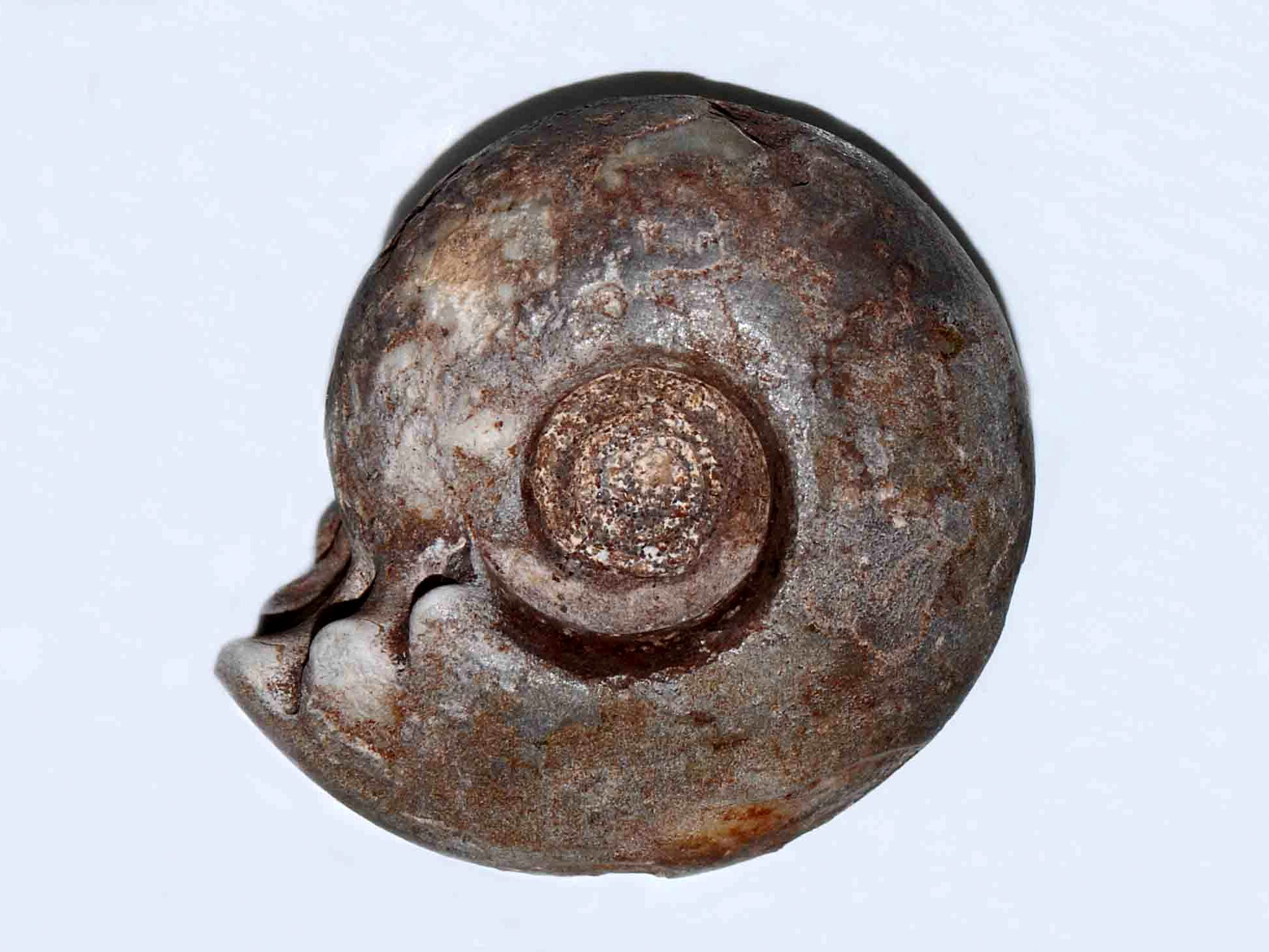
- Metalegoceras sundaicum

Scientific classification
- Kingdom: Animalia
- Phylum: Mollusca
- Class: Cephalopoda
- Subclass: †Ammonoidea
- Order: †Goniatitida
- Family: †Metalegoceratidae
- Genus: †Metalegoceras; Schindewolf 1931

Synonyms
- Paralegoceras

= Metalegoceras =

Metalegoceras Temporal range: Permian, 295–265 Ma

Genus of molluscs (fossil)

Metalegoceras is an extinct genus of marine cephalopods belonging to the family Schistoceratidae.

== Species ==
- Metalegoceras ajdaralense
- Metalegoceras arcticum
- Metalegoceras aricki
- Metalegoceras australe
- Metalegoceras baylorense
- Metalegoceras crenatum
- Metalegoceras evolutum
- Metalegoceras hudsoni
- Metalegoceras kayi
- Metalegoceras klimovi
- Metalegoceras liratum
- Metalegoceras pamiricum
- Metalegoceras platyventrum
- Metalegoceras rotundatum
- Metalegoceras schucherti
- Metalegoceras shangraoense
- Metalegoceras shyndense
- Metalegoceras sogurense
- Metalegoceras spirale
- Metalegoceras striatum
- Metalegoceras sundaicum
- Metalegoceras toumanskayae
- Metalegoceras tschernyschewi

== Distribution ==
This species have been found in the Permian of Australia, Canada, China, East Timor, Indonesia, Kazakhstan, Malaysia, Oman, Russia and United States.
