= Pseudactinoceratidae =

Pseudactinoceratidae Temporal range: U Devonian- L Carboniferous

Scientific classification
- Kingdom: Animalia
- Phylum: Mollusca
- Class: Cephalopoda
- Order: †Pseudorthocerida
- Family: †Pseudactinoceratidae; Schindewolf (1943)

Extinct family of cephalopods

Pseudactinoceratidae is a family in the cephalopod order Pseudorthocerida, known from the Upper Devonian and Lower Carboniferous (Mississippian).

Pseuactinocerids are characterized by elongated, straight and gently curved shells with a subcentral siphuncle composed of broadly expanded segments in the adult in which there are internal deposits pieced by two series of radial canals. Deposits form initially at the septal openings and grow mostly forward to connect with the next deposit in the anterior part of the next segment. The radial canals connect the interior of the segments with the ends of the connecting rings as they approach adjacent septa. Camerae, which are generally short, are commonly filled with organic deposits.

Flower preferred the term Macroloxoceratidae, (ex Macrolooxcerainae, a subfamily in the Pseuorthoceratidae) which he proposed; reasoning that since Macroloxoceras is based on an adult specimen and is better defined than Pseudactinoceras which is based on a juvenile portion of a phagmocone, it is a better choice by which the (sub)family should be named.
