= Axinolobus =

Axinolobus Temporal range: Moscovian

Scientific classification
- Kingdom: Animalia
- Phylum: Mollusca
- Class: Cephalopoda
- Subclass: †Ammonoidea
- Order: †Goniatitida
- Family: †Axinolobidae
- Genus: †Axinolobus; Gordon 1960

Type species
- Axinolobus modulus Gordon, 1960

Species
- A. modulus Gordon, 1960; A. percostatus Schmidt, 1955; A. quinni McCaleb & Furnish, 1964

Genus of molluscs (fossil)

Axinolobus is a genus belonging to the Axinolobidae family. They are an extinct group of ammonoid, which are shelled cephalopods related to squids, belemnites, octopuses, and cuttlefish, and more distantly to the nautiloids.
