= Spyroceratidae =

Spyroceratidae Temporal range: M Silurian - Permian

Scientific classification
- Domain: Eukaryota
- Kingdom: Animalia
- Phylum: Mollusca
- Class: Cephalopoda
- Order: †Pseudorthocerida
- Family: †Spyroceratidae; Shimazu & Obata 1935

Family of nautiloidea

Spyroceratidae are defined as Pseudorthocerida with uniformly slender siphuncle segments, longer than wide, that contract sharply near either end, in which endosiphuncular deposits first form a compete annulus before fusing ventrally.
