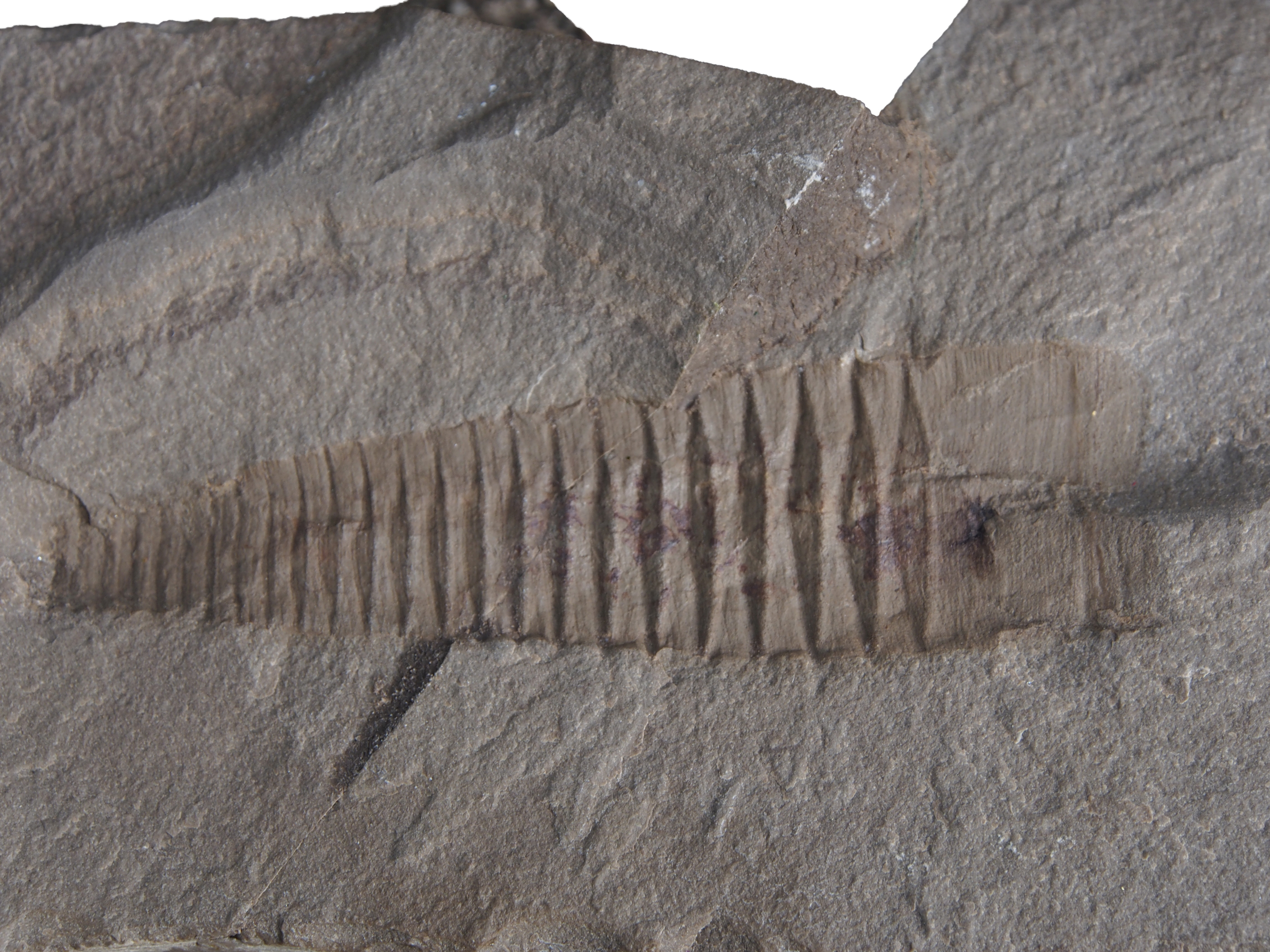
- Reticycloceras, a Carboniferous pseudorthocerid

Scientific classification
- Domain: Eukaryota
- Kingdom: Animalia
- Phylum: Mollusca
- Class: Cephalopoda
- Subclass: †Orthoceratoidea
- Order: †Pseudorthocerida; Barskov 1963, from Flower & Caster, 1935

= Pseudorthocerida =

Pseudorthocerida Temporal range: Silurian–Triassic

Extinct order of molluscs

Pseudorthocerida is an order of generally straight longiconic (consisting of longicones - long, thin conic shells) orthoceratoids with a subcentral to marginal cyrtochoanitic siphuncle composed of variably expanded segments which may contain internal deposits that may develop into a continuous parietal lining. (Sweet 1964). Cameral deposits are common and concentrated ventrally. Apices typically have a slight to moderate exogastric curvature

The Pseudorthocerida are included in a broad in-group of generally orthoconic cephalopods known as the Orthoceratoidea (Kroger 2008) along with the Ascocerida, Dissidocerida, Lituitida, and Orthocerida.

The Pseudorthocerida were among the last living orthoconic nautiloids. One family, the Trematoceratidae, survived into the Triassic Period.

== Taxonomy ==
=== Current understanding ===
By current understanding the Pseudorthocerida contains the following families:

- Pseudorthoceratidae
- Cayutoceratidae
- Pseudactinoceratidae
- Spyroceratidae
- Carbactinoceratidae
- Trematoceratidae

The Pseudorthoceratidae through Spyroceratidae are presented as subfamilies in Sweet (1964) and are included in the Pseudorthoceratidae sensu Sweet (1964). The Carbactinoceratidae are removed from the Actinocerida in Kroger and Mapes (2007).

=== Earlier perspectives ===
Pseudorthocerids were previously known as the Pseudorthocerataceae, a superfamily within the Orthocerida (Sweet 1964) which included the Silurian and later Pseudorthoceratidae and Middle Ordovician to Middle Silurian Proteoceratidae. Both have siphuncles that are partly cyrochoanitic with expanded segments and internal deposits but differ in the manner in which they develop.

Flower (1976) distinguished Middle Ordovician pseudorthocerids from Silurian and later pseudorthocerids on the basis of how the siphuncle changes during the life of the animal. The earlier Proteoceratidae begin cyrtochoanitic with expanded segments and end up orthochoanitic with subcylindrical segments. As juveniles they are "pseudorthoceratoid", as mature individuals they are "orthoceratoid". In contrast the later Pseudorthoceratidae, begin orthochoanitic with subcylindrical segments and ontogenetically become cyrtochoanitic with expanded segments. As such they matured into "pseudorthoceratoids" from "orthoceratoid" juveniles. From this Flower (1976) concluded that the Ordovician and Silurian pseudorthocerids (sensu Sweet 1964) were derived from different orthocerids (Orthocerida) and were therefore polyphyletic. As a result, true pseudorthocerids were limited to the Pseudorthoceratidae while the earlier Ordovician look-a-likes were retained in the Orthocerida (Michelinocerida Flower)
