= Fayetteville Shale =

Geologic formation in Arkansas and Oklahoma, United States

- Stratigraphic range: Carboniferous: Mississippian (Serpukhovian)
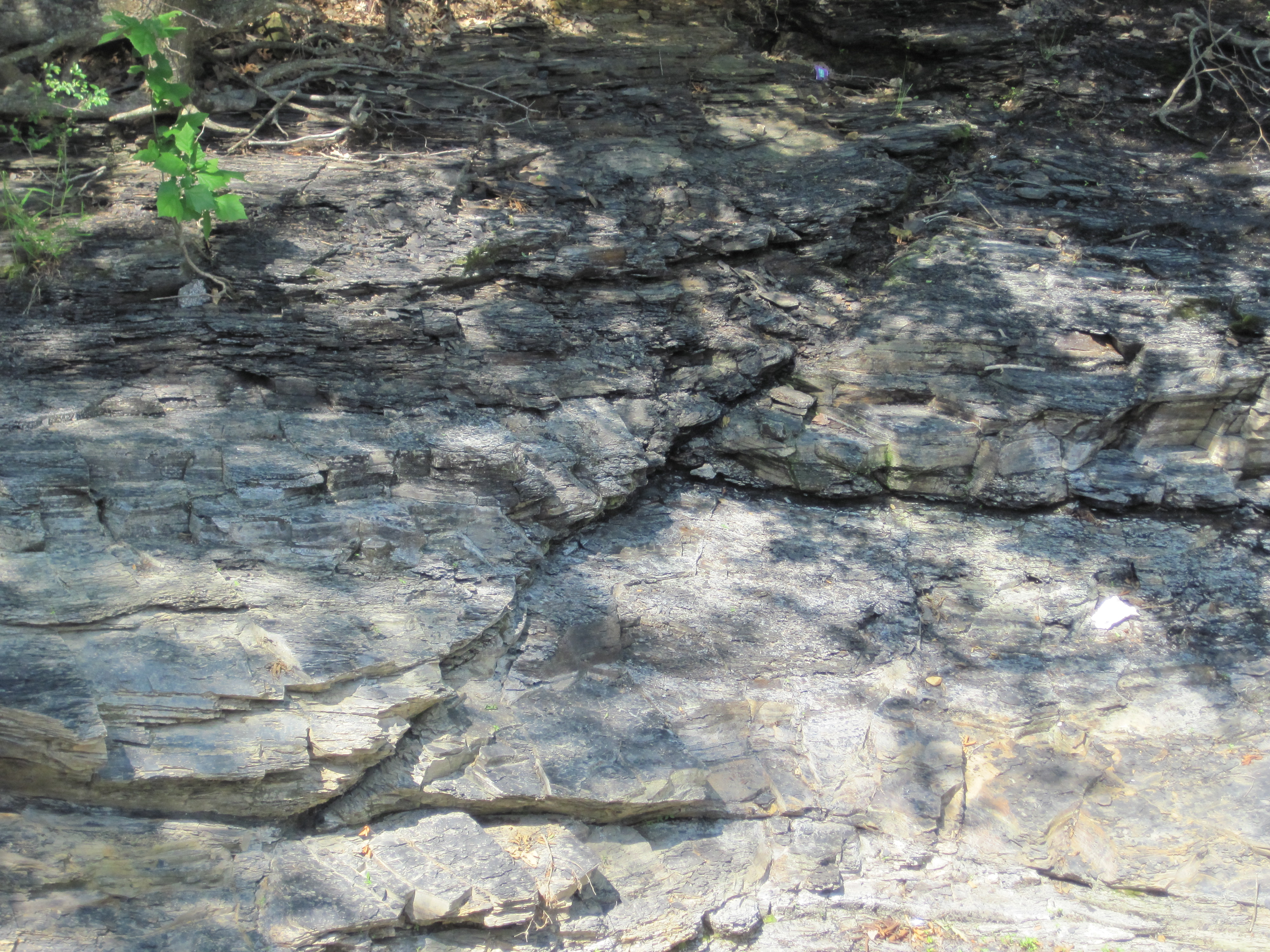
- Outcrop of the lower Fayetteville Shale in northern Arkansas
- Type: Geological formation
- Sub-units: Wedington Sandstone Member
- Underlies: Pitkin Limestone, Hale Formation
- Overlies: Ruddell Shale, Batesville Sandstone Moorefield Shale
- Area: Arkansas and Oklahoma
- Thickness: 50 to 500 feet (15 to 152 m)

Lithology
- Primary: Shale
- Other: Sandstone, limestone

Location
- Region: Arkansas
- Country: United States
- Extent: 50 miles (80 km)

Type section
- Named for: Fayetteville, Washington County, Arkansas
- Named by: Frederick Willard Simonds
- The Fayetteville formation runs widespread across Arkansas

The Fayetteville Shale is a geologic formation of Mississippian age (354–323 million years ago) composed of tight shale within the Arkoma Basin of Arkansas and Oklahoma. It is named for the city of Fayetteville, Arkansas, and requires hydraulic fracturing to release the natural gas contained within.

== Nomenclature ==
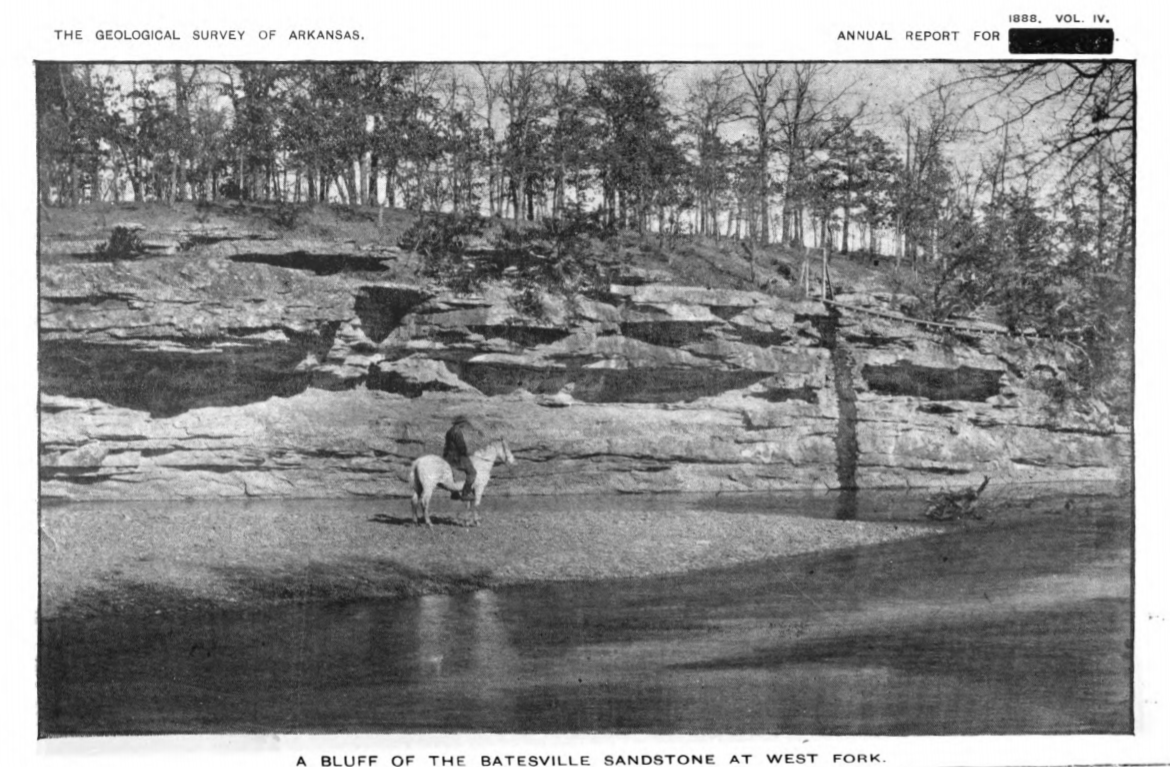
Photograph of the Wedington Sandstone Member (mistaken as Batesville Sandstone) circa 1891

Named by Frederick Willard Simonds in 1891, Simonds recognized what is now the Fayetteville Shale as three separate formations overlying the now abandoned Wyman Sandstone: the Fayetteville Shale, the Batesville Sandstone, and the Marshall Shale. In 1904, the name "Fayetteville Shale" replaced all three of these names. The Fayetteville Shale that Simonds recognized is now considered as the lower Fayetteville Shale. Simonds' Batesville Sandstone was found to be the same as the Wyman Sandstone, and replaced the name "Wyman Sandstone", while Simonds' Batesville Sandstone became known as the "Wedington Sandstone Member" presumably after Wedington Mountain. The name Marshall Shale was abandoned and is now known as the upper Fayetteville Shale.

== Natural gas ==
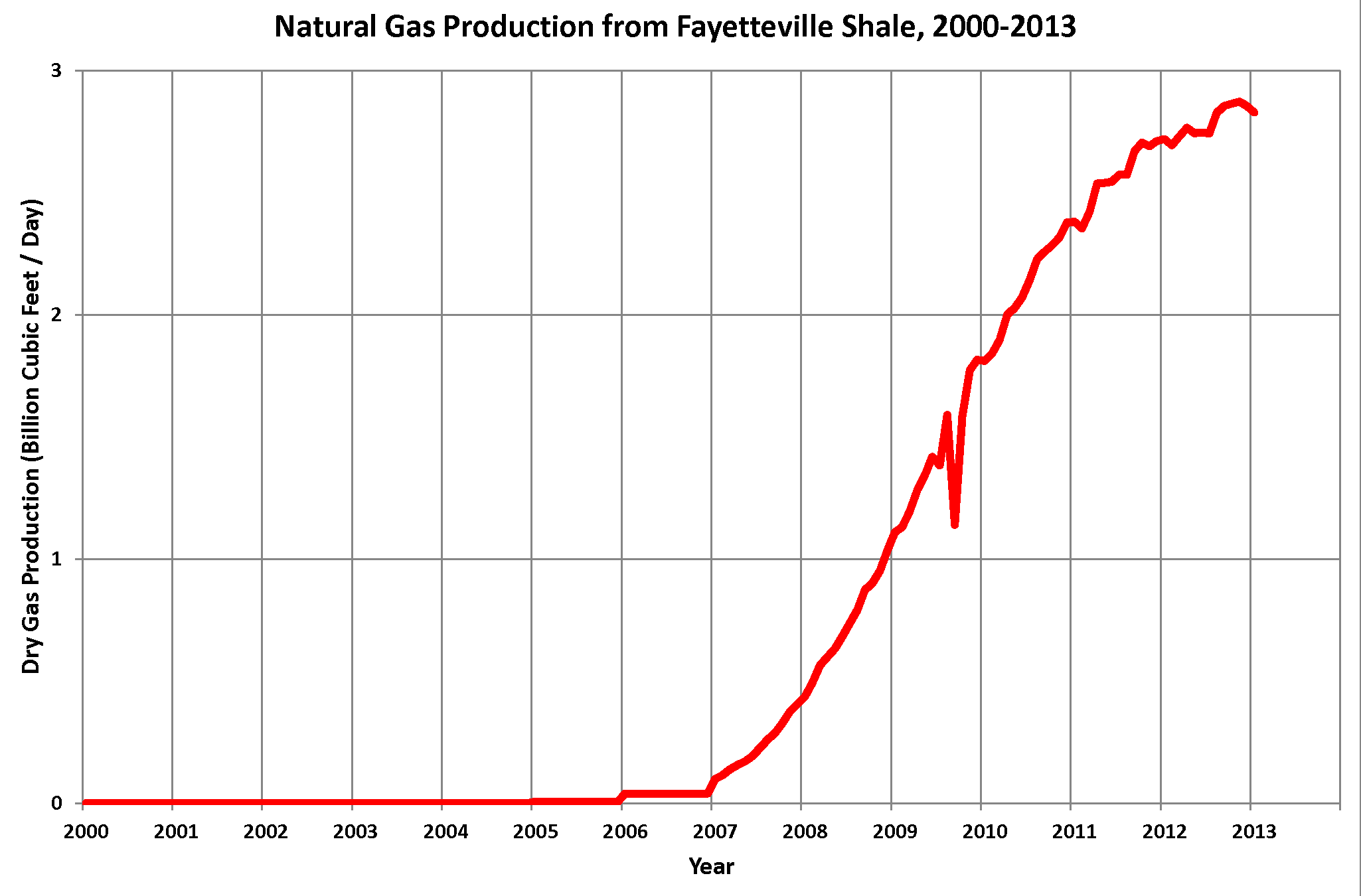
Gas production from Fayetteville Shale

The formation holds natural gas in a fine-grained rock matrix which requires hydraulic fracturing to release the gas. This process became cost-effective in some shales such as the Fayetteville after years of experimentation in the Barnett Shale in North Texas, especially when combined with horizontal drilling.

The Fayetteville Shale play began in July 2004 when Southwestern Energy drilled the Thomas #1-9 vertical well in Conway County, Arkansas. In February 2005, Southwestern Energy drilled the first horizontal well, the Seeco-Vaughan #4-22H, also in Conway County.

The US Energy Information Administration estimated that the 5,853 square miles (15,160 km^{2}) shale play held 13,240 billion cubic ft (375 billion cubic meters) of unproved, technically recoverable gas. The average well was estimated to produce 1.3 billion cubic feet of gas. As of 2018, new drilling in the Fayetteville Shale had ceased and almost 1/5 of wells were abandoned.

== Paleontology ==
=== Flora ===
Because the Fayetteville Formation is a marine unit, most of the plants found in the black shales must have been washed into the Carboniferous sea from a landmass. However one unit within the formation, the Weddington Sandstone Member, is a series of river deposited sand beds. Fossil plants from this unit were probably deposited closer to their source.

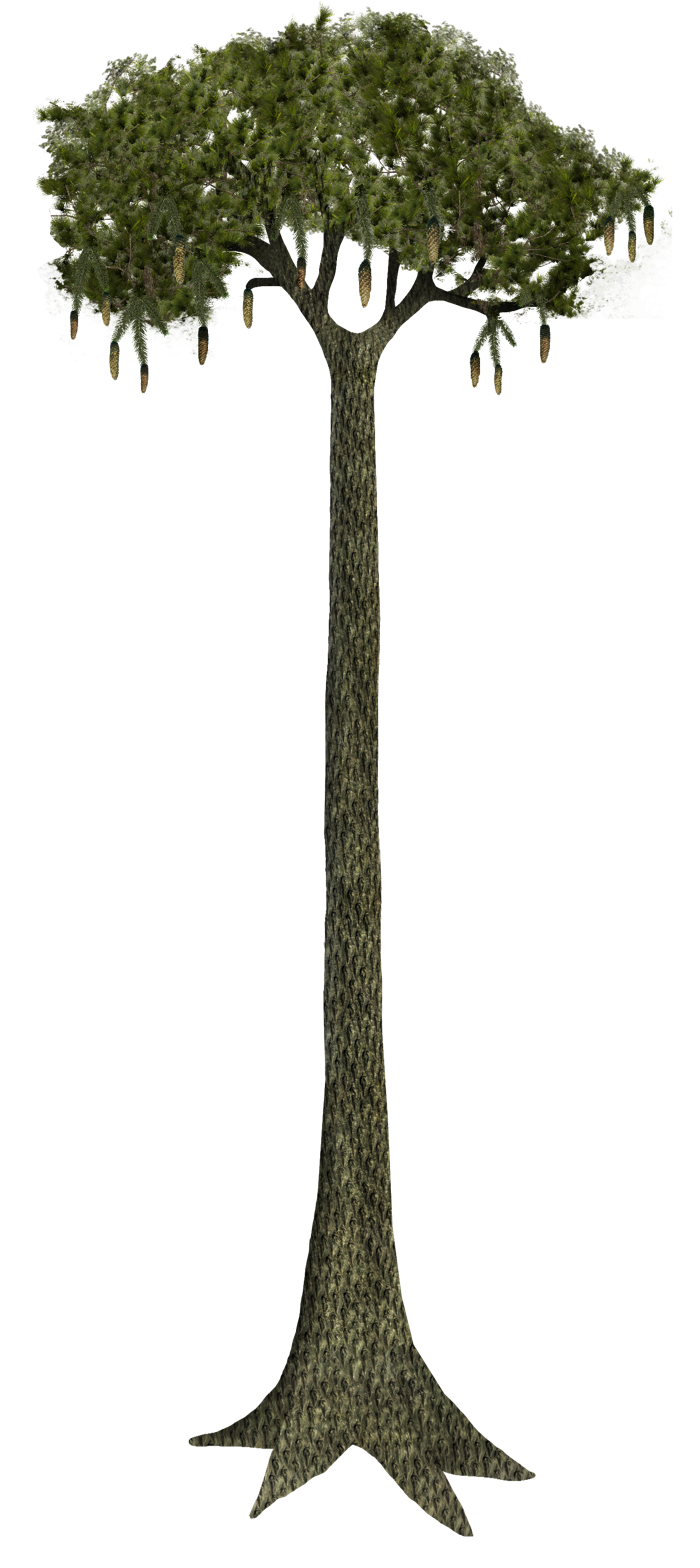
Artist's impression of a Lepidodendron

- Adiantites

A. minima

- Ankyropteris
- Archaeocalamites

A. fayettevillensis
A. gracilentus
A. umbralis
A. wedingtonensis

- Bothrodendron
- Carpolithus

C. inquirenda

- Cardiopteris

C. hirta

- Chlamidostachys

C. chesterianus

- Lepidocystis

L. chesterensis

- Lepidodendron

L. henbesti
L. occidentale
L. purduei
L. wedingtonense

- Lepidophloios
- Lepidophyllum

L. sagittatum

- Lepidostrobus

L. occidentalis

- Lepidostrous
- Lyginopteris

L. royalii

- Medullosa
- Neuropteris
- Pachytesta
- Rhacopteris
- Rhynchogonium

R. fayettevillense

- Rhynochosperma

R. quinnii

- Sphenopteris

S. (Palmatopteris) erectiloba
S. (Calymmatotheca) mississippiana

- Stigmaria

S. arkansana
S. wedingtonensis

- Tivena

T. arkansana

=== Fauna ===
==== Vertebrates ====
- Carcharopsis wortheni
- "Cobelodus" (remains now attributed to Ozarcus)
- Cosmoselachus mehlingi
- Ozarcus mapesae

==== Echinoderms ====
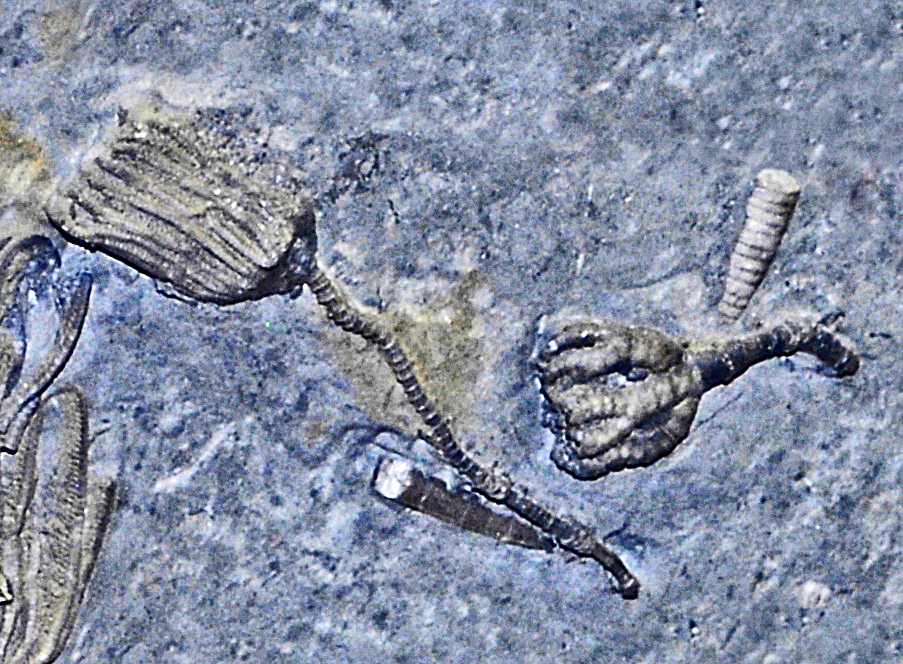
Fossil of the upper portion of Taxocrinus (on the right)

- Acrocrinus constrictus
- Agassizocrinus conicus
- Alcimocrinus ornatus
- Allocatillocrinus carpenteri
- Ampelocrinus erectus
- Aphelecrinus exoticus

- A. planus

- Childonocrinus trinodus
- Cymbiocrinus gravis
- Dasciocrinus aulicus
- Heliosocrinus aftonensis
- Intermediacrinus modernus
- Linocrinus
- Mantikosocrinus castus
- Onchyocrinus
- Onychocrinus pulaskiensis
- Ophiurocrinus hebdenensis
- Pentremites platybasis

- P. pulchellus

- Phacelocrinus
- Phanocrinus

- P. alexanderi
- P. cylindricus
- P. formosus

- Scytalocrinus aftonensis
- Taxocrinus cestriensis

- T. whitefieldi.

- Ulrichicrinus chesterensis

==== Cephalopods ====
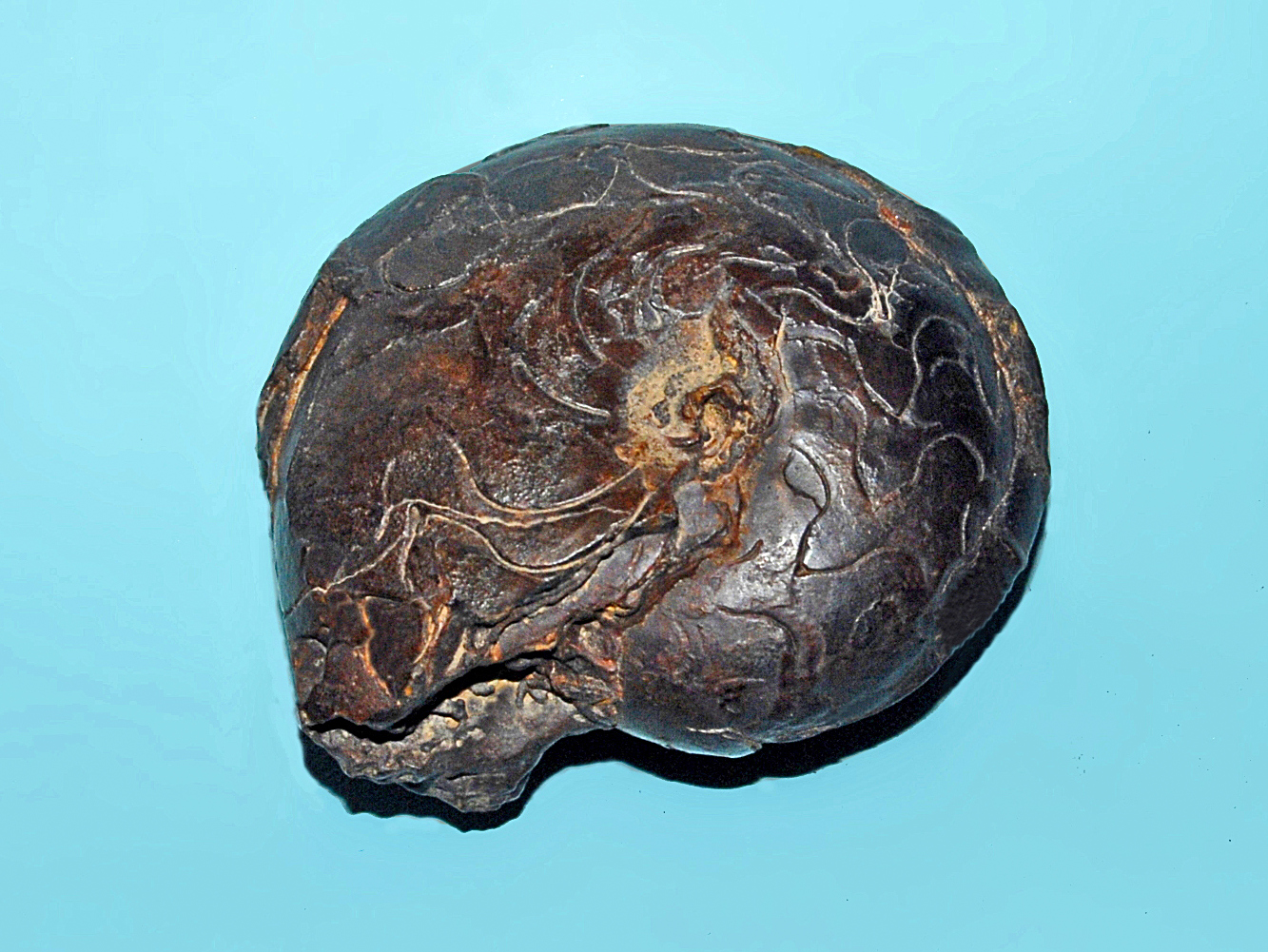
Fossil of Goniatites

- Arcanoceras furnishi
- Cluthoceras glicki
  - Cluthoceras pisiforme
- Cravenoceras fayettevillae
  - Cravenoceras lineolatum
- Dombarites mapesi
- Eurmorphoceras plummeri
- Fayettevillea planorbis
- Girtyoceras
- Goniatites granosus
- Lusitanites subcircularis
- Metadimorphoceras wiswellense
- Neoglyphioceras crebriliratum
- Paracravenoceras ozarkense
- Paradimorphoceras
- Pronorites baconi
- Rayonnoceras solidiforme
- Tumulites varians

==== Corals ====
- Amplexus expansus
- Michelinia meekana
- Palaecris carinata

==== Bivalves ====
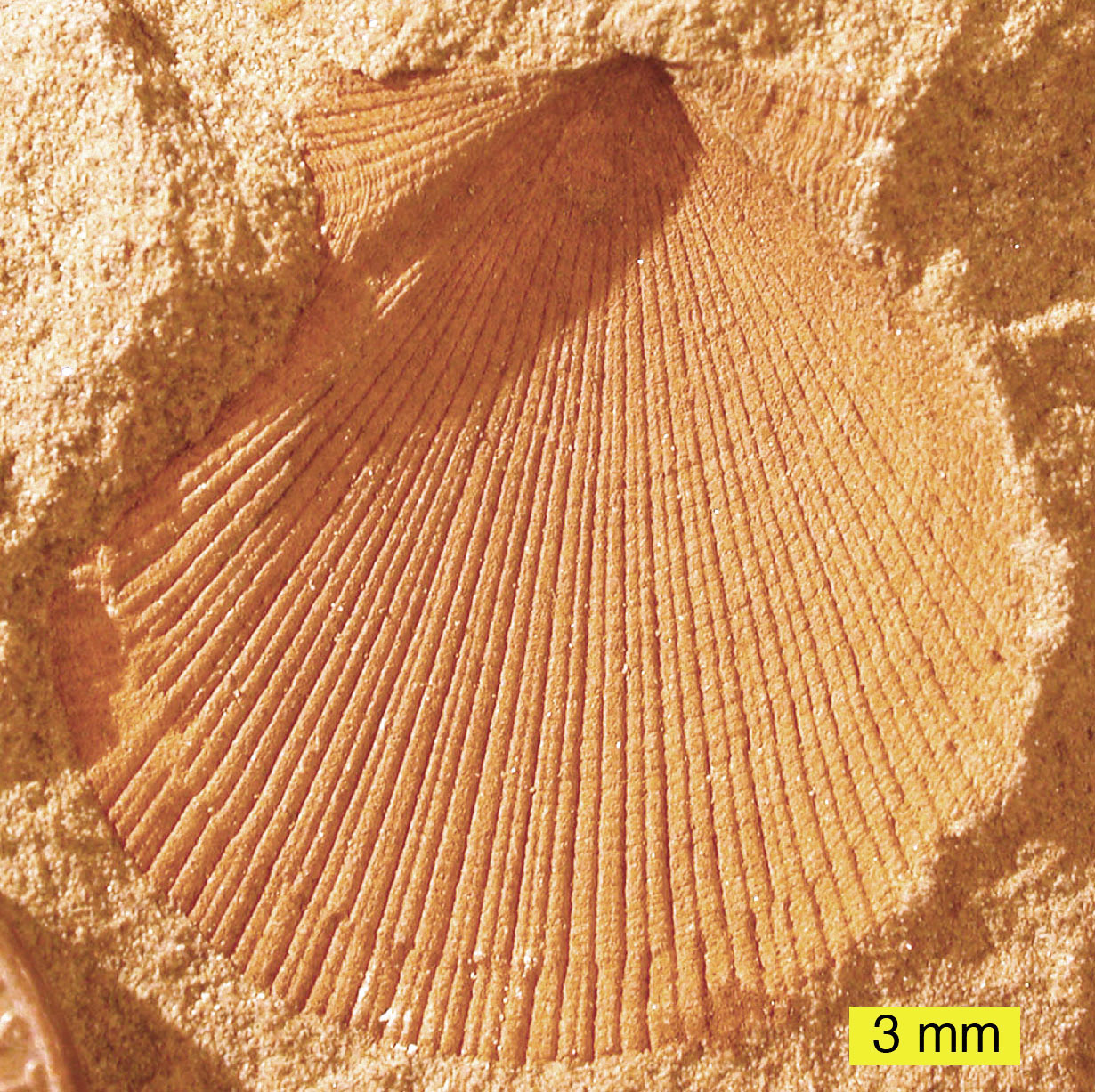
Aviculopecten subcardiformis from the Logan Formation (Lower Carboniferous) of Wooster, Ohio (external mold).

- Aviculopecten squamula
  - Aviculopecten jennyi
  - Aviculopecten multilineatus
  - Aviculopecten morrowensis
  - Aviculopecten inspeciosus
- Canyella peculiaris
- Cardiomorpha inflata
- Conocardium peculiare
- Cypricardia fayettevillensis
- Cyprecardella sublata
- Edmondia equilateralis
- Palaeoneilo sera
- Phestia stevensiana
- Solenamorpha nitida
- Sphenotus branneri
  - Sphenotus washingtonensis
  - Sphenotus dubius
  - Sphenotus meslerianus

==== Brachiopods ====
- Adairia adairensis
- Inflatia gracilis
  - Inflatia cherokeensis
  - Inflatia pusilla
  - Inflatia inflata
- Orthotetes protensus
  - Orthotetes subglobosus

==== Gastropods ====
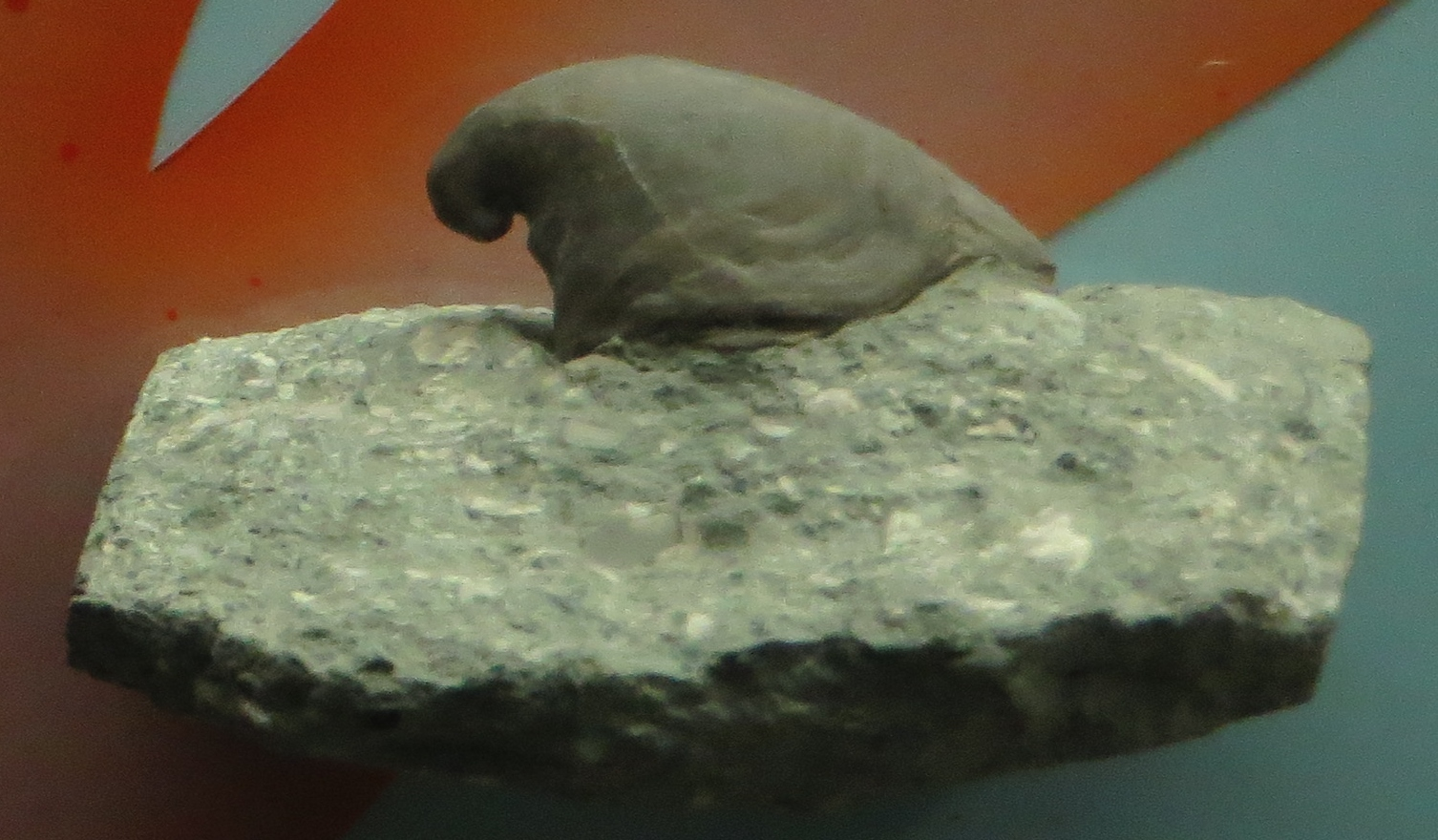
Platyceras sp. from Museo di Storia Naturale di Milano.

- Euconospira disjuncta
- Mourlonia lativittata
- Patellilabia laevigata
- Platyceras subelegans
  - Platyceras compressum
- Sinuitina venata
- Trepospira discus

==== Arthropods ====
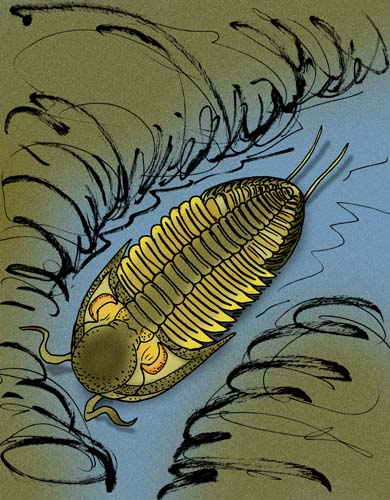
A life-reconstruction of the trilobite Paladin.

- Cyrtoproetus kerhini
- Paladin murconatus
- Paraparchites

===== Ostracods =====
- Amphissites
- Bairdia
- Cavellina
- Geisina
- Glyptopleura
- Graphiadactyllis
- Kegelites
- Kirkbya
- Orthobairdia
- Roundyella
- Sansabella
- Sargentina
- Serenida

==== Bryozoans ====
- Archimedes communis
  - Archimedes compactus
  - Archimedes confertus
  - Archimedes distans
  - Archimedes inflatus
  - Archimedes intermedius
  - Archimedes invaginatus
  - Archimedes meekanus
  - Archimedes owenanus
  - Archimedes proutanus
  - Archimedes sublaxus
  - Archimedes terebriformis
- Batostomella parvula
- Fenestella cestriensis
  - Fenestella compress
  - Fenestella elevatipora
  - Fenestella serratula
  - Fenestella tenax
- Leioclema
- Polypora cestriensis
  - Polypora corticosa
  - Polypora spinulifera
- Rhombopora tabulata
- Septopora cestriensis
- Streblotrypa nicklesi
  - Streblotrypa subspinosa
- Sulcoretepora americana
  - Sulcoretepora labiosa
  - Sulcoretepora nitida
- Thamniscus turcillatus

==== Foraminifera ====
- Earlandia
- Eosigmoilina rugosa

==== Trace Fossils ====
- Cruziana
- Planolites
- Teichichnus
