= Lyrogoniatites =

Lyrogoniatites Temporal range: Upper Mississippian

Scientific classification
- Domain: Eukaryota
- Kingdom: Animalia
- Phylum: Mollusca
- Class: Cephalopoda
- Subclass: †Ammonoidea
- Order: †Goniatitida
- Family: †Cravenoceratidae
- Subfamily: †Lyrogoniatitinae
- Genus: †Lyrogoniatites; Miller & Furnish 1940

Genus of molluscs (fossil)

Lyrogoniatitites is a neoglyphioceratoidean ammonite, in the order Goniatitida, related to genera like Alaoceras, Cravenoceras, Dumbarigloria and Pachylyroceras.

== Description ==
Lyrogoniatites is similar to Neoglyphioceras, but with broader shell and a smaller number (30-60) of longitudinal lirae and with a ventral (hyponomic) sinus and ventrolateral salients (projections) in all growth stages. As with Neoglyphioceras the ventral lobe is rather narrow.

== Taxonomic relations ==
W.M. Furnish, et al., 2009, in the revised Treatise includes Lyrogoniatites in the neoglyphioceratid subfamily, Lyrogoniatitinae, along with Alaoceras, Caenolyroceras, Dombarigloria, and Pachylyroceras. D. Korn (2006) on the other hand put Lyrogoniatites in the neoglyphioceratacean family Cravenoceratidae instead, and in the subfamily Lyrogoniatitinae along with such as Caenolyroceras and Pachylyroceras. Others, (e.g. GONIAT) also include Lyrogoniatites in the Cravenoceratidae but in the Cravenoceratinae.

The older Treatise (Miller, Furnish, and Schindiwold 1957) puts Lyrogoniatites along with Neoglyphioceras in the Goniatitidae and subfamily Neoglyphioceratinae, differentiating the two on the basis of the umbilicus—that of Lyrogoniatites being moderately large, that of Neoglyphioceras being narrow.
