= Cravenoceras =

Cravenoceras Temporal range: U Miss - L Penn

Scientific classification
- Kingdom: Animalia
- Phylum: Mollusca
- Class: Cephalopoda
- Subclass: †Ammonoidea
- Order: †Goniatitida
- Family: †Cravenoceratidae
- Subfamily: †Cravenoceratinae
- Genus: †Cravenoceras; Bisat, 1928

Genus of molluscs (fossil)

Cravenoceras is an Upper Paleozoic ammonite in the goniatite family Cravenoceratidae, probably derived from Pachylyroceras and contemporary with other cravenoceratid genera like Caenolyroceras, Tympanoceras and later Alaoceras and Lyrogoniatites. It is also a member of the Neoglyphioceratoidea.

== Description ==
The shell of Cravenoceras is thickly discoidal to globose and moderately to widely umbilicate. Young stages are mostly extremely evolute. Sculpture consists of transverse lamellae, which are more or less straight on the flanks, but form a shallow ventral sinus. Longitudinal lirae mostly absent or very faint, sometimes restricted to umbilical shoulder. Constrictions are weak or absent. The ventral lobe is narrow, with a relatively low median saddle.

== Taxonomic position ==
The revised Treatise (Furnish et al. 2009) includes Cravenoceras in the family Cravenoceratidae and subfamily Cravenoceratinae, along with 8 other genera including Tympanoceras and Cravenoceratoides. D. Korn (2006) and Saunders, Work, and Nikolaeva, 1999, along with GONIAT online give the same or a similar perspective. The older Treatise, Part L, 1957 (Miller, Furnish, and Schindewolf), on the other hand, put Cravenoceras in the subfamily Goniatitinae of the goniatitacean family Goniatitidae.

== Statigraphy ==
In western and central Europe, the lower boundary of the Silesian was defined in 1958 as the first occurrence of Cravenoceras leion.
