= Pachylyroceras =

Pachylyroceras Temporal range: Upper Mississippian

Scientific classification
- Kingdom: Animalia
- Phylum: Mollusca
- Class: Cephalopoda
- Order: Goniatitida
- Family: Cravenoceratidae
- Subfamily: ?Lyrogoniatitinae
- Genus: Pachylyroceras Ruzhentsev & Bogoslovskaia, 1971

Genus of molluscs (fossil)

Pachylyroceras is a large, generally subglobular, Upper Mississippian gonitite and included in the cephalopod subclass Ammonoidea.

== Recognition ==
Pachylyroceras produced a large shell that is moderately evolute to moderately involute and thickly discoidal to subglobular, with a rather wide umbilicus. Surface sculpture consists of coarse, widely spaced longitudinal lirae. Constrictions where present are wide and deep. Its suture has a narrow bifurcated ventral lobe with slightly divergent to subparallel sides and a median saddle less than half the height.

== Taxonomic position ==
Pachylyroceras, named by Ruzhentsev & Bogoslovskaia (1971), is included in the Neoglyphiocerataceae, (sometimes written Neoglyphioceratoidea), but its position within the superfamily varies according to whose classification.

The revised version of the Treatise, Part L (W. M. Furnish et al. 2009 ) includes Pachylyroceras as well as Alaoceras, Caenolyroceras, Dombarigloria, and Lyrogoniatites in the Neoglyphioceratidae and subfamily Lyrogoniatitinae. Dieter Korn (2006) also included Pachyhlyroceras in the Lyrogoniatitinae, but in the family Cravenoceratidae. Saunder, Work, and Nickoleava (1999) also included Pachyhlroceras in the Cravenoceratidae, but without regarding subfamilies. Others (GONIAT) include Pachylyroceras in the Gravenoceratid subfamily Cravenoceratinae instead.

The Treatise (Miller, Furnish, and Schindewolf 1957) includes Lyrogoniatites, from which Pachylroceras is probably derived, in the subfamily Neoglyphioceratinae along with Neoglyphioceras, but in the superfamily Goniatitaceae. The might suggest where Pachylyroceras might have been put, if it had been named and described at that time.
