= Quasicravenoceras =

Quasicravenoceras Temporal range: Carboniferous

Scientific classification
- Domain: Eukaryota
- Kingdom: Animalia
- Phylum: Mollusca
- Class: Cephalopoda
- Subclass: †Ammonoidea
- Order: †Goniatitida
- Family: †Cravenoceratidae
- Subfamily: †Cravenoceratinae
- Genus: †Quasicravenoceras; Ruzhentsev and Bogoslovskaya 1971

Genus of molluscs (fossil)

Quasicravenoceras is a genus of ammonites in the goniatitid family Cravenoceratidae from the Carboniferous of Russia and Kazakhstan, included in the Neoglyphioceratoidea. The type species is Quasicravenoceras consuetum Ruzhencev & Bogoslovskaya, 1971.

== Diagnosis ==
Quasicravenoveras is characterized by a moderately large, variably involute, subdiscoidal shell, or conch. The surface is covered with sharp lamella that can appear as narrow ribs. The sides of the ventral lobe are divergent, separated by a short median saddle

Related genera include Cravenoceras, Cravenoceratoides, Emstites, and Gorboviceras.
