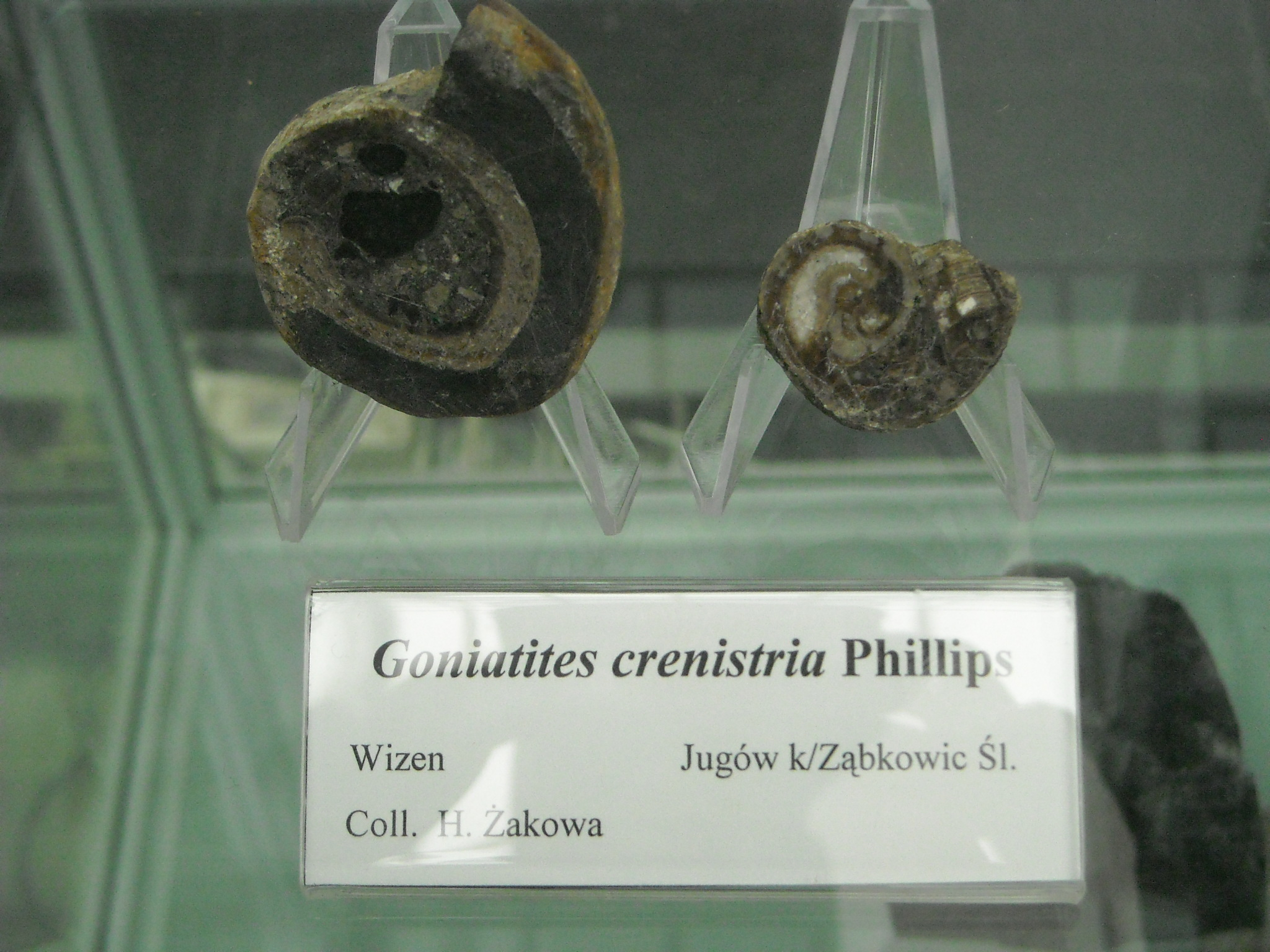
- Fossil of Goniatites crenistria from Poland

Scientific classification
- Domain: Eukaryota
- Kingdom: Animalia
- Phylum: Mollusca
- Class: Cephalopoda
- Subclass: †Ammonoidea
- Order: †Goniatitida
- Family: †Goniatitidae
- Genus: †Goniatites
- Species: †G. crenistria

Binomial name
- †Goniatites crenistria Phillips, 1836

= Goniatites crenistria =

Goniatites crenistria Temporal range: Carboniferous 345.3–326.4 Ma

Species of mollusc

Goniatites crenistria is a species of extinct cephalopods belonging to the family Goniatitidae, included in the superfamily Goniatitaceae.

These fast-moving nektonic carnivores lived in the Carboniferous from 345.3 to 326.4 Ma.
