= Dombarites =

Scientific classification
- Kingdom: Animalia
- Phylum: Mollusca
- Class: Cephalopoda
- Subclass: †Ammonoidea
- Order: †Goniatitida
- Family: †Agathiceratidae
- Genus: †Dombarites

Genus of molluscs (fossil)

Dombarites is a genus belonging to the goniatitid family Agathiceratidae; extinct ammonoids which are shelled cephalopods more closely related to squid, octopus and other coleoids than to the superficially similar Nautilus.

According to Saunders, et al., 1999, Dombarites from the middle and upper Lower Carboniferous (Mississippian) is the earliest of the Agathiceratidae; gave rise to Perclietes and Proshumardites in the late Early Carboniferous and indirectly to Agathiceras which first appeared in the middle Upper Carboniferous (Pennsylvanian). Dombarites is derived from Goniatites, a genus in the Goniatitidae, in the middle Early Carboniferous.
