= Agathiceras anceps =

Agathiceras anceps Temporal range: 268.0–265.0 Ma

Scientific classification
- Domain: Eukaryota
- Kingdom: Animalia
- Phylum: Mollusca
- Class: Cephalopoda
- Subclass: †Ammonoidea
- Order: †Goniatitida
- Family: †Agathiceratidae
- Genus: †Agathiceras
- Species: †A. anceps

Binomial name
- †Agathiceras anceps Gemmellaro 1887

Extinct species of mollusc

Agathiceras anceps is a species of Agathiceras, named by Gemmellaro in 1887.

The mollusc was a fast moving nektonic carnivore and had a typical shell width of 11mm and diameter of 17 mm.
