= Surenitidae =

Scientific classification
- Kingdom: Animalia
- Phylum: Mollusca
- Class: Cephalopoda
- Subclass: †Ammonoidea
- Order: †Goniatitida
- Superfamily: †Gastrioceratoidea
- Family: †Surenitidae; Librovitch 1957

Genera
- Aphantites; Gaitherites; Marianoceras; Melvilloceras; Surenites; Ugamites; Verneuilites

Extinct family of molluscs

Surenitidae is one of five families of the Gastrioceratoidea superfamily. They are an extinct group of ammonoid, which are shelled cephalopods related to squids, belemnites, octopuses, and cuttlefish, and more distantly to the nautiloids.
