= Agathiceras applini =

Agathiceras applini Temporal range: 290.1–279.5 Ma

Scientific classification
- Domain: Eukaryota
- Kingdom: Animalia
- Phylum: Mollusca
- Class: Cephalopoda
- Subclass: †Ammonoidea
- Order: †Goniatitida
- Family: †Agathiceratidae
- Genus: †Agathiceras
- Species: †A. applini

Binomial name
- †Agathiceras applini Plummer and Scott 1937

Extinct species of mollusc

Agathiceras applini is a species of Agathiceras, named by Plummer and Scott in 1937.

The mollusc was a fast moving nektonic carnivore and had an average shell width of 6.23 mm and shell diameter of 9.54 mm.
