= Arkanites =

Arkanites Temporal range: Lower Pennsylvanian

Scientific classification
- Domain: Eukaryota
- Kingdom: Animalia
- Phylum: Mollusca
- Class: Cephalopoda
- Subclass: †Ammonoidea
- Order: †Goniatitida
- Family: †Reticuloceratidae
- Genus: †Arkanites; McCaleb et al., 1964
- Species: †A. relictus

Binomial name
- †Arkanites relictus (Quinn et al., 1962)

Synonyms
- Species synonymy: Eumorphoceras relictum Quinn et al., 1962

Extinct genus of molluscs

Arkanites is a goniatitid ammonite that lived during the Early Pennsylvanian that has been found in Arkansas and Oklahoma in the U.S.

== Morphology ==
The shell of Arkanites is subglobose, rather evolute, with a moderately wide umbilicus and a broadly rounded venter (or rim). Sculpture consists of well developed umbilical ribbing, sometimes with nodelike bases, and broad, deep, ventrolateral grooves. The ventral lobe of the suture, which sits on the outer rim, is large, with a median saddle that exceeds half its overall height. The first lateral saddle is broadly rounded, the adventitious lobe is large and pointed.

== Taxonomy ==
Arkanites is possibly derived from Retites and closely related to Quinnites, all which come from the Lower Pennsylvanian (Morrowan). Retites and Quinnites are found together in Arkansas; Arkanites separately in Arkansas and Oklahoma. Retites has also been reported from the southern Urals of Russia and from Inner Mongolia, China.
