= Lyrogoniatitinae =

Scientific classification
- Kingdom: Animalia
- Phylum: Mollusca
- Class: Cephalopoda
- Subclass: †Ammonoidea
- Order: †Goniatitida
- Family: †Cravenoceratidae
- Subfamily: †Lyrogoniatitinae; Ruzhencev & Bogoslovskaya 1971

Genera
- Caenolyroceras; Lyrogoniatites; Pachylyroceras; Verancoceras

Extinct subfamily of molluscs

Lyrogoniatitinae is one of two subfamilies of the family Cravenoceratidae. They are an extinct group of ammonoid, which are shelled cephalopods related to squids, belemnites, octopuses, and cuttlefish, and more distantly to the nautiloids.
