= Decoritidae =

Scientific classification
- Kingdom: Animalia
- Phylum: Mollusca
- Class: Cephalopoda
- Subclass: †Ammonoidea
- Order: †Goniatitida
- Superfamily: †Gastrioceratoidea
- Family: †Decoritidae; Ruzhencev & Bogoslovskaya 1975

Genera
- Brevikites; Decorites; Kushanites

Extinct family of molluscs

Decoritidae is one of five families of the Gastrioceratoidea superfamily. They are an extinct group of ammonoid, which are shelled cephalopods related to squids, belemnites, octopuses, and cuttlefish, and more distantly to the nautiloids.
