= Dombarigloria =

Scientific classification
- Domain: Eukaryota
- Kingdom: Animalia
- Phylum: Mollusca
- Class: Cephalopoda
- Subclass: †Ammonoidea
- Order: †Goniatitida
- Family: †Cravenoceratidae
- Subfamily: †Cravenoceratinae
- Genus: †Dombarigloria; Ruzhentzev & Bogoslovskaya, 1971

Genus of molluscs (fossil)

Dombarigloria is a genus belonging to the goniatitid family Cravenoceratidae; extinct ammonoids which are shelled cephalopods more closely related to squid, octopus and other coleoids than to the superficially similar Nautilus

Dombarigloria (Saunders et al. 1999) one of the three earliest genera in the Cravenoceratidae, appearing in the middle Lower Carboniferous (Mississippian). Dombarigloria is derived from the cravenoceratid Pachylyroceras.
