= Bilinguites =

Scientific classification
- Kingdom: Animalia
- Phylum: Mollusca
- Class: Cephalopoda
- Subclass: †Ammonoidea
- Order: †Goniatitida
- Family: †Reticuloceratidae
- Subfamily: †Reticuloceratinae
- Genus: †Bilinguites; Librovitch, 1946

Genus of molluscs (fossil)

Bilinguites is a genus belonging to the Gastrioceratoidea superfamily. They are an extinct group of ammonoid, which are shelled cephalopods related to squids, belemnites, octopuses, and cuttlefish, and more distantly to the nautiloids.
