= Agathiceras applanatum =

Agathiceras applanatum Temporal range: 272.5–268.0 Ma

Scientific classification
- Domain: Eukaryota
- Kingdom: Animalia
- Phylum: Mollusca
- Class: Cephalopoda
- Subclass: †Ammonoidea
- Order: †Goniatitida
- Family: †Agathiceratidae
- Genus: †Agathiceras
- Species: †A. applanatum

Binomial name
- †Agathiceras applanatum Teichert 1944

Extinct species of mollusc

Agathiceras applanatum is a species of Agathiceras, named by Teichert in 1944.

The mollusc was a fast moving nektonic carnivore and had an average shell width of 8.5 mm and shell diameter of 18.8 mm.
