= Umbetoceras =

Umbetoceras Temporal range: Carboniferous

Scientific classification
- Domain: Eukaryota
- Kingdom: Animalia
- Phylum: Mollusca
- Class: Cephalopoda
- Subclass: †Ammonoidea
- Order: †Goniatitida
- Family: †Homoceratidae
- Genus: †Umbetoceras; Ruzhencev and Bogoslovskaya, 1971

Genus of molluscs (fossil)

Umbetoceras is an extinct group of marine molluscs. The genus belongs to the goniatitid superfamily Gastrioceratoidea and family Homoceratidae; with examples being found in carboniferous deposits in the Russian Federation and Uzbekistan.

The shell of Umbetoceras is involute in the adult, with an evolute early stage and moderately wide umbilicus. Sculpture consists of strong riblets on intermediate stages with tubercles present on umbilical shoulder. The suture has a wide double pronged ventral lobe with a median saddle that exceeds two thirds its height.
