= Nuculoceratidae =

Scientific classification
- Kingdom: Animalia
- Phylum: Mollusca
- Class: Cephalopoda
- Subclass: †Ammonoidea
- Order: †Goniatitida
- Superfamily: †Neoglyphioceratoidea
- Family: †Nuculoceratidae; Ruzhencev 1957

Genera
- Nuculoceras

Extinct family of molluscs

Nuculoceratidae is one of six families of the Neoglyphioceratoidea superfamily. They are an extinct group of ammonoid, which are shelled cephalopods related to squids, belemnites, octopuses, and cuttlefish, and more distantly to the nautiloids.
