= Agathiceras =

Scientific classification
- Kingdom: Animalia
- Phylum: Mollusca
- Class: Cephalopoda
- Subclass: †Ammonoidea
- Order: †Goniatitida
- Family: †Agathiceratidae
- Genus: †Agathiceras; Gemmellaro, 1887

Genus of molluscs (fossil)

Agathiceras is a subglobose goniatitid from the family Agathiceratidae, widespread and locally abundant in Lower Pennsylvanian to Middle Permian sediments, e.g. the Urals, Sicily, and Texas (Blaine Formation).

Agathiceras, named by Gemmellaro in 1887 from the Middle Permian Sicilian species, A. suessi, has a broadly rounded outer edge, known as the venter, being at the lower side of the animal during life, and a deeply impressed innerside, the dorsum which corresponds with the back or dorsal side of the animal. The sutures are goniatitic with three lateral and one dorsolateral lobes on either side. Those that are external are spatulate, those hidden are V-shaped. The siphuncle is primitive with the septal necks pointing to the rear, a condition known as retrosiphonate.

Agathiceras is thought to be derived from Proshumardites according to Saunders et al. (1999), which is thought to be derived from Dombarites; all of which are included in the Agathiceratidae. Dombarites is presumed to have its origin in Goniatites, type genus of the Goniatitidae

== Species ==
- Agathiceras anceps
- Agathiceras applanatum
- Agathiceras applini
- Agathiceras ciscoense
- Agathiceras contractum
- Agathiceras divisum
- Agathiceras frechi
- Agathiceras girtyi
- Agathiceras jilinense
- Agathiceras mediterraneum
- Agathiceras sequaxilirae
- Agathiceras suessi
- Agathiceras sundaicum
- Agathiceras tornatum
- Agathiceras uralicum
- Agathiceras verkhoyanicum
- Agathiceras vulgatum
