= Fayettevilleidae =

Scientific classification
- Kingdom: Animalia
- Phylum: Mollusca
- Class: Cephalopoda
- Subclass: †Ammonoidea
- Order: †Goniatitida
- Superfamily: †Neoglyphioceratoidea
- Family: †Fayettevilleidae; Ruzhencev & Bogoslovskaya 1971

Genera
- Chumazites; Fayettevillea; Pseudofayettevillea; Zidadarites

Extinct family of molluscs

Fayettevilleidae is one of six families of the Neoglyphioceratoidea superfamily. They are an extinct group of ammonoid, which are shelled cephalopods related to squids, belemnites, octopuses, and cuttlefish, and more distantly to the nautiloids.
