= Cancelloceras =

Cancelloceras Temporal range: 318.1–314 Ma

Scientific classification
- Domain: Eukaryota
- Kingdom: Animalia
- Phylum: Mollusca
- Class: Cephalopoda
- Subclass: †Ammonoidea
- Order: †Goniatitida
- Family: †Gastrioceratidae
- Genus: †Cancelloceras; Ruzhencev and Bogoslovskaya, 1969

Species
- †Cancelloceras (Monitoceras); †Cancelloceras asianum; †Cancelloceras bisati; †Cancelloceras contractum; †Cancelloceras dilatatum; †Cancelloceras elegans; †Cancelloceras extenuatum; †Cancelloceras fragosum; †Cancelloceras huntsvillense; †Cancelloceras parasianum; †Cancelloceras rurae

Genus of molluscs (fossil)

Cancelloceras is an extinct genus of ammonites in the family Gastrioceratidae. Species are from the Carboniferous.

†Cancelloceras elegans Ruzhentsev and Bogoslovskaya 1978 is from the Carboniferous of the Russian Federation, Nevada (United States) and Uzbekistan.

== See also ==
- List of ammonite genera
