= Sygambritinae =

Scientific classification
- Domain: Eukaryota
- Kingdom: Animalia
- Phylum: Mollusca
- Class: Cephalopoda
- Subclass: †Ammonoidea
- Order: †Goniatitida
- Family: †Goniatitidae
- Subfamily: †Sygambritinae

Genera
- Sygambrites

Sygambritinae is one of two subfamilies of the Goniatitidae family. They are an extinct group of ammonoid, which are shelled cephalopods related to squids, belemnites, octopuses, and cuttlefish, and more distantly to the nautiloids.
