= Reticuloceratidae =

Reticuloceratidae Temporal range: Pennsylvanian 317.0–313.0 Ma
- Reticuloceras guizhouense, Shanghai Natural History Museum

Scientific classification
- Kingdom: Animalia
- Phylum: Mollusca
- Class: Cephalopoda
- Subclass: †Ammonoidea
- Order: †Goniatitida
- Superfamily: †Gastrioceratoidea
- Family: †Reticuloceratidae; Librovitch 1957

Subfamilies
- Reticuloceratinae; Surenitinae

Extinct family of molluscs

Reticuloceratidae is one of five families of the Gastrioceratoidea superfamily. They are an extinct group of ammonoid, which are shelled cephalopods related to squids, belemnites, octopuses, and cuttlefish, and more distantly to the nautiloids.

== Taxonomy ==
Family consists of 2 valid subfamilies:

- Reticuloceratidae

- Reticuloceratinae

- Agastrioceras
- Alurites
- Aphantites
- Arkanites
- Bilinguites
- Phillipsoceras
- Quinnites
- Reticuloceras
- Retites
- Tectiretites

- Surenitinae

- Gaitherites
- Marianoceras
- Melvilloceras
- Surenites
- Ugamites
- Verneuilites
