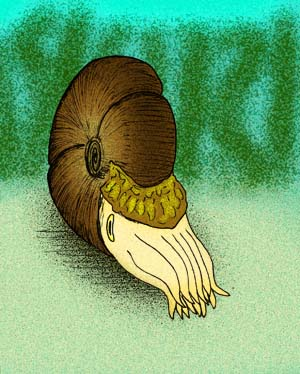
- A. rhipaeum

Scientific classification
- Kingdom: Animalia
- Phylum: Mollusca
- Class: Cephalopoda
- Subclass: †Ammonoidea
- Order: †Goniatitida
- Family: †Cravenoceratidae (?)
- Subfamily: †Cravenoceratinae (?)
- Genus: †Aenigmatoceras

species
- A. rhipaeum (type species); A. kyzylkumense

= Aenigmatoceras =

Aenigmatoceras Temporal range: Carboniferous

Genus of molluscs (fossil)

Aenigmatoceras is a genus of ammonite cephalopods from the Carboniferous of Russia. It is tentatively placed within the family Cravenoceratidae based on similarities with Tympanoceras.
