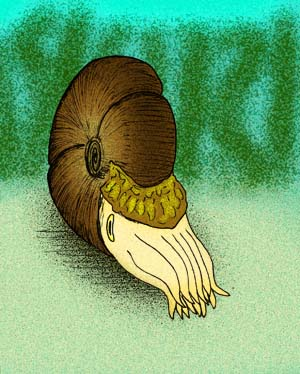
- Aenigmatoceras rhipaeum

Scientific classification
- Kingdom: Animalia
- Phylum: Mollusca
- Class: Cephalopoda
- Subclass: †Ammonoidea
- Order: †Goniatitida
- Family: †Cravenoceratidae
- Subfamily: †Cravenoceratinae; Ruzhencev, 1957

Genera
- Aenigmatoceras; Alaoceras; Collectoceras; Cravenoceras; Dombarigloria; Emstites; Gorboviceras; Kardailites; Lechroceras; Quasicravenoceras; Tympanoceras

= Cravenoceratinae =

Extinct subfamily of molluscs

Cravenoceratinae is one of two subfamilies of the family Cravenoceratidae. They are an extinct group of ammonoid, which are shelled cephalopods related to squids, belemnites, octopuses, and cuttlefish, and more distantly to the nautiloids.
