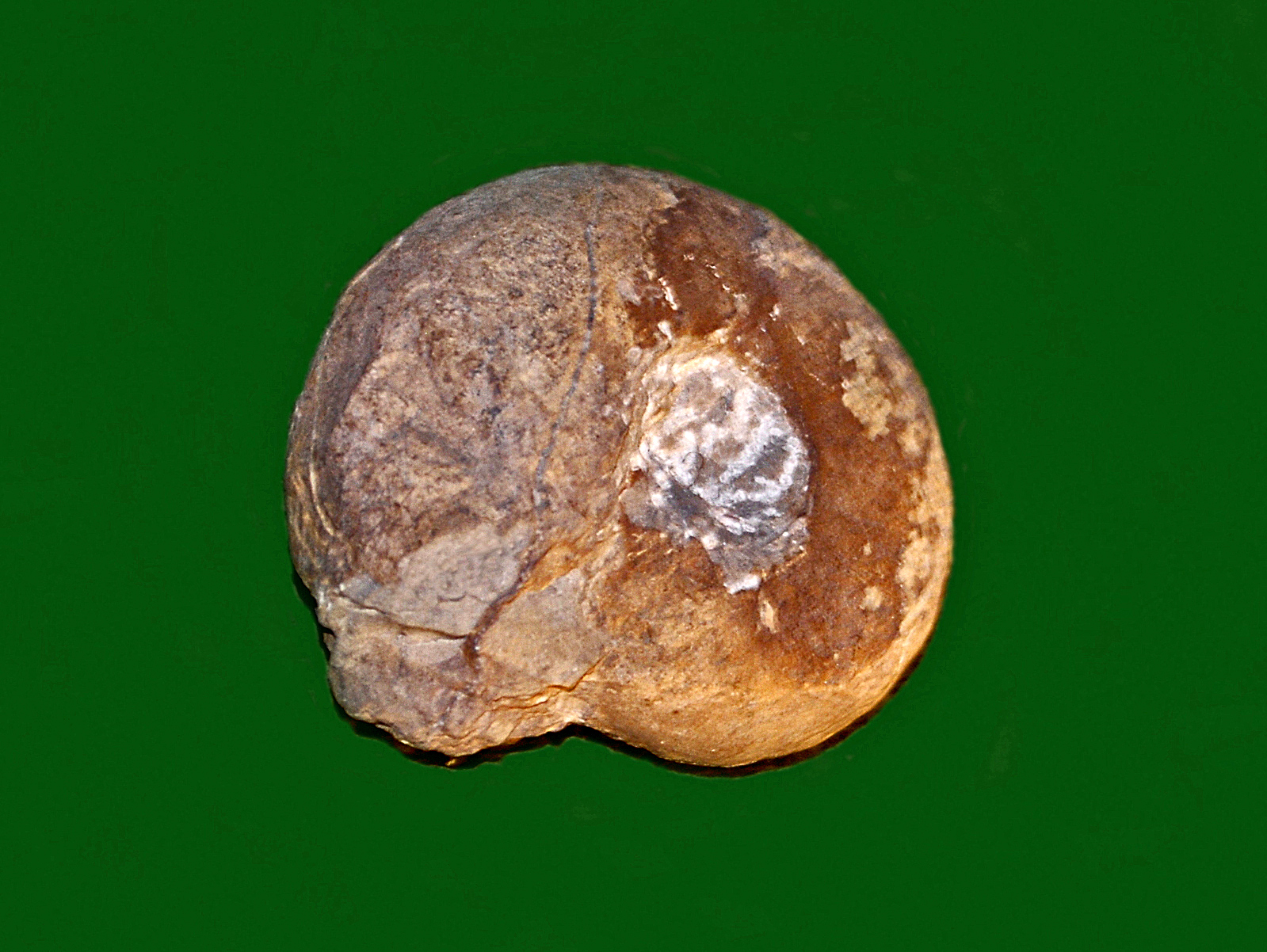
- Fossil of Goniatites bohemicus from Bavaria, on display at Galerie de paléontologie et d'anatomie comparée in Paris

Scientific classification
- Domain: Eukaryota
- Kingdom: Animalia
- Phylum: Mollusca
- Class: Cephalopoda
- Subclass: †Ammonoidea
- Order: †Goniatitida
- Family: †Goniatitidae
- Genus: †Goniatites
- Species: †G. bohemicus

Binomial name
- †Goniatites bohemicus Barrande 1865

= Goniatites bohemicus =

Goniatites bohemicus Temporal range: Mississippian

Species of mollusc

Goniatites bohemicus is a species of extinct cephalopods belonging to the family Goniatitidae, included in the superfamily Goniatitaceae.

These slow-moving nektonic carnivores lived in the Mississippian epoch during the Carboniferous period in what is now Bohemia.
