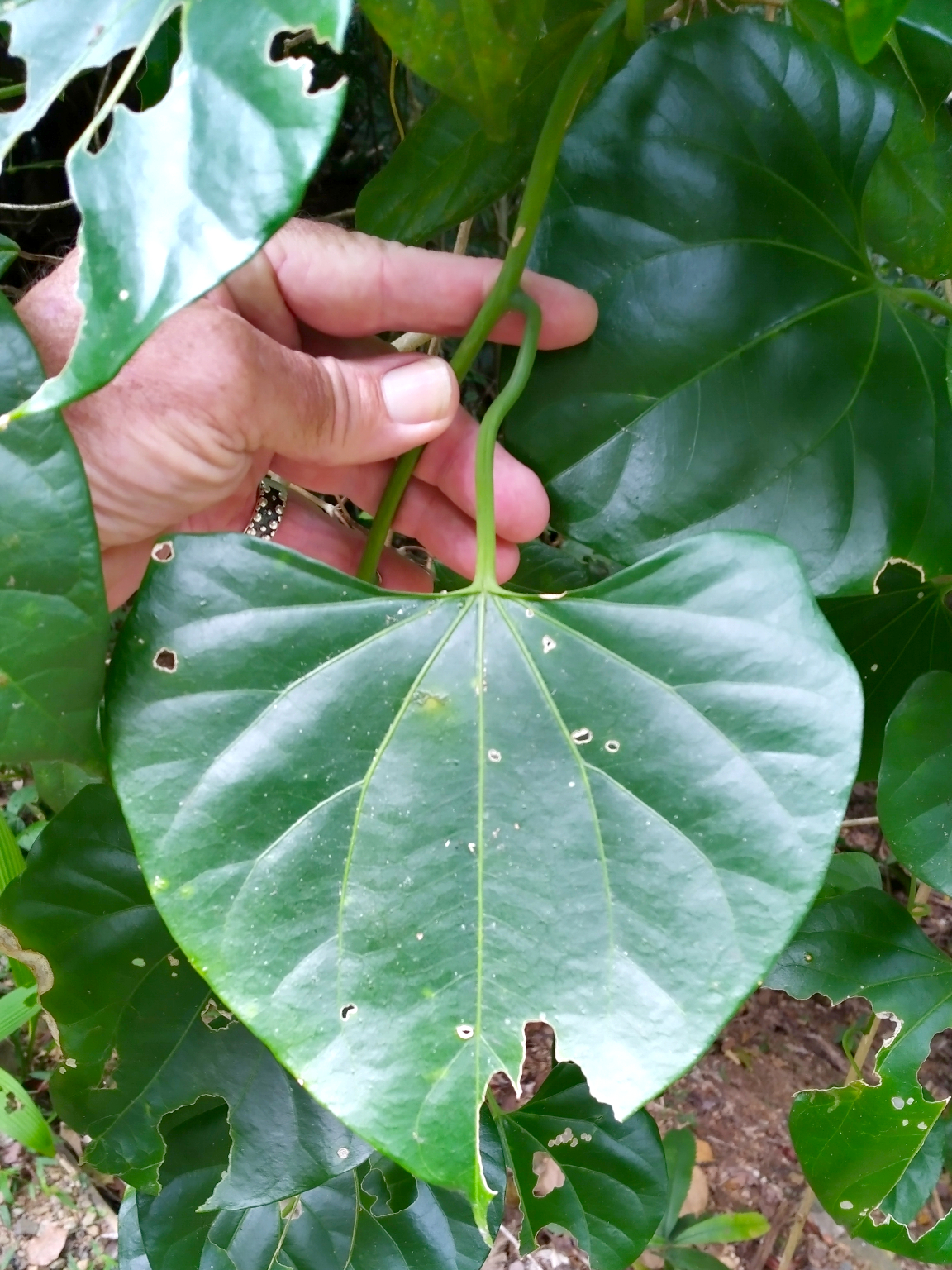
- Leaf
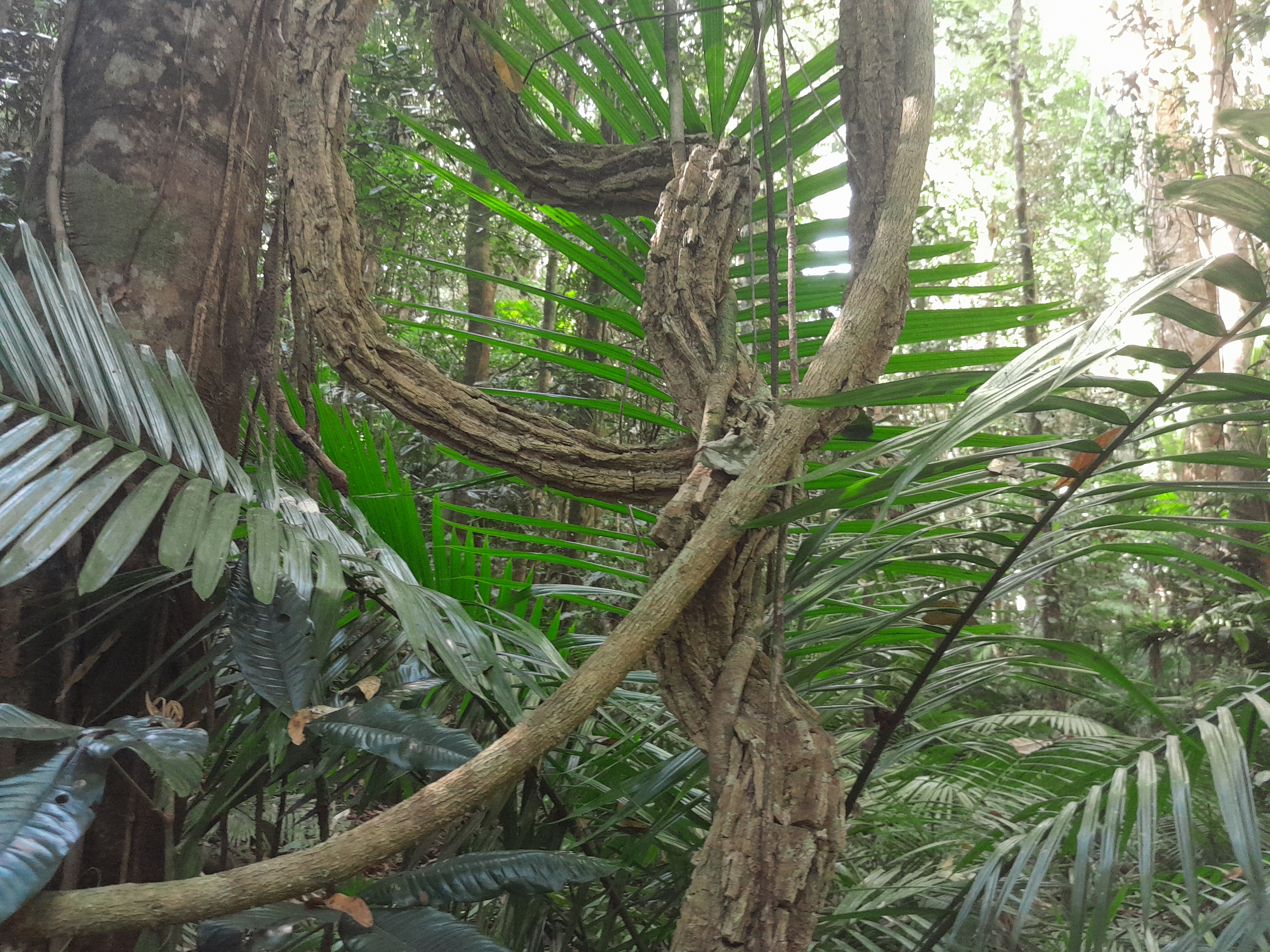
- Corky stem

Conservation status
- Special Least Concern (NCA)

Scientific classification
- Kingdom: Plantae
- Clade: Tracheophytes
- Clade: Angiosperms
- Clade: Eudicots
- Clade: Asterids
- Order: Aquifoliales
- Family: Cardiopteridaceae
- Genus: Cardiopteris
- Species: C. moluccana

Binomial name
- Cardiopteris moluccana Blume

Synonyms
- Cardiopteris lobata var. moluccana (Blume) Mast.; Peripterygium moluccanum (Blume) Sleumer; Cardiopteris rumphii var. blumeana Baill.; Cardiopteris rumphii var. intermedia Baill.; Aspidocarya kelidophylla K.Schum. & Lauterb.

= Cardiopteris moluccana =

Species of flowering plant

Cardiopteris moluccana, commonly known as blood vine, is a climbing plant in the citronella family Cardiopteridaceae native to areas from the Philippines south to Queensland, Australia. It is a twining vine with a stem diameter up to 12 cm (4.7 in). The outer bark has deep, longitudinal corky ridges and the leaves are usually hastate. It was first described by Dutch botanist Carl Ludwig Blume in 1847.

== Distribution and habitat ==
The native range of Cardiopteris moluccana is the Philippines, Sulawesi, the Maluku Islands, New Guinea, the Bismarck Archipelago, the Solomon Islands and Queensland. In Australia it occurs on the east coast from around Rossville to about Ingham, and inhabits in rainforest from sea level to about 700 m (2,300 ft).

== Conservation ==
This species is listed as "special least concern" under the Queensland Government's Nature Conservation Act, a rating that lies between "least concern" and "near threatened". As of 9 December 2024, it has not been assessed by the International Union for Conservation of Nature (IUCN).
