= Quinnites =

Quinnites Temporal range: Carboniferous

Scientific classification
- Domain: Eukaryota
- Kingdom: Animalia
- Phylum: Mollusca
- Class: Cephalopoda
- Subclass: †Ammonoidea
- Order: †Goniatitida
- Family: †Reticuloceratidae
- Subfamily: †Reticuloceratinae
- Genus: †Quinnites; Manger and Saunders, 1980

Genus of molluscs (fossil)

Quinnites is a genus of goniatitid ammonites included in the gastrioceratoidean family Reticuloceratidae known from the Carboniferous of the state of Arkansas, USA.

== Description ==
Quinnites can be recognized by its thickly discoidal shell with a wide umbilicus and double pronged ventral lobe with a median saddle about half as high as the entire lobe. Umbilical ribs are common. May have spiral ornamentation, constrictions, or ventral groove.

== Taxonomy ==
Quinnites, named by Manger and Saunders 1980, contains two species, Quinnites henbesti and Quinnites textum, both removed from Gastrioceras (Branneroceras).
