= Gastrioceras =

Gastrioceras Temporal range: Late Carb- Perm

Scientific classification
- Kingdom: Animalia
- Phylum: Mollusca
- Class: Cephalopoda
- Subclass: †Ammonoidea
- Order: †Goniatitida
- Family: †Gastrioceratidae
- Genus: †Gastrioceras; Hyatt, 1884

Genus of molluscs (fossil)

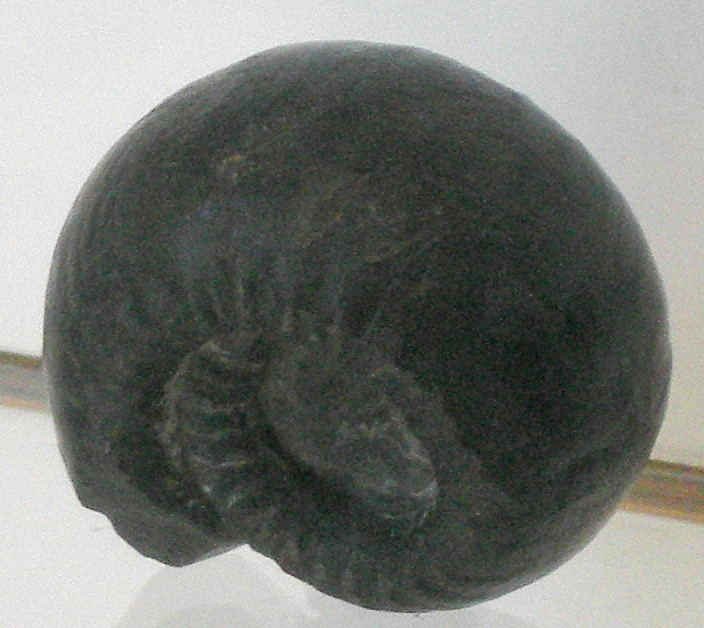
Gastrioceras species fossil

Gastrioceras is a goniatitid genus in the family Gastrioceratidae that lived during the late Carboniferous (Pennsylvanian and for most of the Permian.

== Taxonomy ==
Gastrioceras is assigned to the Gastrioceratidae, a family that makes up part of the Gastriocerataceae, known in more recent references as Gastrioceratoidea. ,

== Morphology ==
The Gastrioceras shell, or conch, is subdiscoidal to subglobose in form with moderate to wide umbilicus. Ornament varies according to species, varying from simple transverse lirae to reticulate produced by the addition of faint longitudinal lirae. The umbilical shoulder is nodose, nodes elongated transversely. Some species have rather strong ribs.

The suture is characterized by a ventral lobe with two attenuated prongs separated by a high median saddle. The lateral lobe is generally nearly symmetrical, becoming attenuated on mature specimens.
