= Homoceratidae =

Scientific classification
- Kingdom: Animalia
- Phylum: Mollusca
- Class: Cephalopoda
- Subclass: †Ammonoidea
- Order: †Goniatitida
- Superfamily: †Gastrioceratoidea
- Family: †Homoceratidae; Spath 1934

Genera
- Aljezurites; Bashkortoceras; Bogdanoceras; Fallacites; Homoceras; Isohomoceras; Parahomoceras; Umbetoceras; Vallites

Extinct family of molluscs

Homoceratidae is one of five families of the Gastrioceratoidea superfamily. They are an extinct group of ammonoid, which are shelled cephalopods related to squids, belemnites, octopuses, and cuttlefish, and more distantly to the nautiloids.
