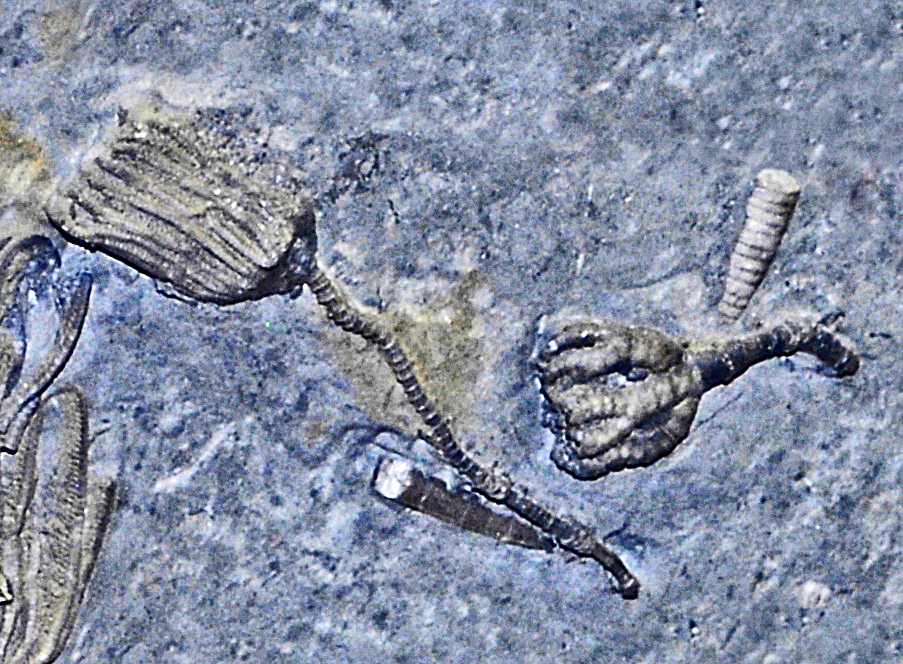
- Fossil of Taxocrinus species (on the right)

Scientific classification
- Kingdom: Animalia
- Phylum: Echinodermata
- Class: Crinoidea
- Order: †Taxocrinida
- Family: †Taxocrinidae
- Genus: †Taxocrinus; Phillips, 1843

= Taxocrinus =

Taxocrinus Temporal range: Silurian - Carboniferous

Extinct genus of crinoids

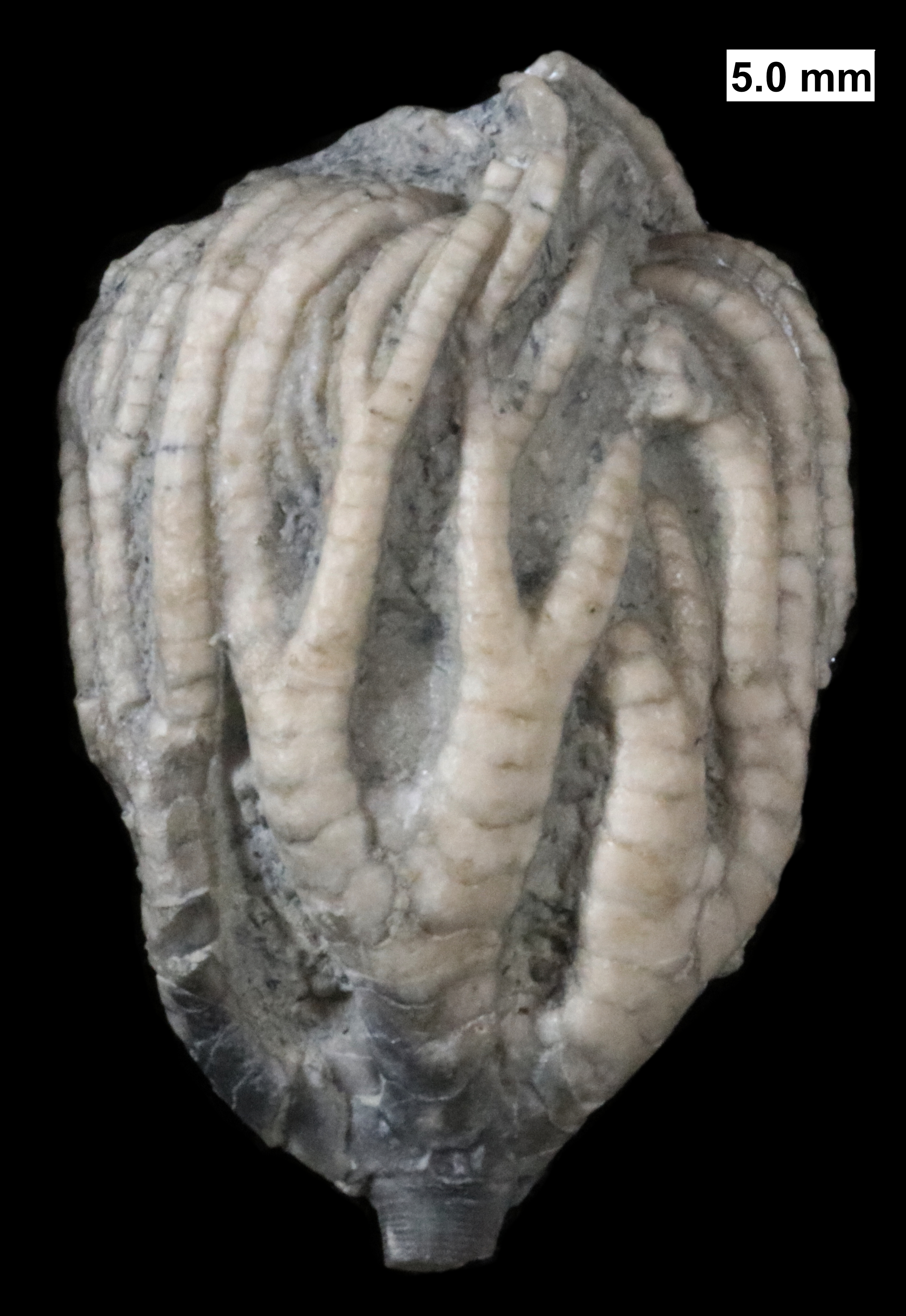
Crown of the crinoid Taxocrinus telleri, from the Middle Devonian of Wisconsin.

Taxocrinus is an extinct genus of crinoids.

== Fossil records ==
This genus is known in the fossil record from the Silurian period to the Carboniferous period (age range: from 428.2 to 326.4 million years ago). These fossils have been found in United Kingdom, United States, Australia, China, the Czech Republic and Germany.

== Species ==
- Taxocrinus anomalus Waters et al. 2003
- Taxocrinus macrodactylus Phillips 1841
- Taxocrinus stultus Whidborne 1896
- Taxocrinus telleri Springer, 1920
