= Solenomorpha =

Solenomorpha Temporal range: Late Ordovician – Late Triassic

Scientific classification
- Kingdom: Animalia
- Phylum: Mollusca
- Class: Bivalvia
- Subterclass: Euheterodonta
- Order: incertae sedis
- Superfamily: †Orthonotoidea
- Family: †Solenomorphidae; T. D. A. Cockerell, 1915
- Genus: †Solenomorpha; T. D. A. Cockerell, 1903

Species
- †Solenomorpha minor (McCoy, 1844); †Solenomorpha korlaensis Z.-R. Yang, 1983 uncertain, unassessed; †Solenomorpha moriensis Z.-R. Yang, 1983 uncertain, unassessed; †Solenomorpha tianshanensis Z.-R. Yang, 1983 uncertain, unassessed

Synonyms
- †Solenopsis McCoy, 1844 junior homonym of Solenopsis Westwood, 1840 [Hymenoptera]; Solenomorpha is a replacement name

Extinct genus of bivalves

Solenomorpha is an extinct genus of bivalve molluscs that lived from the Late Ordovician to the Late Triassic in Australia, Europe, and North America.
