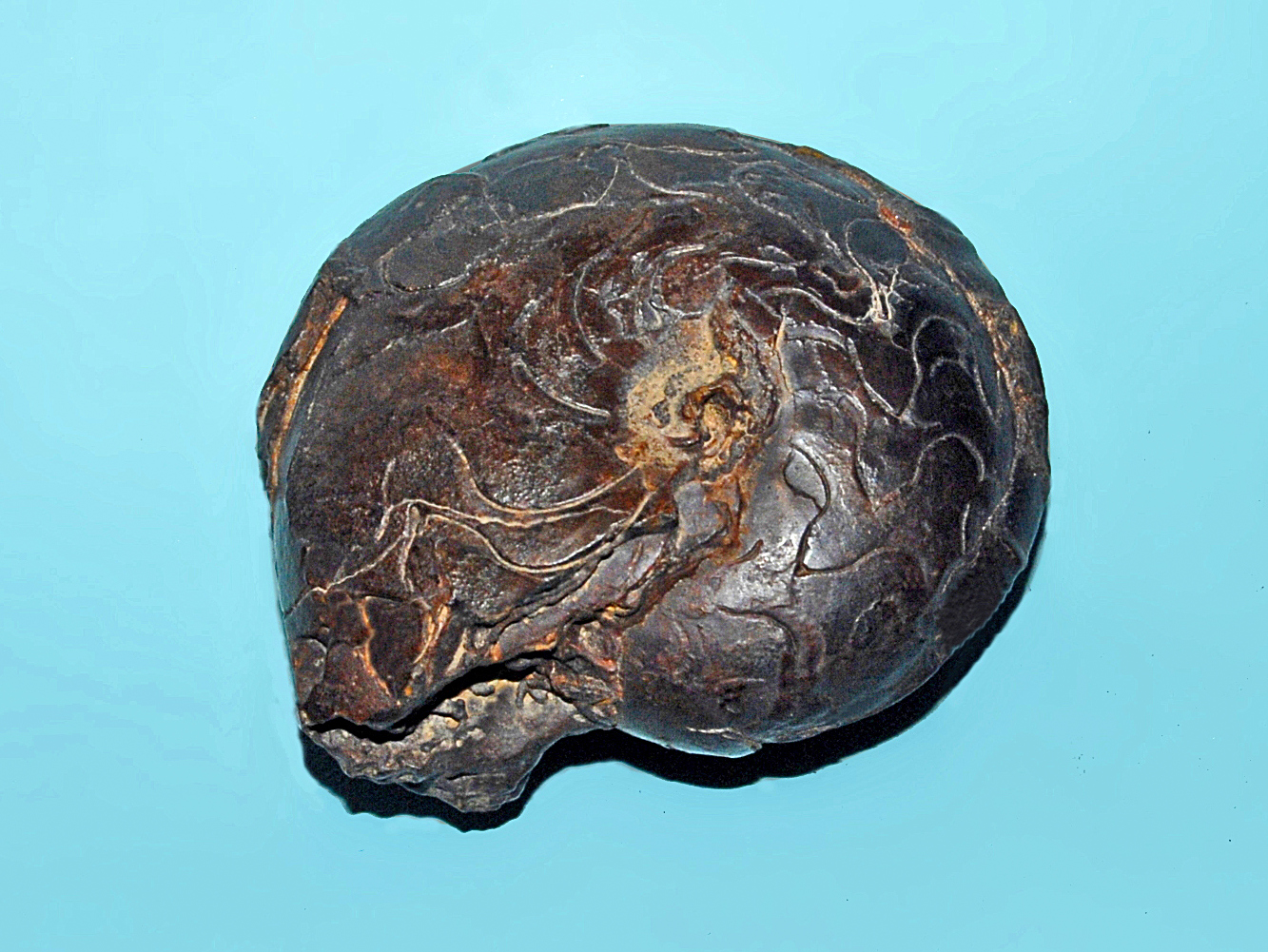
- Fossil of Goniatites species

Scientific classification
- Domain: Eukaryota
- Kingdom: Animalia
- Phylum: Mollusca
- Class: Cephalopoda
- Subclass: †Ammonoidea
- Order: †Goniatitida
- Family: †Goniatitidae
- Subfamily: †Goniatitinae
- Genus: †Goniatites; De Haan, 1825

Species
- See text

= Goniatites =

Goniatites Temporal range: from Late Devonian to Late Triassic, 409.1–205.6 Ma

Extinct genus of molluscs

Goniatites is a genus of extinct cephalopods belonging to the family Goniatitidae, included in the superfamily Goniatitaceae. Hibernicoceras and Hypergoniatites are among related genera.

== Species ==
- Goniatites aequilobatus Klipstein, 1843
- Goniatites americanus Gordon, 1971
- Goniatites amarensis Korn & Ebbighausen, 2025
- Goniatites beaumontii Klipstein, 1843
- Goniatites bidorsatus Klipstein, 1843
- Goniatites blumii Klipstein, 1843
- Goniatites bohemicus Barrande, 1865
- Goniatites bronnii Klipstein, 1843
- Goniatites buchii Klipstein, 1843
- Goniatites choctawensis Shumard, 1863
- Goniatites crenistria Phillips, 1836
- Goniatites deceptus Korn and Titus, 2011
- Goniatites dufrenoii Klipstein, 1843
- Goniatites eganensis Korn and Titus, 2011
- Goniatites friesei Münster, 1841
- Goniatites furcatus Münster, 1841
- Goniatites glaucus Münster, 1841
- Goniatites granosus Portlock, 1843
- Goniatites greencastlensis Miller and Gurley, 1896
- Goniatites infrafurcatus Klipstein, 1843
- Goniatites iris Klipstein, 1843
- Goniatites kentuckiensis Miller, 1889
- Goniatites lineatus Miller and Gurley, 1896
- Goniatites nitidus Phillips, 1836
- Goniatites pisum Münster, 1841
- Goniatites radiatus Klipstein, 1843
- Goniatites rosthornii Klipstein, 1843
- Goniatites sowerbyi Korn and Titus, 2011
- Goniatites sphaericus Martin, 1809
- Goniatites spurius Münster, 1841
- Goniatites striatus Sowerby, 1814
- Goniatites subcircularis Miller, 1889
- Goniatites suprafurcatus Klipstein, 1843
- Goniatites tenuissimus Klipstein, 1843
- Goniatites wissmanni Münster, 1841

== Description ==
The shell is generally globose with an open but narrow umbilicus, the surface commonly reticulate resulting from longitudinal lirae crossing transverse striae. The ventral lobe of the suture is rather narrow with a median saddle about or little less than half the height of entire lobe. The first lateral saddle is subangular to angular.

== Distribution ==
Fossils of species within this genus have been found widespread in North America, Eurasia, and north Africa. In particular they have been found in the Triassic of Italy, United States, in the Permian of United States, in the Carboniferous of the Czech Republic, Germany, Ireland, Morocco, United Kingdom, United States, in the Mississippian of United States, as well in the Devonian of the Czech Republic, Spain, United States.

== Gallery ==
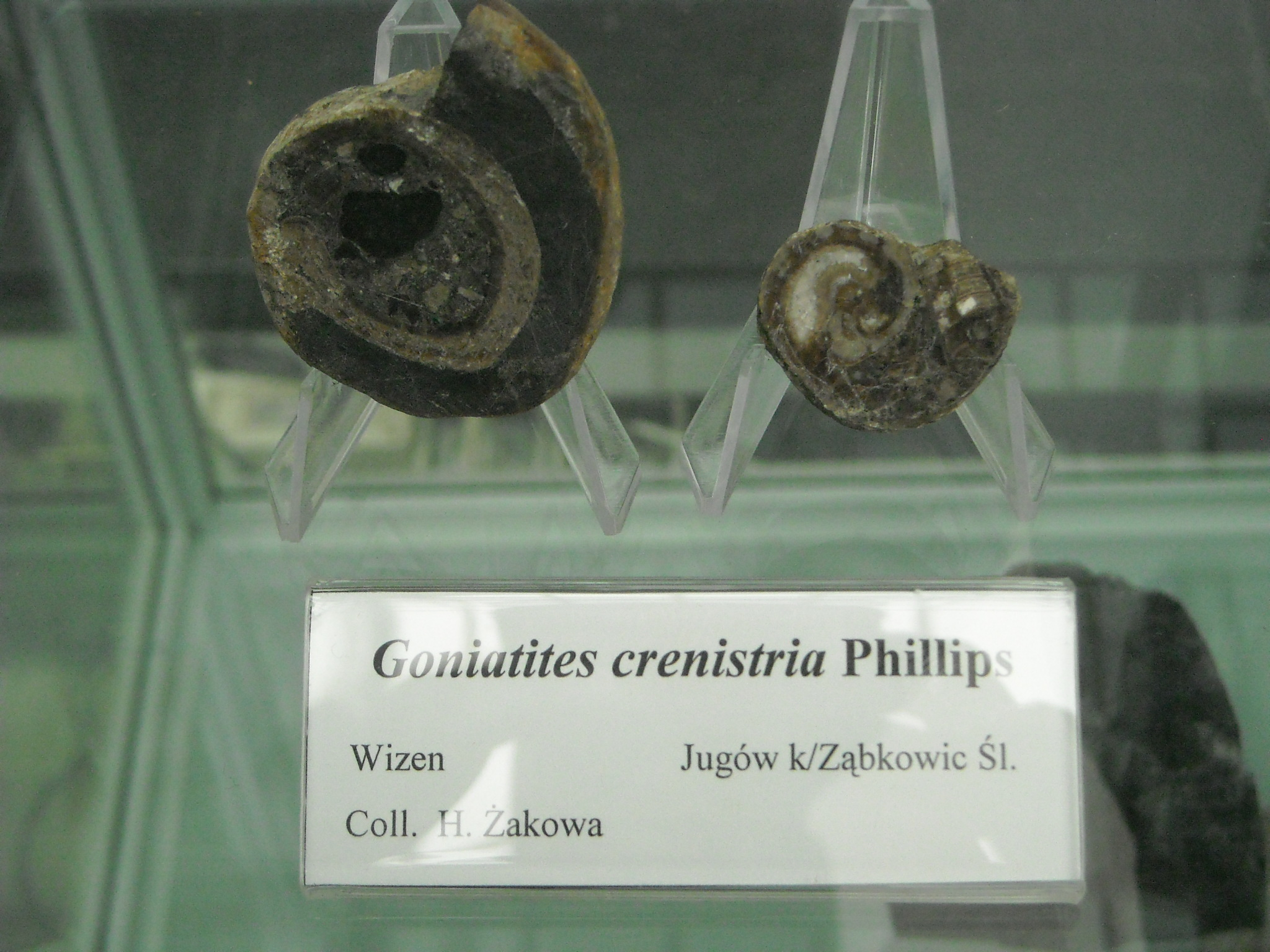
Goniatites crenistria from Poland

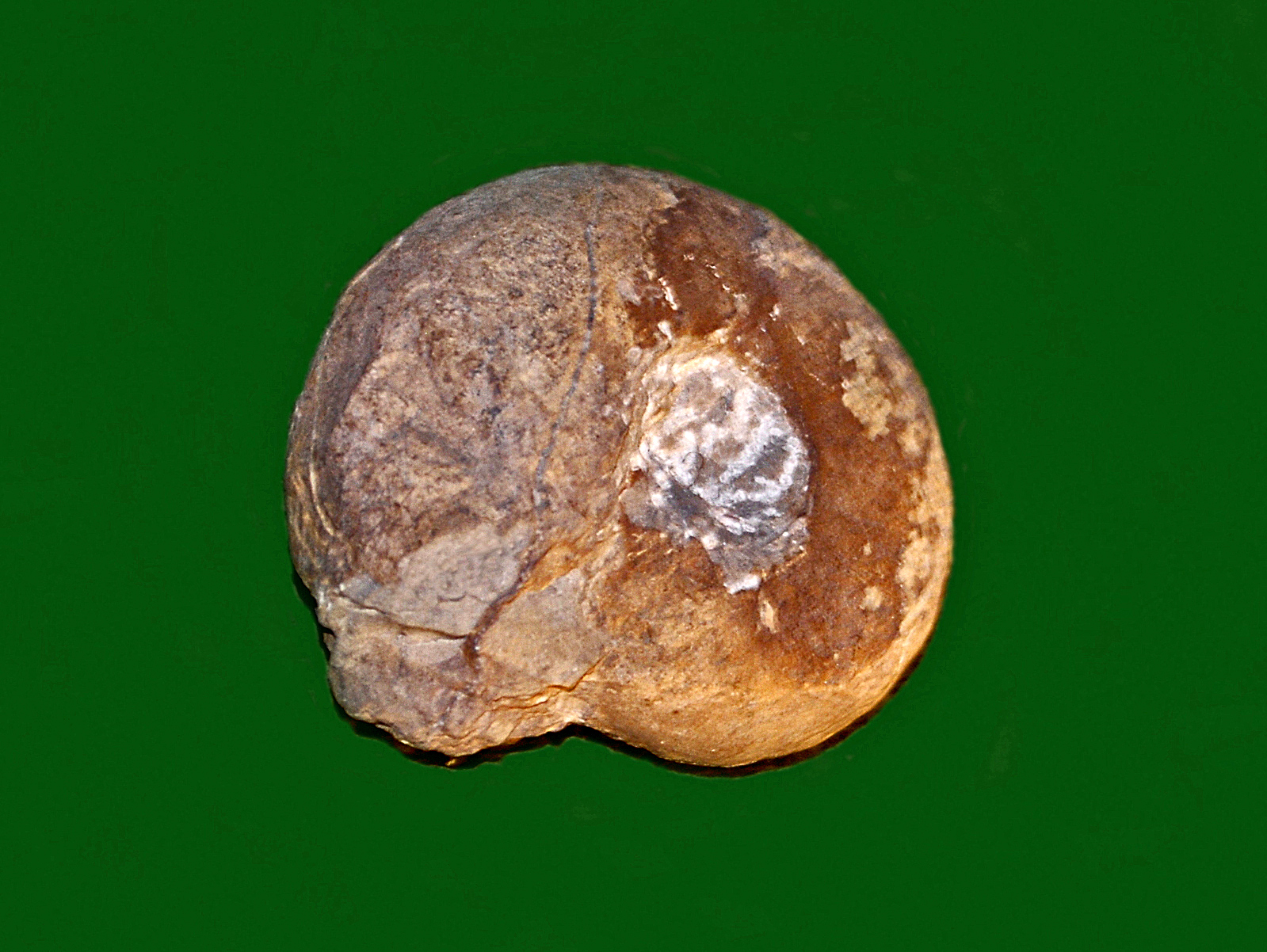
Goniatites bohemicus from Bavaria

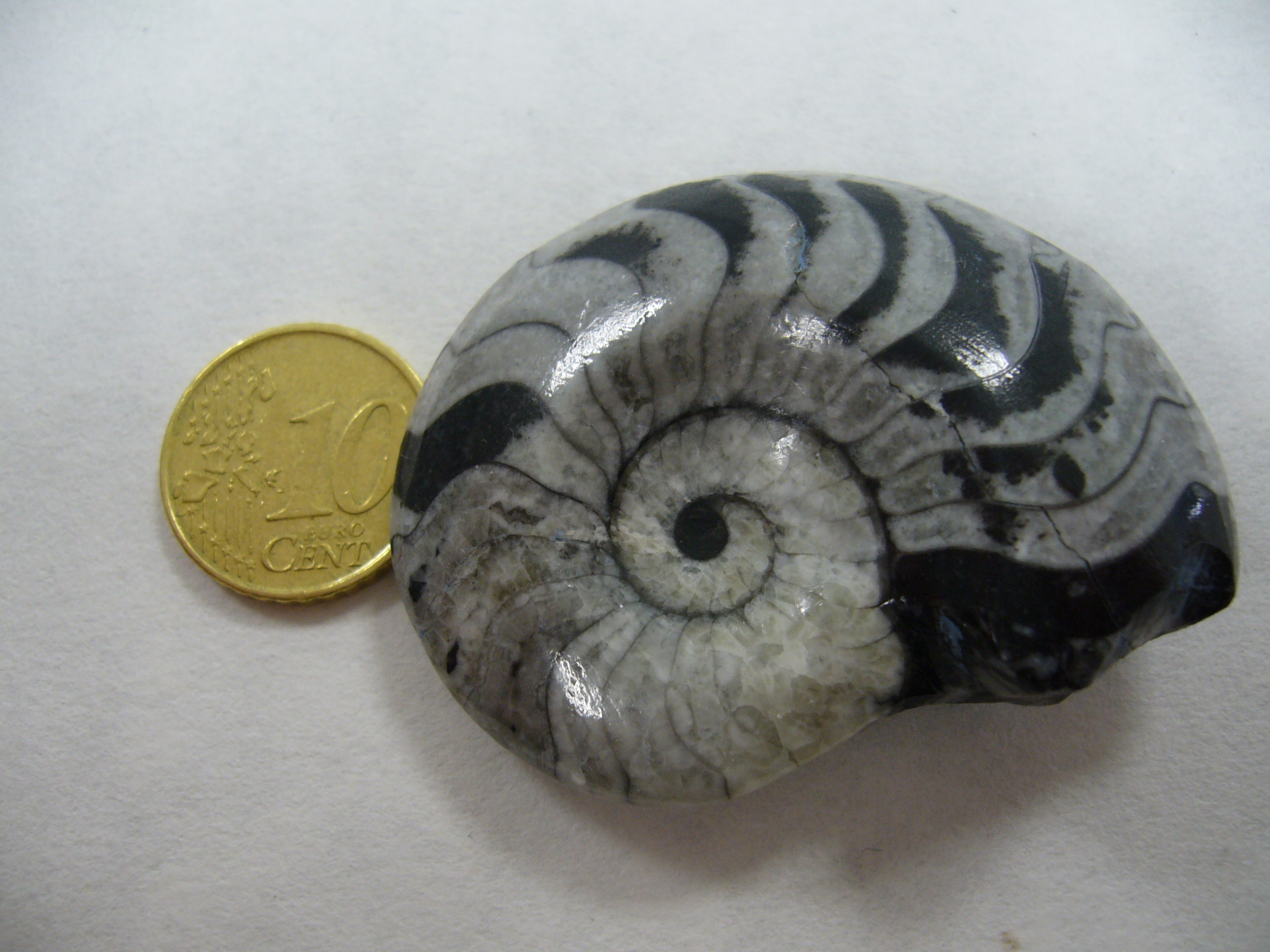
Goniatites species from Morocco
