= Delepinoceratidae =

Scientific classification
- Kingdom: Animalia
- Phylum: Mollusca
- Class: Cephalopoda
- Subclass: †Ammonoidea
- Order: †Goniatitida
- Superfamily: †Goniatitoidea
- Family: †Delepinoceratidae; Ruzhencev, 1957

Genera
- Delepinoceras; Platygoniatites

Delepinoceratidae is one of three families in the Goniatitoidea superfamily. They are an extinct group of ammonoid, which are shelled cephalopods related to squids, belemnites, octopuses, and cuttlefish, and more distantly to the nautiloids.
