= Neoglyphioceratidae =

Scientific classification
- Kingdom: Animalia
- Phylum: Mollusca
- Class: Cephalopoda
- Subclass: †Ammonoidea
- Order: †Goniatitida
- Superfamily: †Neoglyphioceratoidea
- Family: †Neoglyphioceratidae; Plummer & Scott 1937

Genera
- Lusitanites; Lytheoceras; Mirilentia; Neoglyphioceras

Extinct family of molluscs

Neoglyphioceratidae is one of six families of the Neoglyphioceratoidea superfamily. They are an extinct group of ammonoid, which are shelled cephalopods related to squids, belemnites, octopuses, and cuttlefish, and more distantly to the nautiloids.
