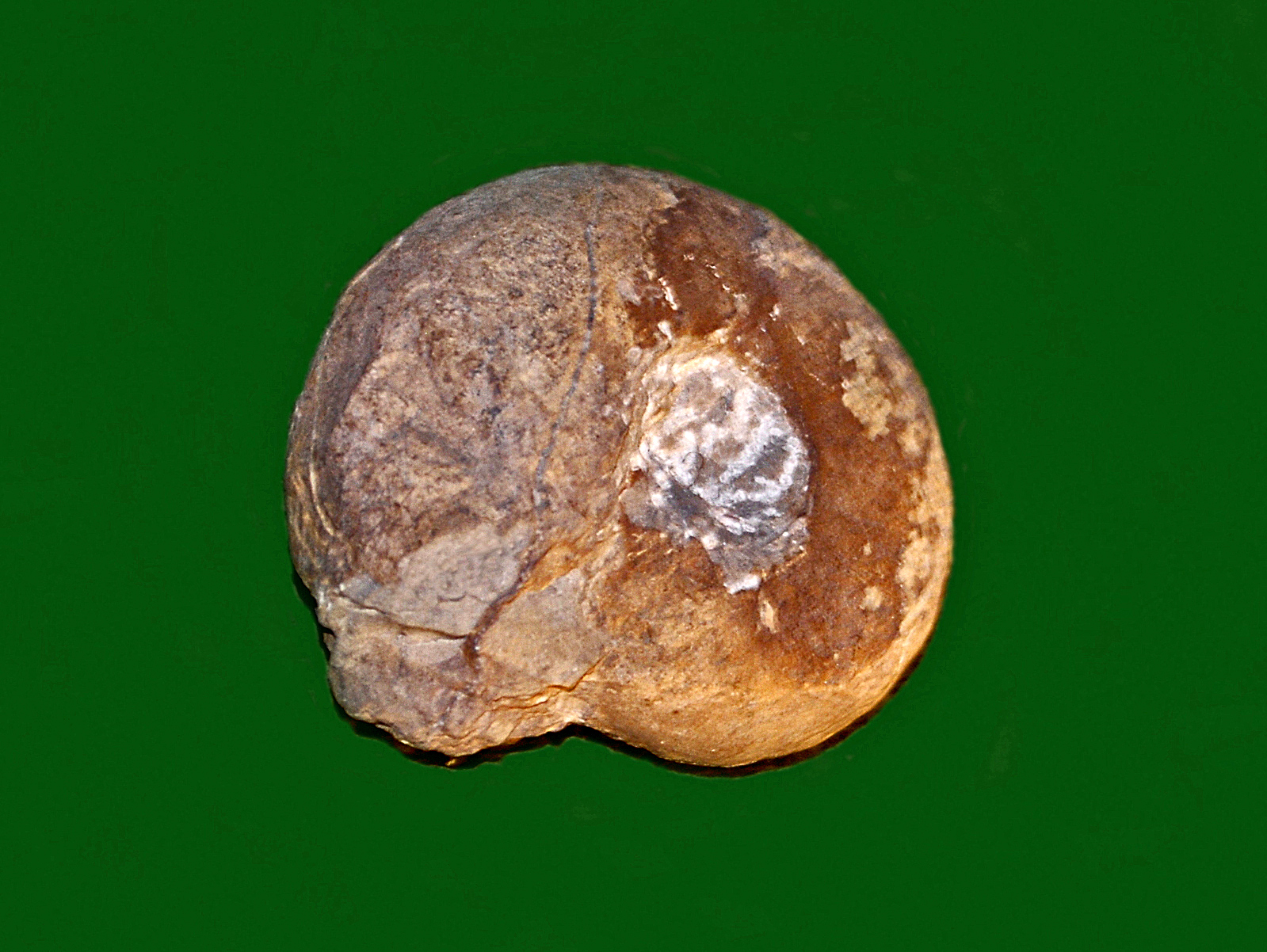
- Fossil of Goniatites bohemicus from Bavaria, on display at Galerie de paléontologie et d'anatomie comparée in Paris

Scientific classification
- Kingdom: Animalia
- Phylum: Mollusca
- Class: Cephalopoda
- Subclass: †Ammonoidea
- Order: †Goniatitida
- Family: †Goniatitidae
- Subfamily: †Goniatitinae

Genera
- Arnsbergites; Goniatitella; Goniatites; Hibernicoceras; Hypergoniatites; Junggarites; Lusitanoceras; Neogoniatites; Paraglyphioceras; Progoniatites

= Goniatitinae =

Goniatitinae Temporal range: Early Mississippian - Early Permian

Subfamily of molluscs

Goniatitinae is one of six subfamilies into which the Goniatitidae is subdivided according to Miller, Furnish, and Schindewolf, 1957. The diagnostic character is the narrow bifurcated (double pronged) ventral lobe of the suture, which lies along the outer rim. As with the inclusive Goniatitidae, sutures have eight lobes, shells are without prominent ornament, umbilici are small to moderate in size.

Subsequent classifications are somewhat confusing with genera originally included removed elsewhere and others brought in from other subfamilies.
