= Agastrioceras =

Scientific classification
- Kingdom: Animalia
- Phylum: Mollusca
- Class: Cephalopoda
- Subclass: †Ammonoidea
- Order: †Goniatitida
- Family: †Reticuloceratidae
- Subfamily: †Reticuloceratinae
- Genus: †Agastrioceras; Schmidt, 1938

Genus of molluscs (fossil)

Agastrioceras is a genus of cephalopod belonging to the Reticuloceratidae family. They are an extinct group of ammonoid, which are shelled cephalopods related to squids, belemnites, octopuses, and cuttlefish, and more distantly to the nautiloids.
