= Aphantites =

Aphantites Temporal range: U Carboniferous (U Penn)

Scientific classification
- Domain: Eukaryota
- Kingdom: Animalia
- Phylum: Mollusca
- Class: Cephalopoda
- Subclass: †Ammonoidea
- Order: †Goniatitida
- Family: †Reticuloceratidae
- Subfamily: †Reticuloceratinae
- Genus: †Aphantites; Ruzhencev & Bogoslovskaya, 1978

Genus of molluscs (fossil)

Aphantites is a Lower Pennsylvanian ammonite belonging to the goniatitid family Reticuloceratidae which are characterized by involute subdiscoidal shells covered by linear or biconvex growth lines that may be crossed by longitudinal lirae, producing a reticulate pattern. Sutures are simple, the ventral lobe double pronged. Related genera include Surenites and Reticuloceras.
