= Pronorites =

Pronorites Temporal range: Visean

Scientific classification
- Kingdom: Animalia
- Phylum: Mollusca
- Class: Cephalopoda
- Subclass: †Ammonoidea
- Order: †Prolecanitida
- Family: †Pronoritidae
- Subfamily: †Pronoritinae
- Genus: †Pronorites; Mojsisovics 1882

Species
- P. arkansasensis; P. llanoensis; P. mediterranea; P. pseudotimorensis; P. siebenthali

Genus of molluscs (fossil)

Pronorites is a prolecanitid genus from the middle and upper Carboniferous, upper Mississippian and Pennsylvanian. Distribution is wide spread.

Pronorites, as for the Pronoritidae, produced discoidal shells with no prominent sculpture, in which the ventral lobe of the suture has three prongs. In Pronorites the prongs of the 1st lateral lobe are simple, undivided.
