= Cardiopteris =

Scientific classification
- Kingdom: Plantae
- Clade: Tracheophytes
- Clade: Angiosperms
- Clade: Eudicots
- Clade: Asterids
- Order: Aquifoliales
- Family: Cardiopteridaceae
- Genus: Cardiopteris; Benth.

Synonyms
- Sioja Buch.-Ham. ex Lindl.; Peripterygium Hassk.

Genus of flowering plants

Cardiopteris is a genus of vines in the family Cardiopteridaceae described as a genus in 1834.

Cardiopteris is native to Southeast Asia, the Himalayas, and New Guinea.

Species

1. Cardiopteris moluccana Blume - Philippines, Maluku, Sulawesi, New Guinea, Bismarck Archipelago
2. Cardiopteris quinqueloba (Hassk.) Hassk. - Yunnan, Assam, Bhutan, Bangladesh, Indochina, Malaysia, Indonesia
