= Alaoceras =

Scientific classification
- Domain: Eukaryota
- Kingdom: Animalia
- Phylum: Mollusca
- Class: Cephalopoda
- Subclass: †Ammonoidea
- Order: †Goniatitida
- Family: †Cravenoceratidae
- Subfamily: †Cravenoceratinae
- Genus: †Alaoceras; Ruzhentzev & Bogoslovskaya, 1971

Genus of molluscs (fossil)

Alaoceras is an ammonoid cephalopod from the upper Paleozoic included in the goniatitid family Cravenoceratidae, named by Ruzhentsev & Bogoslovskaya in 1971.

Alaoceras is characterized by its generally subdiscoidal shell with moderately involute whorls and a wide or moderately wide umbilicus, ornamented with sharply defined lamellae, very weak and sometimes disappearing lirae, and elongated protuberances on the umbilical wall. Normally there are one or two constrictions per revolution. The suture is goniatitic with a widely diverging bifurcated ventral lobe in which the height of the median saddle is less than half of the whole lobe.

Alaoceras is probably derived from Pachylyroceras, which it resembles overall.
