= Graphiadactyllis =

Graphiadactyllis Temporal range: Carboniferous-Permian ~354–259 Ma

Scientific classification
- Domain: Eukaryota
- Kingdom: Animalia
- Phylum: Arthropoda
- Class: Ostracoda
- Order: Platycopida
- Family: †Quasillitidae
- Genus: †Graphiadactyllis; Roth, 1929

Species
- See text

Extinct genus of seed shrimp

Graphiadactyllis is an extinct genus of ostracod (seed shrimp) belonging to the family Quasillitidae and order Platycopida. Specimens have been found in Mississippian to Permian beds in North America, Europe, and Australia.

== Species ==
- Graphiadactyllis arkansana Girty 1910
- Graphiadactyllis australae Crespin 1945
- Graphiadactyllis deminuera Gründel 1975
- Graphiadactyllis jonesi Ferdinando 2001
