= Agathiceratidae =

Agathiceratidae Temporal range: Late Carboniferous - Middle Permian

Scientific classification
- Kingdom: Animalia
- Phylum: Mollusca
- Class: Cephalopoda
- Subclass: †Ammonoidea
- Order: †Goniatitida
- Superfamily: †Goniatitoidea
- Family: †Agathiceratidae; Arthaber, 1911

Genera
- Agathiceras; Gaetanoceras; Paragathiceras; Pericleites

Agathiceratidae, as revised, makes up the goniatitid superfamily Agathiceratoidea. Agathiceratidae, which lived from the Upper Carboniferous (Pennsylvanian) to the Middle Permian, combine related genera with subdiscoidal to globular shells that have a small umbilicus and goniatitic sutures and are prominently longitudinally lirate. (Miller et al. 1960) The explanation for the Agathiceratidae is that for the Agathiceratoidea.

Agathiceratidae may have its origin in Dombarites (Saunders et al. 1999) which has been removed to the Delepinoceratidae (Furnish et al. 2009). Delepinoceratidae is now one of two families that make up the Goniatitoidea.

In current taxonomy (Furnish et al. 2009), Agathiceratidae contains Agathiceras, Gaetanoceras, Paragathiceras, and Pericleites as compared to Dombarites, Paracravenoceras, Periclietes, Proshumardites, and Agathiceras in Saunders et al. (1999). Paracravenoceras is now placed in the Gastroceratoidea, Proshunardites combined with Dombarites in the Delepinoceratidae. The two added genera, Gaetanoceras and Paragathiceras, were considered as equivalent to Agathiceras in Miller et al. (1960).

== See also ==
- List of nautiloids
