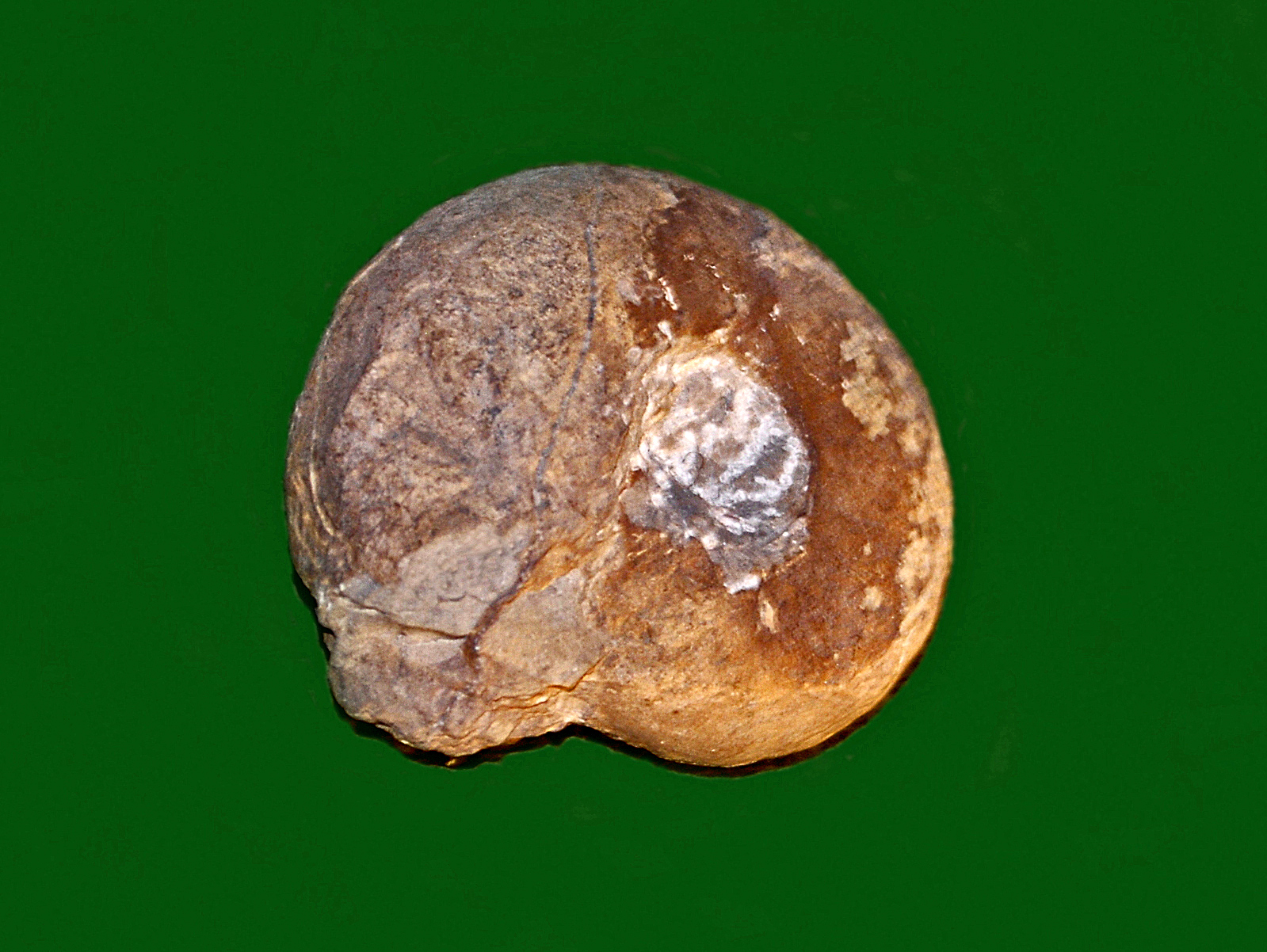
- Fossil of Goniatites bohemicus from Bavaria, on display at Galerie de paléontologie et d'anatomie comparée in Paris

Scientific classification
- Kingdom: Animalia
- Phylum: Mollusca
- Class: Cephalopoda
- Subclass: †Ammonoidea
- Order: †Goniatitida
- Suborder: †Goniatitina
- Superfamily: †Goniatitoidea; Haan 1825

Families
- Agathiceratidae; Delepinoceratidae; Goniatitidae

Synonyms
- Goniatitaceae

= Goniatitoidea =

Goniatitoidea Temporal range: Early Mississippian–Late Permian

Extinct superfamily of molluscs

Goniatitoidea, formerly Goniatitaceae in older publications, is a superfamily of late Paleozoic ammonoid cephalopods included in the Goniatitida. They are characterized by thinly discoidal to globular shells with variable umbilici and sculpture. The ventral lobe, located along the outer margin, is prominently bifurcated (two pronged); the lateral lobe undivided.
