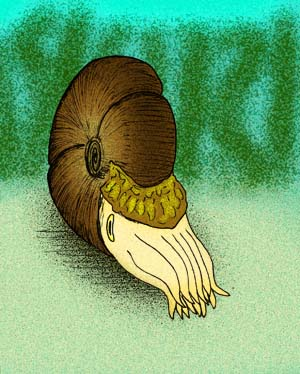
- Aenigmatoceras

Scientific classification
- Kingdom: Animalia
- Phylum: Mollusca
- Class: Cephalopoda
- Subclass: †Ammonoidea
- Order: †Goniatitida
- Suborder: †Goniatitina
- Superfamily: †Neoglyphioceratoidea; Plummer & Scott, 1937

Families
- Cravenoceratidae; Fayettevilleidae; Ferganoceratidae; Neoglyphioceratidae; Nuculoceratidae; Rhymmoceratidae

Synonyms
- Neoglyphiocerataceae

= Neoglyphioceratoidea =

Extinct superfamily of molluscs

Neoglyphioceratoidea is one of seventeen superfamilies of the Goniatitina suborder. They are an extinct group of ammonoid, which are shelled cephalopods related to squids, belemnites, octopodes, and cuttlefish, and more distantly to the nautiloids.
