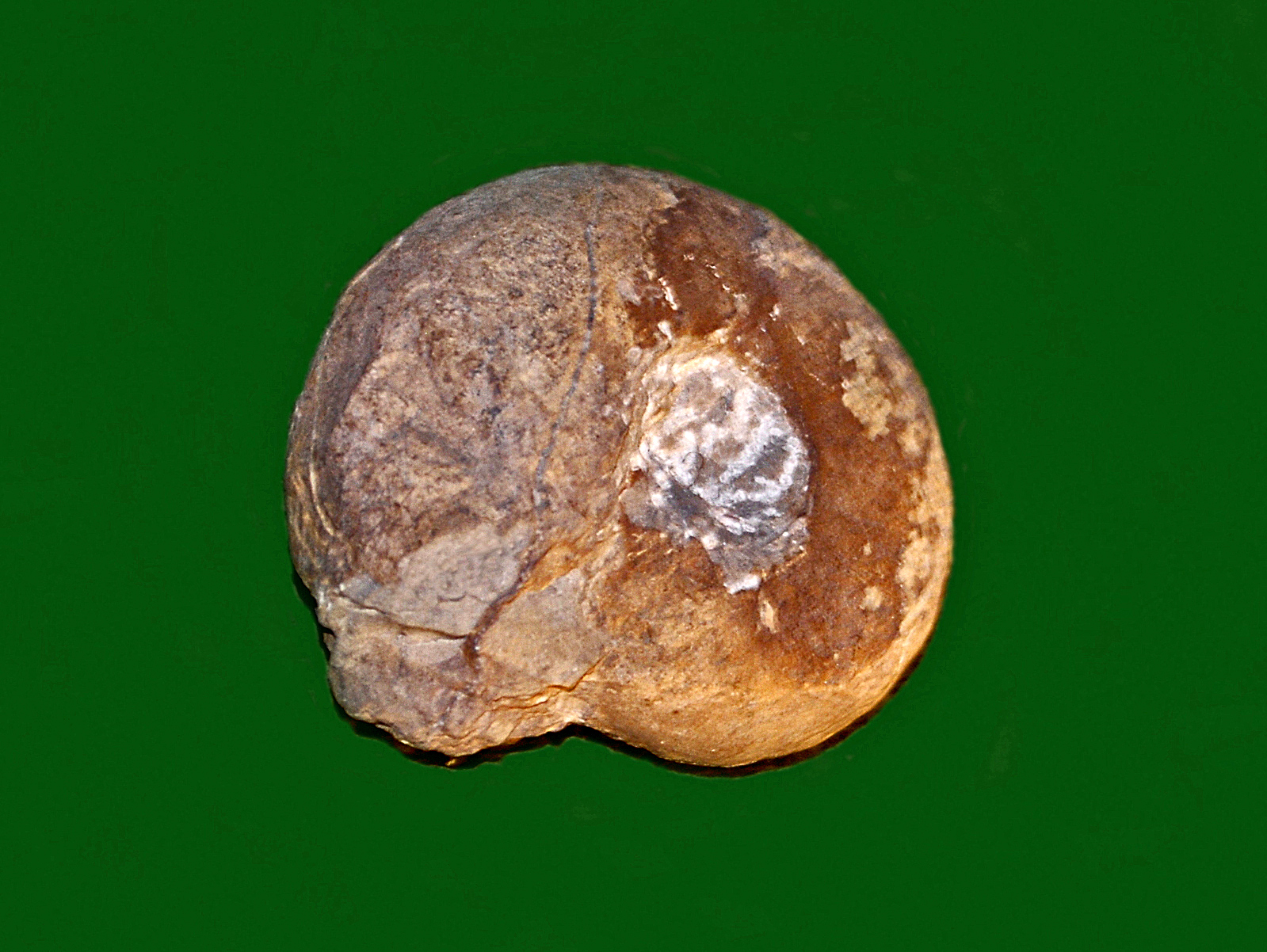
- Fossil of Goniatites bohemicus from Bavaria, on display at Galerie de paléontologie et d'anatomie comparée in Paris

Scientific classification
- Domain: Eukaryota
- Kingdom: Animalia
- Phylum: Mollusca
- Class: Cephalopoda
- Subclass: †Ammonoidea
- Order: †Goniatitida
- Superfamily: †Goniatitoidea
- Family: †Goniatitidae; Haan 1825

Subfamilies
- Goniatitinae; Sygambritinae

= Goniatitidae =

Goniatitidae Temporal range: Early Mississippian–Late Permian

Extinct family of molluscs

Goniatitidae is one of three families included in the ammonoid cephalopod superfamily Goniatitoidea, known from the Lower Mississippian to the Upper Permian. They have sutures that form 8 lobes and characteristically lack sculpture. The ventral lobe, as for the superfamily, is bifurcated.
