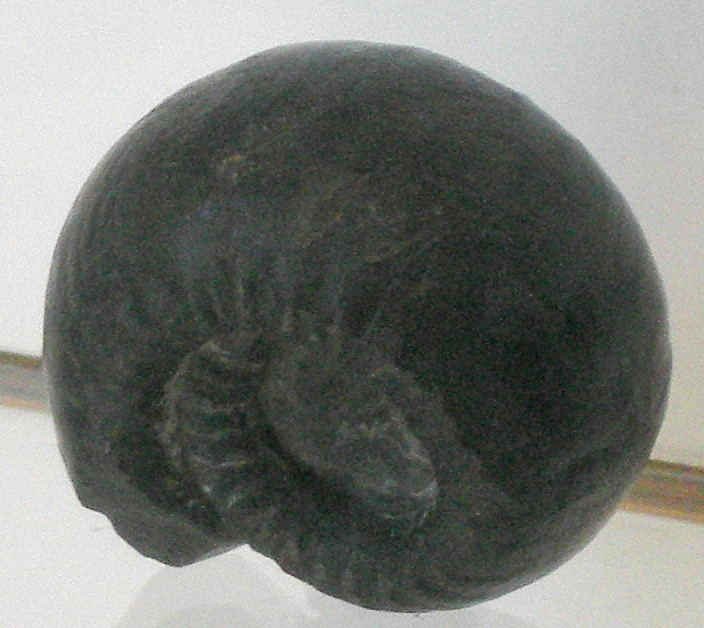

Scientific classification
- Domain: Eukaryota
- Kingdom: Animalia
- Phylum: Mollusca
- Class: Cephalopoda
- Subclass: †Ammonoidea
- Order: †Goniatitida
- Suborder: †Goniatitina
- Superfamily: †Gastrioceratoidea; Hyatt 1931

Families
- Decoritidae; Gastrioceratidae; Homoceratidae; Reticuloceratidae; Surenitidae

Synonyms
- Gastriocerataceae

= Gastrioceratoidea =

Gastrioceratoidea Temporal range: 314.8–306.5 Ma Late Mississippian - Middle Pennsylvanian

Extinct superfamily of molluscs

Gastrioceratoidea is one of 17 superfamilies in the suborder Goniatitina, ammonoid cephalopods from the Late Paleozoic.

Shells are variable in form with a broad whorl section and wide umbilicus. Early whorls are commonly evolute. Shells may be smooth or sculptured with transverse striae (fine grooves) and constrictions. The ventral lobe of the suture is double pronged, prongs being relatively wide but sides not diverging. The median saddle is half as high or more so than the height of the entire ventral lobe. The first lateral saddle, which lies next to the ventral lobe is either rounded or subacute.

Gastrioceratoideae lived during the middle part of the Carboniferous, from the latest Mississippian to the middle of the Pennsylvanian lasting for some eight million years. Greatest generic diversity occurred during the early Pennsylvanian.
