= Cravenoceratidae =

Scientific classification
- Kingdom: Animalia
- Phylum: Mollusca
- Class: Cephalopoda
- Subclass: †Ammonoidea
- Order: †Goniatitida
- Superfamily: †Neoglyphioceratoidea
- Family: †Cravenoceratidae; Ruzhencev 1957

Subfamilies
- Cravenoceratinae; Lyrogoniatitinae

Extinct family of molluscs

The Cravenoceratidae is one of six families included in the ammonoid superfamily Neoglyphioceratoidea, which lived during the latter part of the Paleozoic era.

Cravenoceratid genera have moderately evolute to involute, broad or thickly discoidal shells with a moderately narrow umbilicus. The surface is generally smooth, dominated by growth striae. Spiral ornamentation may be present, but reticulate ornament is absent. The ventral lobe is double pronged and relatively narrow, with the median saddle in most forms less than half of height of entire lobe itself.
