= Vasily Ruzhentsev =

- Born: Vasily Yermolayevich Ruzhentsev; 4 April 1899; Polovitniki, Dukhovshchinsky Uyezd, Smolensk Governorate, Russian Empire
- Died: 12 October 1978 (aged 79); Moscow, Russian SFSR, Soviet Union
- Citizenship: Soviet
- Known for: Ammonite research
- Awards: Lenin Prize (1967)
- Scientific career
- Fields: Paleontology, malacology

Vasily Yermolayevich Ruzhentsev (Russian: Василий Ермолаевич Руженцев; 4 April 1899 – 12 October 1978) was a Soviet paleontologist, malacologist and geologist. From 1937 to 1978 he worked at the Paleontological Institute of Russian Academy of Sciences. He had 117 publications of which 17 were monographs. From 1966 to 1978 he was editor in chief of the Transactions of the Paleontological Institute.

== Sources ==
- Leonova, T.P. (2009) ВАСИЛИЙ ЕРМОЛАЕВИЧ РУЖЕНЦЕВ ‒ 110 ЛЕТ СО ДНЯ РОЖДЕНИЯ In: Современные проблемы изучения головоногих моллюсков. Морфология, систематика, эволюция, экология и биостратиграфия. - Russian Academy of Sciences (Jubilee symposium volume)
