= 2014 in paleomalacology =

This list of fossil molluscs described in 2014 is a list of new taxa of fossil molluscs that were described during the year 2014, as well as other significant discoveries and events related to molluscan paleontology that occurred in that year.

== Newly named ammonites ==
Name	Novelty	Status	Authors	Age	Unit	Location	Notes	Images
Agassiceras pseudostriaries	Sp nov	Valid	Dommergues & Corna	Early Jurassic (early Sinemurian)		France	A member of Arietitidae, a species of Agassiceras.	
Amorina binii	Sp. nov	Valid	Vermeulen et al.	Early Cretaceous		France	A member of the family Anahamulinidae.	
Amorina guieui	Sp. nov	Valid	Vermeulen et al.	Early Cretaceous		France	A member of the family Anahamulinidae.	
Anagaudryceras compressum	Sp nov	Valid	Shigeta & Nishimura	Late Cretaceous (early Maastrichtian)		Japan	A species of Anagaudryceras.	
Arasella	Gen. et comb. nov	Valid	Ghaderi et al.	Late Permian (Changhsingian)		Azerbaijan; Iran	A member of Dzhulfitidae. The type species is "Sinoceltites" minutus Zakharov (1983).	
Ardesciella	Gen. et comb. nov	Valid	Bulot, Frau & Wimbledon	Late Jurassic (Tithonian)		Algeria; France; Morocco; Spain	A himalayitid perisphinctoid. A new genus for "Himalayites" (?Corongoceras) rhodanicus Mazenot (1939); genus also contains "Micracanthoceras" (Corongoceras) hispanicum Tavera (1985).	
Armatites kaufmanni	Sp nov	Valid	Korn	Late Devonian (early Famennian)		Germany	A species of Armatites.	
Audouliceras brusyankense	Sp nov	Valid	Stenshin, Shumilkin & Uspensky	Early Cretaceous (Aptian)		Russia	A member of Ancyloceratidae. Originally described as a species of Audouliceras, but subsequently transferred to the genus Ulyanovskiceras.	
Audouliceras mordovense	Sp nov	Valid	Stenshin, Shumilkin & Uspensky	Early Cretaceous (Aptian)		Russia	A member of Ancyloceratidae. Originally described as a species of Audouliceras, but subsequently transferred to the genus Ulyanovskiceras.	
Audouliceras vyrystaykense	Sp nov	Valid	Stenshin, Shumilkin & Uspensky	Early Cretaceous (Aptian)		Russia	A member of Ancyloceratidae. Originally described as a species of Audouliceras, but subsequently made the type species of the separate genus Ulyanovskiceras.	
Aulacostephanus hantzperguei	Sp nov	Valid	Borrelli	Late Jurassic (late Kimmeridgian)		France; Russia	An aulacostephanid, a species of Aulacostephanus.	
Aulacostephanus precontejeani	Sp nov	Valid	Borrelli	Late Jurassic (late Kimmeridgian)		France	An aulacostephanid, a species of Aulacostephanus.	
Australiceras (Proaustraliceras) elegans	Sp nov	Valid	Stenshin, Shumilkin & Uspensky	Early Cretaceous (Aptian)		Russia	A member of Ancyloceratidae, a species of Australiceras.	
Badina malnoei	Sp. nov	Valid	Vermeulen et al.	Early Cretaceous		France	A member of the family Anahamulinidae.	
Borealites (Borealites) schulginae	Sp nov	Valid	Igolnikov	Early Cretaceous (Berriasian)		Russia	A member of Craspeditidae, a species of Borealites.	
Borealites (Pseudocraspedites) compressus	Sp nov	Valid	Igolnikov	Early Cretaceous (Berriasian)		Russia	A member of Craspeditidae, a species of Borealites.	
Brasilia decipiformis	Sp nov	Valid	Dietze et al.	Middle Jurassic (Aalenian)		Germany	A member of Graphoceratidae, a species of Brasilia.	
Brasilia geisingensis	Sp nov	Valid	Dietze et al.	Middle Jurassic (Aalenian)		Germany	A member of Graphoceratidae, a species of Brasilia.	
Camereiceras cadotae	Sp. nov	Valid	Vermeulen et al.	Early Cretaceous		France	A member of the family Hemihoplitidae.	
Camereiceras evolutum	Sp. nov	Valid	Vermeulen et al.	Early Cretaceous		France	A member of the family Hemihoplitidae.	
Collignoniceras uchauxiense	Sp nov	Valid	Amédro & Devalque in Robaszynski et al.	Late Cretaceous (Turonian)		France		
Coronicymbites	Gen. et sp. nov	Valid	Dommergues & Corna	Early Jurassic (early Sinemurian)		France	A member of Arietitidae. The type species is Coronicymbites furcatus.	
Crussoliceras dubisense	Sp nov	Valid	Énay, Gallois & Etches	Late Jurassic		France	A perisphinctid, a species of Crussoliceras.	
Crussoliceras lamberti	Sp nov	Valid	Énay, Gallois & Etches	Late Jurassic		France	A perisphinctid, a species of Crussoliceras.	
Crussoliceras lotharingicum	Sp nov	Valid	Énay, Gallois & Etches	Late Jurassic		France	A perisphinctid, a species of Crussoliceras.	
Crussoliceras petitclerci	Sp nov	Valid	Énay, Gallois & Etches	Late Jurassic		France	A perisphinctid, a species of Crussoliceras.	
Cymaclymenia aulax	Sp. nov	Valid	Korn in Klein & Korn	Devonian (Famennian)		Morocco	A member of Clymeniida belonging to the family Cymaclymeniidae.	
Cymaclymenia carnata	Sp. nov	Valid	Korn in Klein & Korn	Devonian (Famennian)		Morocco	A member of Clymeniida belonging to the family Cymaclymeniidae.	
Cymaclymenia formosa	Sp. nov	Valid	Korn in Klein & Korn	Devonian (Famennian)		Morocco	A member of Clymeniida belonging to the family Cymaclymeniidae.	
Cymaclymenia lambidia	Sp. nov	Valid	Korn in Klein & Korn	Devonian (Famennian)		Morocco	A member of Clymeniida belonging to the family Cymaclymeniidae.	
Cymaclymenia serotina	Sp. nov	Valid	Korn in Klein & Korn	Devonian (Famennian)		Morocco	A member of Clymeniida belonging to the family Cymaclymeniidae.	
Cymaclymenia subvexa	Sp. nov	Valid	Korn in Klein & Korn	Devonian (Famennian)		Morocco	A member of Clymeniida belonging to the family Cymaclymeniidae.	
Dactylioceras (Dactylioceras) laticostatum	Sp nov	Valid	Bardin et al.	Early Jurassic (early Toarcian)		Morocco	A species of Dactylioceras.	
Davouxina hoaraui	Sp. nov	Valid	Vermeulen et al.	Early Cretaceous		France	A member of the family Anahamulinidae.	
Dissimilites intermedius	Sp nov	Valid	Lukeneder & Lukeneder	Early Cretaceous (Barremian)		Italy	An acrioceratid ancyloceratoid, a species of Dissimilites.	
Garroniceras dommerguesi	Sp. nov	Valid	Vermeulen & Meister	Early Cretaceous (Hauterivian)		Switzerland		
Garroniceras schoendelmayeri	Sp. nov	Valid	Vermeulen & Meister	Early Cretaceous (Hauterivian)		Switzerland		
Garroniceras thibaudi	Sp. nov	Valid	Vermeulen & Meister	Early Cretaceous (Hauterivian)		France		
Gassendiceras essaouirae	Sp nov	Valid	Bert & Bersac	Early Cretaceous (early Barremian)	Essaouira Basin	Morocco	A member of Hemihoplitidae, a species of Gassendiceras.	
Goudemandites langsonensis	Sp nov	Valid	Shigeta & Nguyen in Shigeta et al.	Early Triassic (Olenekian)	Bac Thuy Formation	Vietnam	A relative of Palaeophyllites, a species of Goudemandites.	
Holcophylloceras avrami	Sp nov	Valid	Vašíček et al.	Early Cretaceous (late Barremian)		Serbia	A species of Holcophylloceras.	
Hypophylloceras danubiense	Sp nov	Valid	Vašíček et al.	Early Cretaceous (late Barremian)		Serbia	A species of Hypophylloceras.	
Khetoceras	Gen. et comb. et sp. nov	Valid	Rogov	Late Jurassic		Russia	A relative of Craspedites. A new genus for "Garniericeras" margaritae Schulgina (1969); genus also contains a new species Khetoceras craspeditiformis.	
Kleiniceras	Gen. et sp. nov	Valid	Vermeulen et al.	Early Cretaceous		France	A member of the family Anahamulinidae. The type species is K. compsensisformis; genus also includes Kleiniceras mimica Vermeulen et al. (2010) and Kleiniceras compsensis Vermeulen et al. (2010).	
Leptohamulina garronae	Sp. nov	Valid	Vermeulen et al.	Early Cretaceous		France	A member of the family Anahamulinidae.	
Masiaposites kennedyi	Sp nov	Valid	Amédro & Devalque in Robaszynski et al.	Late Cretaceous (Turonian)		France		
Mesodactylites pisznicensis	Sp nov	Valid	Kovács	Early Jurassic (Toarcian)		Hungary	A member of Dactylioceratidae, a species of Mesodactylites.	
Microbiplices anglicus vieluniensis	Subsp. nov	Valid	Wierzbowski & Matyja	Late Jurassic (late Oxfordian)		Poland	A member of Aulacostephanidae; a subspecies of Microbiplices anglicus.	
Microdactylites tardosensis	Sp nov	Valid	Kovács	Early Jurassic (Toarcian)		Hungary	A member of Dactylioceratidae, a species of Microdactylites.	
Montanesiceras sizarolsae	Sp. nov	Valid	Vermeulen et al.	Early Cretaceous		France	A member of the family Barremitidae.	
Morewites	Gen. et sp nov	Valid	Shigeta	Late Cretaceous (late Santonian? to early Campanian)		Japan; United States?	A nostoceratid. The type species is Morewites sakakibarai.	
Morphoceras kelarizis	Sp nov	Valid	Dietze, Seyed-Emami & Raoufian	Middle Jurassic	Dalichai Formation	Iran	A member of Morphoceratidae, a species of Morphoceras.	
Neoglaphyrites discoidalis	Sp nov	Valid	Ehiro, Nishikawa & Nishikawa	Early Permian (Asselian)	Uyamano Formation	Japan	A species of Neoglaphyrites.	
Nodicoeloceras dulaii	Sp nov	Valid	Kovács	Early Jurassic (Toarcian)		Hungary	A member of Dactylioceratidae, a species of Nodicoeloceras.	
Olcostephanus (Olcostephanus) cuencamensis	Sp nov	Valid	González-Arreola, Barragán & Moreno-Bedmar	Early Cretaceous (Valanginian)	Taraises Formation	Mexico	An olcostephanid, a species of Olcostephanus.	
Phyllopachyceras petkovici	Sp nov	Valid	Vašíček et al.	Early Cretaceous (late Barremian)		Serbia	A species of Phyllopachyceras.	
Postclymenia calceola	Sp. nov	Valid	Korn in Klein & Korn	Devonian (Famennian)		Morocco	A member of Clymeniida belonging to the family Cymaclymeniidae.	
Praedaraelites tuntungensis	Sp nov	Valid	Hassan et al.	Carboniferous (late Viséan)	Chepor Member of the Kubang Pasu Formation	Malaysia	A species of Praedaraelites.	
Pratumidiscus	Gen. et sp. nov	Valid	Bulot, Frau & Wimbledon	Late Jurassic (Tithonian)		France	A himalayitid perisphinctoid. The type species is Pratumidiscus elsae.	
Prionoceras jeranense	Sp nov	Valid	Korn, Bockwinkel & Ebbighausen	Late Devonian (middle Famennian)		Morocco	A prionoceratid goniatite, a species of Prionoceras.	
Prionoceras lamellosum	Sp nov	Valid	Korn, Bockwinkel & Ebbighausen	Late Devonian (middle Famennian)		Morocco	A prionoceratid goniatite, a species of Prionoceras.	
Prionoceras lentis	Sp nov	Valid	Korn, Bockwinkel & Ebbighausen	Late Devonian (middle Famennian)		Algeria; Morocco	A prionoceratid goniatite, a species of Prionoceras.	
Prionoceras mrakibense	Sp nov	Valid	Korn, Bockwinkel & Ebbighausen	Late Devonian (middle Famennian)		Morocco	A prionoceratid goniatite, a species of Prionoceras.	
Prionoceras ouarouroutense	Sp nov	Valid	Korn, Bockwinkel & Ebbighausen	Late Devonian (middle Famennian)		Algeria; Morocco	A prionoceratid goniatite, a species of Prionoceras.	
Prionoceras subtum	Sp nov	Valid	Korn, Bockwinkel & Ebbighausen	Late Devonian (middle Famennian)		Morocco	A prionoceratid goniatite, a species of Prionoceras.	
Prionoceras takhbtitense	Sp nov	Valid	Korn, Bockwinkel & Ebbighausen	Late Devonian (middle Famennian)		Morocco	A prionoceratid goniatite, a species of Prionoceras.	
Prionoceras tetrans	Sp nov	Valid	Korn, Bockwinkel & Ebbighausen	Late Devonian (middle Famennian)		Morocco	A prionoceratid goniatite, a species of Prionoceras.	
Prionoceras triens	Sp nov	Valid	Korn, Bockwinkel & Ebbighausen	Late Devonian (middle Famennian)		Morocco	A prionoceratid goniatite, a species of Prionoceras.	
Prionoceras vetus	Sp nov	Valid	Korn, Bockwinkel & Ebbighausen	Late Devonian (middle Famennian)		Morocco	A prionoceratid goniatite, a species of Prionoceras.	
Procerites (Gracilisphinctes) intermedius	Sp nov	Valid	Jain	Middle Jurassic (Bathonian)	Patcham Formation	India	A perisphinctid, a species of Procerites.	
Procymaclymenia ebbighauseni	Sp. nov	Valid	Korn in Klein & Korn	Devonian (Famennian)		Morocco	A member of Clymeniida belonging to the family Cymaclymeniidae.	
Pseudoancyloceras	Gen. et sp. nov	Valid	Stenshin, Shumilkin & Uspensky	Early Cretaceous (Aptian)		Russia	A member of Ancyloceratidae. The type species is Pseudoancyloceras kalinovense.	
Pseudobarremites	Gen. et sp. et comb. nov	Valid	Vermeulen et al.	Early Cretaceous		France	A member of the family Barremitidae. The type species is P. raybaudae; genus also includes Pseudobarremites primitivius (Cecca, Faraoni & Marini, 1998).	
Pseudocymbites	Gen. et sp. nov	Valid	Dommergues & Corna	Early Jurassic (early Sinemurian)		France	A member of Arietitidae. The type species is Pseudocymbites constrictoides.	
Sharpeiceras australe	Sp nov	Valid	Kennedy	Late Cretaceous (Cenomanian)		Madagascar	A member of the family Acanthoceratidae belonging to the subfamily Mantelliceratinae.	
Somoholites miharanoroensis	Sp nov	Valid	Ehiro, Nishikawa & Nishikawa	Early Permian (Asselian)	Uyamano Formation	Japan	A species of Somoholites.	
Stoyanowites	Gen. et comb. nov	Valid	Ghaderi et al.	Late Permian (Changhsingian)		Azerbaijan; Iran	A member of Dzhulfitidae. The type species is "Paratirolites" dieneri Stoyanow (1910).	
Subdichotomoceras lamplughi dorsetense	Subsp nov	Valid	Énay, Gallois & Etches	Late Jurassic	Kimmeridge Clay	United Kingdom	A perisphinctid, a subspecies of Subdichotomoceras lamplughi.	
Subdichotomoceras? praecursor	Sp nov	Valid	Énay, Gallois & Etches	Late Jurassic		France	A perisphinctid, possibly a species of Subdichotomoceras.	
Subdiscosphinctes hachiyai	Sp nov	Valid	Sato & Yamada	Late Jurassic (Oxfordian)	Arimine Formation	Japan	A perisphinctid.	
Substeueroceras sarysuensis	Sp nov	Valid	Arkadiev	Early Cretaceous (Berriasian)		Crimea	A member of the family Neocomitidae.	
Telodactylites levisettii	Sp nov	Valid	Kovács	Early Jurassic (Toarcian)		Hungary	A member of Dactylioceratidae, a species of Telodactylites.	
Tolvericeras? anglicum	Sp nov	Valid	Énay, Gallois & Etches	Late Jurassic	Kimmeridge Clay	United Kingdom	A perisphinctid, possibly a species of Tolvericeras.	
Tolvericeras popeyense	Sp nov	Valid	Énay, Gallois & Etches	Late Jurassic		France	A perisphinctid, a species of Tolvericeras.	
Tolvericeras robertianum	Sp nov	Valid	Énay, Gallois & Etches	Late Jurassic	Kimmeridge Clay	United Kingdom	A perisphinctid, a species of Tolvericeras.	
Tragorhacoceras xiugugabuense	Sp nov	Valid	Liu & Mu	Late Triassic (Norian)		China	A member of Discophyllitidae, a species of Tragorhacoceras.	
Tropaeum (Tropaeum) elaurkense	Sp nov	Valid	Stenshin, Shumilkin & Uspensky	Early Cretaceous (Aptian)		Russia	A member of Ancyloceratidae, a species of Tropaeum.	
Vasicekina pachycostata	Sp. nov	Valid	Vermeulen et al.	Early Cretaceous		France	A member of the family Anahamulinidae.	
Zaraiskites densecostatus	Sp nov	Valid	Rogov in Rogov & Starodubtseva	Late Jurassic		Russia	A member of the family Virgatitidae.	

== Other cephalopods ==
Name	Novelty	Status	Authors	Age	Unit	Location	Notes	Images
Arionoceras kennethdebaetsi	Sp. nov	Valid	Frey et al.	Early Devonian (Pragian)		Morocco	An arionoceratid, a species of Arionoceras.	
Armenoceras myanmarense	Sp. nov	Valid	Niko & Sone	Ordovician (Darriwilian)		Myanmar	A member of Actinocerida, a species of Armenoceras.	
Coelogasteroceras uralense	Sp. nov	Valid	Barskov & Shilovsky in Barskov, Leonova & Shilovsky	Middle Permian (Kazanian)		Russia	A member of Liroceratidae, a species of Coelogasteroceras.	
Eocylindroteuthis (?) yokoyamai	Sp. nov	Valid	Iba, Sano & Mutterlose	Early Jurassic (Sinemurian)	Hosoura Formation	Japan	A belemnitinan belemnite, possibly a species of Eocylindroteuthis.	
Exoticeras	Gen. et sp. nov	Valid	Barskov & Shilovsky in Barskov, Leonova & Shilovsky	Middle Permian (Kazanian)		Russia	A member of Nautilida of uncertain phylogenetic placement. The type species is Exoticeras exoticum.	
Hemiliroceras esaulovae	Sp. nov	Valid	Barskov & Shilovsky in Barskov, Leonova & Shilovsky	Middle Permian (Kazanian)		Russia	A member of Liroceratidae, a species of Hemiliroceras.	
Liroceras volgense	Sp. nov	Valid	Barskov & Shilovsky in Barskov, Leonova & Shilovsky	Middle Permian (Kazanian)		Russia	A member of Liroceratidae, a species of Liroceras.	
Nemdoceras	Gen. et 3 sp. nov	Valid	Barskov & Shilovsky in Barskov, Leonova & Shilovsky	Middle Permian (Kazanian)		Russia	A nautiloid related to Permonautilus. Genus contains three species: Nemdoceras evolutum, Nemdoceras kremeshkense and Nemdoceras nemdense.	
Nipponoteuthis	Gen. et sp. nov	Valid	Iba, Sano & Mutterlose	Early Jurassic (Sinemurian)	Hosoura Formation	Japan	A belemnitinan belemnite. The type species is Nipponoteuthis katana.	
Ordosoceras theini	Sp. nov	Valid	Niko & Sone	Ordovician (Floian or Dapingian)		Myanmar	A member of Actinocerida, a species of Ordosoceras.	
Paraliroceras	Gen. et sp. nov	Valid	Barskov & Shilovsky in Barskov, Leonova & Shilovsky	Middle Permian (Kazanian)		Russia	A member of Liroceratidae. The type species is Paraliroceras kazanicum.	
Peripetoceras burovi	Sp. nov	Valid	Barskov & Shilovsky in Barskov, Leonova & Shilovsky	Middle Permian (Kazanian)		Russia	A member of Liroceratidae, a species of Peripetoceras.	
Peripetoceras ideliense	Sp. nov	Valid	Barskov & Shilovsky in Barskov, Leonova & Shilovsky	Middle Permian (Kazanian)		Russia	A member of Liroceratidae, a species of Peripetoceras.	
Permodomatoceras marielense	Sp. nov	Valid	Barskov & Shilovsky in Barskov, Leonova & Shilovsky	Middle Permian (Kazanian)		Russia	A nautiloid related to Domatoceras, a species of Permodomatoceras.	
Permodomatoceras permianum	Sp. nov	Valid	Barskov & Shilovsky in Barskov, Leonova & Shilovsky	Middle Permian (Kazanian)		Russia	A nautiloid related to Domatoceras, a species of Permodomatoceras.	
Permonautilus kruglovi	Sp. nov	Valid	Barskov & Shilovsky in Barskov, Leonova & Shilovsky	Middle Permian (Kazanian)		Russia	A permonautilid nautiloid, a species of Permonautilus.	
Permonautilus parapinegaensis	Sp. nov	Valid	Barskov & Shilovsky in Barskov, Leonova & Shilovsky	Middle Permian (Kazanian)		Russia	A permonautilid nautiloid, a species of Permonautilus.	
Tatianautilus	Gen. et sp. nov	Valid	Barskov & Shilovsky in Barskov, Leonova & Shilovsky	Middle Permian (Kazanian)		Russia	A nautiloid related to Permonautilus. The type species is Tatianautilus leonovae.	
Tenuitheoceras	Gen. et sp. nov	Valid	Frey et al.	Early Devonian (Pragian)		Morocco	An orthoceratid. The type species is Tenuitheoceras secretum.	

== Newly named gastropods ==
Name	Novelty	Status	Authors	Age	Unit	Location	Notes	Images
Abyssomelania	Gen. et 2 sp. nov	Valid	Kaim et al.	Cretaceous (Albian to Campanian)		New Zealand; United States	A member of Hokkaidoconchidae. The type species is Abyssomelania cramptoni; genus also contains Abyssomelania campbellae.	
?Aclis aenigmaticus	Sp. nov	Valid	Merle in Petit et al.	Eocene (late Ypresian)	Monte Bolca locality	Italy	A member of Aclididae, possibly a species of Aclis.	
Acteon aubrechti	Sp nov	Valid	Harzhauser	Miocene (Burdigalian)		India	A species of Acteon.	
Alocospira uter	Sp nov	Valid	Harzhauser	Miocene (Burdigalian)	Warkalli Formation	India	An olive snail, a species of Alocospira.	
Amaea (Amaea) varicosa	Sp nov	Valid	Jain	Neogene		India		
Amaurellina chodmonensis	Sp. nov	Valid	Pacaud & Ledon	Eocene (Lutetian)		France	A member of the family Ampullinidae.	
Ambercyclus	Gen. et comb. et 3 sp. nov	Valid	Ferrari, Kaim & Damborenea	Early Jurassic to Early Cretaceous		Argentina; Chile; France; Germany; Morocco; Norway; United Kingdom; United States	A member of Eucyclidae. A new genus for "Amberleya" orbignyana Hudleston (1892); genus also contains "Amberleya" pagodiformis Hudleston (1892), "Amberleya" obornensis Hudleston (1892), "Eucyclus" goniatus Eudes-Deslongchamps (1860), "Amberleya"? espinosa Ferrari (2009), "Turbo" capitaneus Münster (1844), "Turbo" elegans Münster (1844), "Turbo" murchisoni Münster (1844), "Amberleya" decorata Martin (1858), "Turbo" ornatus Sowerby (1819), "Trochus" bisertus Phillips (1829), "Amberleya" generalis Münster (1844), "Amberleya" armigera Lycett (1863), "Amberleya" monolifera Lycett (1863), "Amberleya" dilleri Stanton (1895), "Turbo" morganensis Stanton (1895), "Trochus" gaudrianus d'Orbigny (1852) and possibly the new species Ambercyclus? isabelensis Ferrari, Kaim & Damborenea (2014), as well as Ambercyclus andinus Ferrari (2014) and Ambercyclus chilcaensis Ferrari (2014).	
Ampullina corberica	Nom. nov	Valid	Pacaud & Ledon	Eocene (Ypresian)		France	A member of the family Ampullinidae, a species of Ampullina; a replacement name for Ampullina obtusa Doncieux (1908) and Ampullina doncieuxi Plaziat (1970) (both preoccupied).	
Aplus pliorecens	Sp. nov	Valid	Brunetti & Della Bella	Pliocene and early Pleistocene		Italy	A member of Buccinidae.	
Aplus pliounifilosus	Sp. nov	Valid	Brunetti & Della Bella	Pliocene		Italy	A member of Buccinidae.	
Ascheria	Gen. et comb. nov	Valid	Kaim et al.	Early Cretaceous to late Eocene		Barbados; Czech Republic; United States	A member of Hokkaidoconchidae. A new genus for "Abyssochrysos" giganteum Kiel et al. (2008); genus also contains "Chemnitzia" eucosmeta Ascher (1906) and two unnamed species from the Eocene of Barbados.	
Athleta (Volutocorbis) lasharii	Sp nov	Valid	Merle et al.	Early Eocene	Lakhra Formation	Pakistan	A member of Volutidae, a species of Athleta.	
Athleta (Volutopupa) citharopsis	Sp nov	Valid	Merle et al.	Early Eocene	Lakhra Formation	Pakistan	A member of Volutidae, a species of Athleta.	
Athleta (Volutospina) biconulata	Sp nov	Valid	Jain	Neogene		India	A member of Volutidae, a species of Athleta.	
Aurantilaria cantaurana	Sp. nov	Valid	Landau & Vermeij	Miocene (Burdigalian)	Cantaure Formation	Venezuela	A member of Fasciolariidae, a species of Aurantilaria.	
Aurantilaria magnospinata	Sp. nov	Valid	Landau & Vermeij	Pliocene		Dominican Republic	A member of Fasciolariidae, a species of Aurantilaria.	
Babella robusta	Sp nov	Valid	Harzhauser	Miocene (Burdigalian)		India	A species of Babella.	
Bandelastraea	Nom. nov	Valid	Nützel & Kaim	Late Triassic (early Carnian)	Cassian Formation	Italy	A member of Turbinidae; a replacement name for Cassianastraea Bandel (1993) (preoccupied).	
Belonimorphis kronenbergi	Sp nov	Valid	Harzhauser	Miocene (Burdigalian)		India	A species of Belonimorphis.	
Bernaya angystoma italica	Subsp. nov	Valid	Zamberlan & Checchi	Eocene		Italy	A member of the family Cypraeidae.	
Bernaya media vicetina	Subsp. nov	Valid	Zamberlan & Checchi	Eocene		Italy	A member of the family Cypraeidae.	
Biplex alanbeui	Sp nov	Valid	Harzhauser	Miocene (Burdigalian)		India	A species of Biplex.	
Bolma paratethyca	Sp. nov	Valid	Harzhauser & Landau in Harzhauser et al.	Early Miocene (Ottnangian)	Ottnang Formation	Austria	A member of Turbinidae, a species of Bolma.	
Bothropoma mediocarinata	Sp nov	Valid	Reich & Wesselingh in Reich, Wesselingh & Renema	Early Miocene (early Burdigalian)		Indonesia	A member of Colloniidae, a species of Bothropoma.	
Bothropoma pseudomunda	Sp nov	Valid	Harzhauser	Miocene (Burdigalian)	Warkalli Formation	India	A member of Colloniidae, a species of Bothropoma.	
Bulicingulina pharos	Sp nov	Valid	Harzhauser	Miocene (Burdigalian)		India	A species of Bulicingulina.	
Bursa gajaensis	Sp nov	Valid	Jain	Neogene		India	A species of Bursa.	
Calliotropis (Riselloidea) keideli	Sp. nov	Valid	Ferrari, Kaim & Damborenea	Early Jurassic		Argentina	A member of Eucyclidae, a species of Calliotropis.	
Calliovarica rangiaotea	Sp. nov	Valid	Stilwell	Late Paleocene or early Eocene		New Zealand	A member of Chilodontaidae.	
Calzadina	Gen. et sp. nov	Valid	Forner i Valls	Early Cretaceous (Albian)		Spain	A member of Euomphalidae. The type species is C. segurai.	
Carinilda	Gen nov	Valid	Gründel	Jurassic (Toarcian to Aalenian)		Germany		
Carinofusus	Gen. et comb. nov	Valid	Ceulemans, Landau & Van Dingenen	Latest Miocene to early Pliocene		France	A relative of members of the genus Fusinus. The type species is Carinofusus neogenicus (Cossmann, 1901).	
Cellana? danningeri	Sp. nov	Valid	Harzhauser & Landau in Harzhauser et al.	Early Miocene (Ottnangian)	Ottnang Formation	Austria	A member of Nacellidae, possibly a species of Cellana.	
Cerithideopsis harzhauseri	Sp nov	Valid	Dominici & Kowalke	Eocene (late Ypresian)		Spain	A member of Potamididae, a species of Cerithideopsis.	
Cerithideopsis roselli	Sp nov	Valid	Dominici & Kowalke	Eocene (late Ypresian)		Spain	A member of Potamididae, a species of Cerithideopsis.	
Cerithidium channakodiense	Sp nov	Valid	Harzhauser	Miocene (Burdigalian)		India	A species of Cerithidium.	
Cerithium agervallensis	Sp nov	Valid	Dominici & Kowalke	Eocene (middle and late Ypresian)		Spain	A member of Cerithiidae, a species of Cerithium.	
Chartronella atuelensis	Sp. nov	Valid	Ferrari	Early Jurassic (Hettangian)	Puesto Araya Formation	Argentina	A member of Ataphridae, a species of Chartronella.	
Chartronella gradata	Sp. nov	Valid	Ferrari	Early Jurassic (late Pliensbachian–early Toarcian)	Mulanguiñeu Formation	Argentina	A member of Ataphridae, a species of Chartronella.	
Chilodonta? reticulata	Sp. nov	Valid	Kaim et al.	Early Cretaceous (Valanginian)	Crack Canyon Formation	United States	A member of Chilodontaidae, possibly a species of Chilodonta.	
Chrysallida malabarica	Sp nov	Valid	Harzhauser	Miocene (Burdigalian)		India	A species of Chrysallida.	
Circulus keralaensis	Sp nov	Valid	Harzhauser	Miocene (Burdigalian)		India	A species of Circulus.	
Cirsotrema decaspiratum	Sp nov	Valid	Jain	Neogene		India	A species of Cirsotrema.	
Clathrofenella indica	Sp nov	Valid	Harzhauser	Miocene (Burdigalian)		India	A species of Clathrofenella.	
Claviscala norica	Sp. nov	Valid	Harzhauser & Landau in Harzhauser et al.	Early Miocene (Ottnangian)	Ottnang Formation	Austria	A wentletrap, a species of Claviscala.	
Clelandella sovisi	Sp nov	Valid	Harzhauser	Miocene (Burdigalian)		India	A species of Clelandella.	
Colpomphalus musacchioi	Sp. nov	Valid	Ferrari	Early Jurassic (early Toarcian)	Osta Arena Formation	Argentina	A member of Discohelicidae, a species of Colpomphalus.	
Conomodulus	Gen. et comb. et sp. nov	Valid	Landau, Vermeij & Reich	Miocene-recent		Indonesia; New Caledonia	A member of Modulidae. The type species is the Miocene species "Modulus" preangerensis Martin (1905); genus also includes new species C. renemai, also from the Miocene. Lozouet & Krygelmans (2016) described an extant species Conomodulus neocaledonensis.	
Constricta sarmatica	Sp nov	Valid	Nordsieck	Miocene		Austria	A member of Clausiliidae, a species of Constricta.	
Conus (Lithoconus) gajensis	Sp nov	Valid	Jain	Neogene		India	A species of Conus.	
Costatohelix	Gen. et comb. nov	Valid	Gründel & Hostettler	Jurassic (Hettangian to Oxfordian)		France; Germany; Italy; Russia; Switzerland; United Kingdom	A member of Discohelicidae. The type species is "Discohelix" guembeli Ammon (1893); genus also contains "Discohelix" alternata Gerasimov, 1992 sensu Guzhov (2009), "Discohelix" (Discohelix) bidentata Kästle (1990), "Discohelix" dunkeri (Moore, 1867) sensu Dumortier (1874), "Discohelix" exigua Brösamlen (1909), "Discohelix" (Discohelix) sp., cf. guembeli Ammon, 1893 sensu Wendt (1968), "Discohelix" orbis Reuss, 1852 var. ornata Hörnes, 1853 sensu Gemmellaro (1911), "Discohelix" pulchrior (Hudleston, 1893) sensu Conti & Monari (2001), "Discohelix" rogari Guzhov (2009), "Straparollus" sappho d'Orbigny (1823), "Discohelix" spinosus Wright, MS sensu Hudleston (1893) and "Straparollus" "tuberculosus-dexter" Thorent sensu Hudleston (1893).	
Cryptaenia globosa	Sp. nov	Valid	Ferrari	Early Jurassic (late Pliensbachian)	Puesto Araya Formation	Argentina	A member of Vetigastropoda belonging to the family Ptychomphalidae, a species of Cryptaenia.	
Cryptaenia sudamericana	Sp. nov	Valid	Ferrari	Early Jurassic (Pliensbachian to Toarcian)	Piedra Pintada Formation; Puesto Araya Formation	Argentina	A member of Vetigastropoda belonging to the family Ptychomphalidae, a species of Cryptaenia.	
Dermomurex (Viator) teschlernicolae	Sp nov	Valid	Harzhauser	Miocene (Burdigalian)		India	A species of Dermomurex.	
Dicroloma tenuistriata	Sp. nov	Valid	Guzhov	Late Jurassic		Russia	A member of Aporrhaidae, a species of Dicroloma.	
Dimorphosoma weaveri	Sp. nov	Valid	Cataldo	Early Cretaceous	Neuquén Basin	Argentina	A member of Aporrhaidae, a species of Dimorphosoma.	
Discohelix (Amerevohelix) alekseevi	Subgen. et sp. nov	Valid	Guzhov	Middle Jurassic (middle Callovian)		Russia	A member of Discohelicidae, a subgenus and species of Discohelix. The subgenus also contains the species Discohelix (Amerevohelix) annelus (Yamnichenko, 1987) from the late Bajocian of Ukraine.	
Discohelix sanicoensis	Sp. nov	Valid	Ferrari	Early Jurassic (Pliensbachian)	Piedra Pintada Formation	Argentina	A member of Discohelicidae, a species of Discohelix.	
Discotectonica nuda	Sp nov	Valid	Harzhauser	Miocene (Burdigalian)		India	A species of Discotectonica.	
Discus rasseri	Sp. nov	Valid	Harzhauser, Neubauer & Georgopoulou in Harzhauser et al.	Early Miocene		Czech Republic; Germany?	A member of Discidae, a species of Discus.	
"Discus" schneideri	Sp nov	Valid	Harzhauser & Neubauer in Harzhauser et al.	Middle Miocene		Austria	Originally described as a possible species of Discus; subsequently assigned to the discid genus Manganellia instead.	
Discus zagorseki	Sp. nov	Valid	Harzhauser, Neubauer & Georgopoulou in Harzhauser et al.	Early Miocene		Czech Republic	A member of Discidae, a species of Discus.	
Eohormotomina	Gen. et sp. nov	Valid	Frey et al.	Early Devonian (Pragian)		Morocco	A murchisoniid. The type species is Eohormotomina restisevoluta.	
Epitonium (Pupiscala) kronenbergi	Sp nov	Valid	Jain	Neogene		India	A species of Epitonium.	
Esuinella	Gen. et comb. nov	Valid	Harzhauser, Neubauer & Georgopoulou in Harzhauser et al.	Late Oligocene to middle Miocene		Czech Republic; Germany; Hungary; Poland	A member of Valloniidae; a new genus for "Helix" nana Braun in Walchner (1851).	
Euconulus styriacus	Sp nov	Valid	Harzhauser, Neubauer & Binder in Harzhauser et al.	Middle Miocene		Austria	A species of Euconulus.	
Eulimella reuteri	Sp nov	Valid	Harzhauser	Miocene (Burdigalian)		India	A species of Eulimella.	
Euroscaphella	Gen. et comb. et sp. nov	Valid	Van Dingenen, Ceulemans & Landau	Paleocene to Pliocene		Australia; Belgium; Denmark; France; Germany; Netherlands; Portugal; Russia; Spain; United Kingdom; United States	A volute. Genus includes "Scaphella" baudoni Deshayes (1865), "Voluta" bolli Koch (1862), "Scaphella" carlae Landau & Silva (2006), "Voluta" crenistria von Koenen (1885), "Voluta" faxensis Ravn (1902), "Scaphella" honi Glibert (1938), "Scaphella" johannae Darragh (1988), "Voluta" lamberti Sowerby (1816), "Caricella" leana Dall (1890), "Voluta" miocaenica Fischer & Tournouer (1879), "Voluta" showalteri Aldrich (1886), "Voluta" siemssenii Boll (1851), "Voluta" tarbelliana Grateloup (1840), "Scaphella" veliocassina Pacaud & Meyer (2014), "Scaphella" vignyensis Chavan (1949), "Voluta" volginica Netschaew (1897), "Scaphella" volvestrensis Villatte (1962) and "Voluta" wetherellii Sowerby (1836), as well as new species Euroscaphella namnetensis.	
Euspirocrommium nantoialense	Sp. nov	Valid	Pacaud & Ledon	Eocene (Ypresian)		France	A member of the family Ampullinidae.	
Euterebra kachharai	Sp nov	Valid	Jain	Neogene		India	A species of Euterebra.	
Falsamotrochus	Gen. et sp. et comb. nov	Valid	Gründel & Hostettler	Middle Jurassic (Aalenian to Bathonian)		France; Switzerland; United Kingdom	A member of Nododelphinulidae. The type species is Falsamotrochus angulatus; genus also includes "Trochus" duryanus d'Orbigny (1853), "Trochus" subduplicatus d'Orbigny, 1850 var. abbas Hudleston (1894), "Trochus" substrigosus Hudleston (1894), "Trochus" winwoodi Tawney, 1874 var. minor and major Hudleston (1894) and "Amphitrochus" abbas (Hudleston, 1894) sensu Conti & Monari (2001).	
Finella bruchae	Sp nov	Valid	Harzhauser	Miocene (Burdigalian)		India	A species of Finella.	
Frechenia rhenana	Sp. nov	Valid	Nordsieck	Pliocene		Germany	A member of Helicidae, a species of Frechenia.	
Fusinus roetzeli	Sp nov	Valid	Harzhauser	Miocene (Burdigalian)		India	A species of Fusinus.	
Galeodea globosa	Sp nov	Valid	Jain	Neogene		India	A species of Galeodea.	
Galeodinopsis germanica	Sp nov	Valid	Garilli & Parrinello	Late Oligocene (Chattian)		Germany	A rissoid, a species of Galeodinopsis.	
Gibborissoia inexpectata	Sp nov	Valid	Harzhauser	Miocene (Burdigalian)		India	A species of Gibborissoia.	
Granulolabium pyrenaicum	Sp nov	Valid	Dominici & Kowalke	Eocene (late Ypresian)		Spain	A member of Batillariidae, a species of Granulolabium.	
Guidonia disciformis	Sp. nov	Valid	Ferrari	Early Jurassic (Pliensbachian)	Piedra Pintada Formation	Argentina	A member of Nododelphinulidae, a species of Guidonia.	
Gyraulus krohi	Sp nov	Valid	Neubauer & Harzhauser in Harzhauser et al.	Middle Miocene		Austria	A species of Gyraulus.	
Gyraulus okrugljakensis	Nom. nov	Valid	Neubauer et al.	Late Miocene		Croatia	A member of Planorbidae; a replacement name for Planorbis clathratus Brusina (1884).	
Gyraulus rasseri	Nom. nov	Valid	Neubauer et al.	Early Pliocene		Kosovo	A member of Planorbidae; a replacement name for Planorbis discoideus Pavlović (1903).	
Gyraulus vrapceanus	Nom. nov	Valid	Neubauer et al.	Late Miocene		Croatia	A member of Planorbidae; a replacement name for Planorbis dubius Gorjanović-Kramberger (1890).	
Hamusina? wahnishae	Sp. nov	Valid	Ferrari	Early Jurassic (late Pliensbachian–early Toarcian)	Mulanguiñeu Formation	Argentina	A member of Cirridae, possibly a species of Hamusina.	
Hauffenia mandici	Sp nov	Valid	Neubauer & Harzhauser in Harzhauser et al.	Middle Miocene		Austria	A species of Hauffenia.	
Haustator ashtamudensis	Sp nov	Valid	Harzhauser	Miocene (Burdigalian)	Warkalli Formation	India	A member of Turritellidae, a species of Haustator.	
Helenostylina convexa	Sp. nov	Valid	Nützel & Kaim	Late Triassic (early Carnian)	Cassian Formation	Italy	A member of Coelostylinidae, a species of Helenostylina.	
Heliacus (Torinista) goehlichae	Sp nov	Valid	Harzhauser	Miocene (Burdigalian)		India	A species of Heliacus.	
Hikidea	Gen. et sp. et comb. nov	Valid	Kaim et al.	Cretaceous (Valanginian to Campanian)		Japan; United States	A possible member of Colloniidae. The type species is Hikidea osoensis; genus also contains "Cantrainea" yasukawensis Kaim et al. (2009), and "Cantrainea" omagariensis Kaim et al. (2009).	
Humptulipsia nobuharai	Sp. nov	Valid	Kaim et al.	Late Cretaceous (Campanian-Maastrichian)	Sada Limestone	Japan	A member of Hokkaidoconchidae, a species of Humptulipsia.	
Indomodulus miocenicum	Sp. nov	Valid	Landau, Vermeij & Reich	Miocene		Indonesia	A member of Modulidae.	
Indomodulus pseudotectum	Sp. nov	Valid	Landau, Vermeij & Reich	Miocene		Indonesia	A member of Modulidae.	
Jujubinus keralaensis	Sp nov	Valid	Harzhauser	Miocene (Burdigalian)		India	A species of Jujubinus.	
Julia walochnikae	Sp nov	Valid	Harzhauser	Miocene (Burdigalian)	Warkalli Formation	India	A member of Juliidae, a species of Julia.	
Jurilda kremmeldorfensis	Sp nov	Valid	Gründel	Jurassic (Toarcian to Aalenian)		Germany	A species of Jurilda.	
Kangilioptera inouei	Sp nov	Valid	Amano & Jenkins	Paleocene	Katsuhira Formation	Japan	A member of Aporrhaidae, a species of Kangilioptera.	
Kermia bulbosa	Sp nov	Valid	Harzhauser	Miocene (Burdigalian)		India	A species of Kermia.	
Laevimodulus	Gen. et 2 sp. nov	Valid	Landau, Vermeij & Reich	Miocene-Pliocene		Dominican Republic	A member of Modulidae. Genus includes new species L. canae and L. gurabensis.	
Laevityphis jungi	Sp. nov	Valid	Landau & Houart	Miocene (Burdigalian)	Cantaure Formation	Venezuela	A member of Muricidae, a species of Laevityphis.	
Laubetrochus	Gen. et comb. nov	Valid	Gründel & Hostettler	Jurassic (Bathonian to Oxfordian)		Poland; Russia	A member of Nododelphinulidae. The type species is "Costatrochus" laubei Gründel (2012); genus also includes "Calliostoma" alsatica (Andreae, 1887) sensu Gerasimov (1955).	
Leptomaria nicsimoni	Sp. nov	Valid	Monari & Gatto	Middle Jurassic (early Bajocian)		Luxembourg	A pleurotomariid, a species of Leptomaria.	
Liloa pilleri	Sp nov	Valid	Harzhauser	Miocene (Burdigalian)	Warkalli Formation	India	A member of Haminoeidae, a species of Liloa.	
Lithoglyphus gozhiki	Nom. nov	Valid	Neubauer et al.	Late Miocene		Ukraine	A member of Lithoglyphidae; a replacement name for Lithoglyphus maeoticus Gozhik in Gozhik & Datsenko (2007).	
Lyriopsis	Gen. et comb. nov	Valid	Merle et al.	Early Eocene	Lakhra Formation	Pakistan	A member of Volutidae. The type species is Lyriopsis cossmanni (Vredenburg, 1923).	
Lyrischapa brevispira	Sp nov	Valid	Merle et al.	Early Eocene	Lakhra Formation	Pakistan	A member of Volutidae, a species of Lyrischapa.	
Lyrischapa vredenburgi	Sp nov	Valid	Merle et al.	Early Eocene	Lakhra Formation	Pakistan	A member of Volutidae, a species of Lyrischapa.	
Macrogastra reischuetzi	Sp. nov	Valid	Nordsieck	Miocene		Austria	A member of Clausiliidae, a species of Macrogastra.	
Macrogastra voesendorfensis hautzendorfensis	Subsp. nov	Valid	Nordsieck	Miocene		Austria	A member of Clausiliidae, a subspecies of Macrogastra voesendorfensis.	
Macrozonites maillardi	Sp. nov	Valid	Grimm et al.	Miocene	Eppelsheim Formation	Germany	A member of Zonitidae, a species of Macrozonites.	
Manganellia	Gen. et comb. nov	Valid	Harzhauser, Neubauer & Georgopoulou in Harzhauser et al.	Early to middle Miocene		Austria; Czech Republic	A member of Discidae. A new genus for "Patula" alata Klika (1891); genus also contains "Discus" schneideri Harzhauser & Neubauer in Harzhauser et al. (2014).	
Megastomia quilonica	Sp nov	Valid	Harzhauser	Miocene (Burdigalian)		India	A species of Megastomia.	
Melanopsis anistratenkoi	Nom. nov	Valid	Neubauer et al.	Pliocene (Zanclean)		Abkhazia	A member of Melanopsidae; a replacement name for Melanopsis (Duabiana) cylindrica Anistratenko (1993).	
Melanopsis cuisiensis	Sp nov	Valid	Dominici & Kowalke	Eocene (late Ypresian)		Spain	A member of Melanopsidae, a species of Melanopsis.	
Melanopsis fateljensis	Sp. nov	Valid	Neubauer, Mandic & Harzhauser	Miocene (early Langhian)	Kupres Basin	Bosnia and Herzegovina	A member of Melanopsidae, a species of Melanopsis.	
Melanopsis gearyae	Nom. nov	Valid	Neubauer et al.	Pliocene or Pleistocene		Greece	A member of Melanopsidae; a replacement name for Melanopsis eleis posterior Schütt in Symeonidis et al. (1986).	
Melanopsis haueri ripanjensis	Nom. nov	Valid	Neubauer et al.	Late Miocene		Serbia	A member of Melanopsidae; a replacement name for Melanopsis austriaca serbica Brusina (1902).	
Melanopsis magyari	Nom. nov	Valid	Neubauer et al.	Miocene (Tortonian)		Serbia	A member of Melanopsidae; a replacement name for Melanopsis klerići inermis Brusina (1897).	
Melanopsis vrcinensis	Nom. nov	Valid	Neubauer et al.	Miocene (Tortonian)		Serbia	A member of Melanopsidae; a replacement name for Melanopsis (Melanoptychia) glabra Pavlović (1927).	
Melanopsis wolfgangfischeri	Nom. nov	Valid	Neubauer et al.	Late Miocene		Austria	A member of Melanopsidae; a replacement name for Melanopsis rugosa (Handmann, 1887).	
Menesthella quilonica	Sp nov	Valid	Harzhauser	Miocene (Burdigalian)		India	A species of Menesthella.	
Micrancilla antipodarum	Sp. nov	Valid	Pacaud	Eocene (Lutetian)		France	An olive snail.	
Micratys ostiolum	Sp nov	Valid	Harzhauser	Miocene (Burdigalian)	Warkalli Formation	India	A member of Haminoeidae, a species of Micratys.	
Microdaphne indohystrix	Sp nov	Valid	Harzhauser	Miocene (Burdigalian)		India	A species of Microdaphne.	
Micromelania ramacanensis	Nom. nov	Valid	Neubauer et al.	Late Miocene		Serbia	A member of Hydrobiidae; a replacement name for Micromelania brusinai Pavlović (1927).	
Minacilla	Gen. et comb. nov	Valid	Nordsieck	Late Oligocene		Germany	A member of Vertiginidae; a new genus for "Lauria" minax Boettger (1889).	
Miodiscula	Gen. et comb. nov	Valid	Nordsieck	Middle Miocene		Germany	Possibly a member of Helicodontidae. The type species is "Trochoidea" miocaenica Gottschick & Wenz (1927); genus also includes Canariella disciformis sensu Schlickum (1976).	
Mitreola brohii	Sp nov	Valid	Merle et al.	Early Eocene	Lakhra Formation	Pakistan	A member of Volutidae, a species of Mitreola.	
Mitromorpha bellula	Sp nov	Valid	Harzhauser	Miocene (Burdigalian)		India	A species of Mitromorpha.	
Monophorus invectus	Sp nov	Valid	Harzhauser	Miocene (Burdigalian)		India	A species of Monophorus.	
Monoplex kritscheri	Sp nov	Valid	Harzhauser	Miocene (Burdigalian)		India	A species of Monoplex.	
Muellerpalia haszprunari	Nom. nov	Valid	Neubauer et al.	Late Miocene		Hungary	A member of Hydrobiidae; a replacement name for Valvata simplex Fuchs (1870).	
Muellerpalia pseudovalvatoides	Nom. nov	Valid	Neubauer et al.	Late Miocene		Hungary	A member of Hydrobiidae; a replacement name for Valvata carinata Fuchs (1870).	
Multiptyxis angolensis	Sp. nov	Valid	Calzada & Corbacho	Early Cretaceous (Albian)		Angola	A member of Nerinellidae, a species of Multiptyxis.	
Nassaria harzhauseri	Sp nov	Valid	Jain	Neogene		India	A species of Nassaria.	
Nassarius beui	Sp nov	Valid	Jain	Neogene		India	A species of Nassarius.	
Nassarius bhatiyaensis	Sp nov	Valid	Jain	Neogene		India	A species of Nassarius.	
Natica (Cochlis) manipurensis	Sp. nov	Valid	Sijagurumayum, Singh & Kachhara	Eocene	Disang Formation	India	A species of Natica.	
Negulopsis	Gen. et comb. nov	Valid	Nordsieck	Late Oligocene to early Pleistocene		Austria; Czech Republic; France; Germany; Hungary; Italy; Poland; Slovakia	A member of Vertiginidae. The type species is "Pupa" suturalis Sandberger (1858); genus also includes "Vertigo" bleicheri Paladilhe (1873), "Pupa" raricostata Slavík (1869) "Vertigo" villafranchiana Sacco (1886), "Negulus" truci Schlickum (1975) and possibly "Pupa" novigentiensis Sandberger (1872).	
Neritilia lawsoni	Sp. nov	Valid	Symonds & Tracey	Eocene (early Ypresian)	Blackheath Formation	United Kingdom	A member of Neritiliidae, a species of Neritilia.	
Nordsieckula	Gen. et comb. nov	Valid	Harl & Harzhauser in Harzhauser et al.	Late Oligocene to middle Miocene		Czech Republic; Germany	A member of Orculidae. A new genus for "Pupa" subconica Sandberger (1858); genus also contains "Orcula" falkneri Hausdorf (1995).	
Obtortio wesselinghi	Sp nov	Valid	Harzhauser	Miocene (Burdigalian)	Warkalli Formation	India	A member of Cerithioidea belonging to the family Obtortionidae, a species of Obtortio.	
Ocenebra etteri	Sp. nov	Valid	Landau & Houart	Miocene (Burdigalian)	Cantaure Formation	Venezuela	A member of Muricidae, a species of Ocenebra.	
Oriomphalus multiornatus	Sp. nov	Valid	Frey et al.	Early Devonian (Pragian)		Morocco	Possibly a member of Oriostomatidae, a species of Oriomphalus.	
Pachycrommium abbencuriense	Sp. nov	Valid	Pacaud & Ledon	Paleocene (Thanetian)		France	A member of the family Ampullinidae.	
Pachycrommium gabayense	Sp. nov	Valid	Pacaud & Ledon	Eocene (Bartonian)		France	A member of the family Ampullinidae.	
Pachyretinella	Gen. et comb. nov	Valid	Nordsieck	Pliocene		Germany	A member of Oxychilidae. The type species is "Omphalosagda" sandbergeri Schlickum & Strauch (1979)	
Pagodatrochus boehmae	Sp nov	Valid	Harzhauser	Miocene (Burdigalian)		India	A species of Pagodatrochus.	
Pakiluta	Gen. et sp. nov	Valid	Merle et al.	Early Eocene	Lakhra Formation	Pakistan	A member of Volutidae. The type species is Pakiluta solangii.	
Palaeomastus	Gen. et comb. nov	Valid	Nordsieck	Early Oligocene to Miocene		Austria; Czech Republic; France; Germany; Romania; Switzerland	A member of Enidae. The type species is "Bulimus" gracilis Thomä (1845); genus also includes "Bulimus" complanatus Reuss (1849), "Bulimus" filocinctus Reuss (1860), "Bulimus" matheyi Maillard (1892), "Buliminus" suevicus Wenz (1916), "Buliminus" hassiacus Wenz (1919), "Ena (Napaeus)" gaali Wenz (1919) and "Bulimus" arneggensis Miller (1907).	
Palmerella kutchensis	Sp nov	Valid	Halder & Sinha	Eocene (lower Middle Eocene)	Harudi Formation	India	A member of Turritellidae, a species of Palmerella.	Palmerella kutchensis
Paradrobacia	Gen. et comb. nov	Valid	Nordsieck	Middle Miocene to Pliocene		Austria; Bosnia and Herzegovina; Germany; Greece	A member of Helicidae. The type species is "Josephinella" thiedei Schlickum & Strauch (1972); genus also includes "Josephinella" pontica Schütt (1976) and "Josephinella" dehmi Schlickum (1977).	
Paskentana hamiltonensis	Sp. nov	Valid	Kaim et al.	Early Cretaceous (Valanginian)	Crack Canyon Formation	United States	A paskentanid abyssochrysoid, a species of Paskentana.	
Peraubium	Gen. et comb. nov	Valid	Dominici & Kowalke	Eocene (middle and late Ypresian)		France; Spain	A member of Cerithiidae; a new genus for "Goniobasis" vidali Cossmann (1906).	
Perrinia krohi	Sp nov	Valid	Harzhauser	Miocene (Burdigalian)		India	A species of Perrinia.	
Phanerolepida onoensis	Sp. nov	Valid	Kaim et al.	Early Cretaceous (late Barremian)	Budden Canyon Formation	United States	A member of Turbinidae, a species of Phanerolepida.	
"Philine" pulvinifera	Sp nov	Valid	Harzhauser	Miocene (Burdigalian)		India	Possibly a species of Philine.	
Planorbarius halavatsi	Nom. nov	Valid	Neubauer et al.	Late Miocene		Hungary	A member of Planorbidae; a replacement name for Planorbis grandis Halaváts (1903).	
Plesiotrochus hasibuani	Sp nov	Valid	Reich & Wesselingh in Reich, Wesselingh & Renema	Early Miocene (early Burdigalian)		Indonesia	A member of Plesiotrochidae, a species of Plesiotrochus.	
Pleurodiscoides	Gen. et 2 subgen. et comb. nov	Valid	Nordsieck	Late Oligocene to Miocene		Czech Republic; Germany; Hungary; Poland	A member of Pleurodiscidae. Genus contains two subgenera: P. (Pleurodiscoides) from Miocene (type species "Helix" falcifera Boettger (1870); also includes P. orbicularis (Klein), "Pyramidula" mamillata Andreae (1904) and "Pleurodiscus" falkneri Schlickum (1978)) and P. (Oligopleurodiscus) from Oligocene (type species Goniodiscus wenzi Pfeffer; also includes P. frici (Klika)).	
Pleurofusia wanzenboecki	Sp nov	Valid	Harzhauser	Miocene (Burdigalian)		India	A species of Pleurofusia.	
Polygona geeratvermeiji	Nom. nov	Valid	Landau et al.	Miocene (Serravallian)	Tırtar Formation	Turkey	A species of Polygona; the replacement name for Polygona vermeiji Landau et al. (2013) (preoccupied).	
Potamides archiaci	Sp nov	Valid	Halder & Sinha	Eocene (lower Middle Eocene)	Harudi Formation	India	A member of Potamididae, a species of Potamides.	Potamides archiaci
Potamides isabenense	Sp nov	Valid	Dominici & Kowalke	Eocene (late Ypresian)		Spain	A member of Potamididae, a species of Potamides.	
Proconulus? argentinus	Sp. nov	Valid	Ferrari	Early Jurassic (Pliensbachian)	Piedra Pintada Formation	Argentina	A member of Proconulidae, possibly a species of Proconulus.	
Protriloba	Gen. et comb. nov	Valid	Nordsieck	Middle to late Miocene		Macedonia; Poland	A member of Clausiliidae. The type species is "Triloba" pappi Schnabel (2012); genus also includes "Triloba" magurkai Stworzewicz in Stworzewicz, Prisyazhnyuk & Górka (2013).	
Provanna alexi	Sp nov	Valid	Amano & Little	Lower Middle Miocene	Chikubetsu Formation	Japan	A species of Provanna.	Provanna alexi
Provanna hirokoae	Sp nov	Valid	Amano & Little	Middle Miocene	Ogaya Formation	Japan	A species of Provanna.	Provanna hirokoae
Pseudamnicola welterschultesi	Nom. nov	Valid	Neubauer et al.	Pliocene		Greece	A member of Hydrobiidae; a replacement name for Valvata minima Fuchs (1877).	
Pseudaulicina coxi	Sp nov	Valid	Merle et al.	Early Eocene	Lakhra Formation	Pakistan	A member of Volutidae, a species of Pseudaulicina.	
Pseudobellardia muttii	Sp nov	Valid	Dominici & Kowalke	Eocene (late Ypresian)		Spain	A member of Pachychilidae, a species of Pseudobellardia.	
Pseudocochlespira gramensis	Sp. nov	Valid	Schnetler & Grant	Miocene (Tortonian)	Gram Clay Formation	Denmark	A member of Cochlespiridae, a species of Pseudocochlespira.	
Pyreneola lukenederi	Sp nov	Valid	Harzhauser	Miocene (Burdigalian)		India	A species of Pyreneola.	
Pyrgula rusti	Nom. nov	Valid	Neubauer et al.	Miocene (Messinian)	Trilophos Formation	Greece	A member of Hydrobiidae; a replacement name for Micromelania carinata Gillet & Geissert (1971).	
Pyrunculus metaformis	Sp nov	Valid	Harzhauser	Miocene (Burdigalian)		India	A member of Retusidae, a species of Pyrunculus.	
Radiodiscus sanrafaelensis	Sp nov	Valid	Turazzini & Miquel	Early Pliocene	Aisol Formation	Argentina	A member of Charopidae, a species of Radiodiscus.	
Radix enzenbachensis	Sp nov	Valid	Neubauer & Harzhauser in Harzhauser et al.	Middle Miocene		Austria	A species of Radix.	
Radix macaleti	Nom. nov	Valid	Neubauer et al.	Latest Miocene to earliest Pliocene		Romania	A member of Lymnaeidae; a replacement name for Radix socialis Macaleț (2000).	
Rasatomaria	Gen. et sp. nov	Valid	Pieroni & Nützel	Middle Triassic (latest Anisian)	San Salvatore Formation	Italy	A member of Pleurotomarioidea. The type species is Rasatomaria gentilii.	
Retusa ashtamudiensis	Sp nov	Valid	Harzhauser	Miocene (Burdigalian)		India	A species of Retusa.	
Ringicula quilonica	Sp nov	Valid	Harzhauser	Miocene (Burdigalian)		India	A species of Ringicula.	
Rissoina (Rissoina) banyungantiensis	Sp nov	Valid	Reich & Wesselingh in Reich, Wesselingh & Renema	Early Miocene (early Burdigalian)		Indonesia	A member of Rissoidae, a species of Rissoina.	
Rissolina landaui	Sp nov	Valid	Harzhauser	Miocene (Burdigalian)		India	A species of Rissolina.	
Rissolina reticuspiralis	Sp nov	Valid	Reich & Wesselingh in Reich, Wesselingh & Renema	Early Miocene (early Burdigalian)		Indonesia	A member of Rissoidae, a species of Rissolina.	
Scaliola subbella	Sp nov	Valid	Harzhauser	Miocene (Burdigalian)		India	A species of Scaliola.	
Scaliola vastifica	Sp nov	Valid	Harzhauser	Miocene (Burdigalian)		India	A species of Scaliola.	
Scaphella veliocassina	Sp. nov	Valid	Pacaud & Meyer	Paleocene (Danian)		Belgium; Denmark; France	A volute. Originally described as a species of Scaphella; subsequently transferred to the genus Euroscaphella.	
Schartia	Gen. et sp. nov	Valid	Nützel & Kaim	Late Triassic (early Carnian)	Cassian Formation	Italy	A member of Heterobranchia, possibly a tofanellid. The type species is Schartia carinata.	
Scutellastra arayae	Sp. nov	Valid	Nielsen & Landau	Early Miocene	Navidad Formation	Chile	A member of Patellidae, a species of Scutellastra.	
Scutellastra venezuelana	Sp. nov	Valid	Nielsen & Landau	Miocene (late Burdigalian-early Langhian)	Cantaure Formation	Venezuela	A member of Patellidae, a species of Scutellastra.	
Segmentina mosbachensis	Nom. nov	Valid	Neubauer et al.	Early Pleistocene		Germany	A member of Planorbidae; a replacement name for Planorbis (Segmentina) micromphalus Sandberger (1875).	
Semicassis vredenburgi	Sp nov	Valid	Jain	Neogene		India	A species of Semicassis.	
Serrulastra (Serruplica) tuchoricensis	Nom. nov	Valid	Harzhauser et al.	Early Miocene		Czech Republic	A member of Clausiliidae, a species of Serrulastra; a replacement name for Clausilia laevigata Frankenberger (1914).	
Sigaretotrema spiratum	Sp nov	Valid	Jain	Neogene		India	A member of Naticidae, a species of Sigaretotrema.	
Sindhiluta	Gen. et sp. nov	Valid	Merle et al.	Early Eocene	Lakhra Formation	Pakistan	A member of Volutidae. The type species is Sindhiluta lakhraensis.	
Siratus harzhauseri	Sp. nov	Valid	Landau & Houart	Miocene (Burdigalian)	Cantaure Formation	Venezuela	A member of Muricidae, a species of Siratus.	
Skenea indica	Sp nov	Valid	Harzhauser	Miocene (Burdigalian)		India	A species of Skenea.	
Solariella keralaenis	Sp nov	Valid	Harzhauser	Miocene (Burdigalian)		India	A species of Solariella.	
Striatoconulus? axialis	Sp. nov	Valid	Ferrari	Early Jurassic (Pliensbachian)	Piedra Pintada Formation	Argentina	A member of Ataphridae, possibly a species of Striatoconulus.	
Struthiochenopus echtleri	Sp nov	Valid	Nielsen & Encinas	Neogene		Chile	A member of Aporrhaidae, a species of Struthiochenopus.	
Teinostoma mandici	Sp nov	Valid	Harzhauser	Miocene (Burdigalian)		India	A species of Teinostoma.	
Theodoxus militaris jurisicpolsakae	Nom. nov	Valid	Neubauer et al.	Late Pliocene to early Pleistocene		Croatia	A member of Neritidae; a replacement name for Theodoxus militaris oblongus Jurišić-Polšak (1979).	
Theodoxus pseudodacicus	Nom. nov	Valid	Neubauer et al.	Pliocene (Zanclean)		Romania	A member of Neritidae; a replacement name for Theodoxus (Theodoxus) dacicus Pană (2003).	
Theodoxus stoicai	Nom. nov	Valid	Neubauer et al.	Pliocene (Zanclean)		Romania	A member of Neritidae; a replacement name for Theodoxus (Calvertia) rugosa Pană (2003).	
Trempotamides	Gen. et comb. nov	Valid	Dominici & Kowalke	Eocene (early and middle Ypresian)		Spain	A member of Potamididae. A new genus for "Potamides" imbricatarius Cossmann (1898); genus also contains "Potamides" peraubensis Cossmann (1906) and "Potamides" tactospira Cossmann (1906).	
Trigonopupa	Gen. et comb. nov	Valid	Nordsieck	Oligocene		Germany	A member of Vertiginidae; a new genus for "Pupa" trigonostoma Sandberger (1858).	
Trivia subglobosa	Sp nov	Valid	Jain	Neogene		India	A species of Trivia.	
Trochomodulus paraguanensis	Sp. nov	Valid	Landau, Vermeij & Reich	Miocene	Cantaure Formation	Venezuela	A member of Modulidae.	
Trochus kathiawarensis	Sp nov	Valid	Jain	Neogene		India	A species of Trochus.	
Truncatellina pantherae	Sp nov	Valid	Harzhauser & Neubauer in Harzhauser et al.	Middle Miocene		Austria	A species of Truncatellina.	
Turbo (Marmarostomo?) sanoi	Sp nov	Valid	Tomida & Kadota	Middle Miocene	Sakurada Formation	Japan	A member of Turbinidae, a species of Turbo.	
Turbo (Marmarostomo) yoshiharuyabei	Sp nov	Valid	Tomida & Kadota	Middle Miocene	Sakurada Formation	Japan	A member of Turbinidae, a species of Turbo.	
Turbo (Turbo) hosodai	Sp nov	Valid	Tomida & Kadota	Middle Miocene	Sakurada Formation	Japan	A member of Turbinidae, a species of Turbo.	
Turbonilla lacrimabunda	Sp nov	Valid	Harzhauser	Miocene (Burdigalian)		India	A species of Turbonilla.	
Tympanotonos morillensis	Sp nov	Valid	Dominici & Kowalke	Eocene (late Ypresian)		Spain	A member of Potamididae, a species of Tympanotonos.	
Typhina canaliculata	Sp. nov	Valid	Landau & Houart	Miocene (Burdigalian)	Cantaure Formation	Venezuela	A member of Muricidae, a species of Typhina.	
Unacerithium	Gen nov	Valid	Gründel	Jurassic (Toarcian to Aalenian)		Germany		
Undoriptera	Gen. et sp. nov	Valid	Guzhov	Late Jurassic		Russia	A member of Aporrhaidae. The type species is Undoriptera tridactylus.	
Urticicola schlickumi	Sp. nov	Valid	Nordsieck	Pliocene		Germany	A member of Hygromiidae, a species of Urticicola.	
Valvata heidemariae willmanni	Nom. nov	Valid	Neubauer et al.	Early Pleistocene	Middle Irakli Formation	Greece	A member of Valvatidae; a replacement name for Valvata heidemariae bicarinata Willmann (1981).	
Viviparus deleeuwi	Nom. nov	Valid	Neubauer et al.	Pliocene (Zanclean)		Romania	A member of Viviparidae; a replacement name for Viviparus muscelensis Lubenescu & Zazuleac (1985).	
Viviparus lubenescuae	Nom. nov	Valid	Neubauer et al.	Pliocene (Zanclean)		Romania	A member of Viviparidae; a replacement name for Viviparus conicus Lubenescu & Zazuleac (1985).	
Viviparus stevanovici	Nom. nov	Valid	Neubauer et al.	Late Miocene to early Pliocene		Serbia	A member of Viviparidae; a replacement name for Viviparus elongatus Stevanović (1978).	
Viviparus wesselinghi	Nom. nov	Valid	Neubauer et al.	Pliocene (Zanclean)		Ukraine	A member of Viviparidae; a replacement name for Viviparus neumayri var. incerta Macarovici (1940).	
Volgacheilus	Gen. et sp. nov	Valid	Guzhov	Late Jurassic		Russia	A member of Aporrhaidae. The type species is Volgacheilus rogovi.	
Volutilithes sindhiensis	Sp nov	Valid	Merle et al.	Early Eocene	Lakhra Formation	Pakistan	A member of Volutidae, a species of Volutilithes.	
Volutilithes welcommei	Sp nov	Valid	Merle et al.	Early Eocene	Lakhra Formation	Pakistan	A member of Volutidae, a species of Volutilithes.	
Volvulella staphylemorpha	Sp nov	Valid	Harzhauser	Miocene (Burdigalian)		India	A rhizorid cephalaspidean, a species of Volvulella.	
Xenophora gajensis	Sp nov	Valid	Jain	Neogene		India	A species of Xenophora.	
Zaclys? nuetzeli	Sp. nov	Valid	Lauridsen & Schnetler	Paleocene (middle Danian)	Faxe Formation	Denmark	A member of Cerithiopsidae, possibly a species of Zaclys.	
Zebina zuschini	Sp nov	Valid	Harzhauser	Miocene (Burdigalian)		India	A species of Zebina.	

== Other molluscs ==
Name	Novelty	Status	Authors	Age	Unit	Location	Notes	Images
Acar pseudolamellosa	Sp. nov	Valid	Berezovsky	Late Eocene		Ukraine	An ark clam, a species of Acar.	
Acar viridis	Sp. nov	Valid	Berezovsky	Late Eocene		Ukraine	An ark clam, a species of Acar.	
Agrawalimya tubularis	Sp. nov	Valid	Fürsich & Pan	Jurassic (Callovian–Oxfordian)	Kamar-e-Mehdi Formation	Iran	A bivalve belonging to the family Pholadomyidae, a species of Agrawalimya.	
Agriopleura sequana	Sp. nov	Valid	Masse & Fenerci-Masse	Early Cretaceous (late Hauterivian)		France	A radiolitid rudist, a species of Agriopleura.	
Anadara (Anadara) kathiawarensis	Sp nov	Valid	Jain	Neogene		India	A species of Anadara.	
Anadara (Anadara) subovata	Sp nov	Valid	Jain	Neogene		India	A species of Anadara.	
Annachlamys aequipectiniformis	Sp nov	Valid	Jain	Neogene		India	A species of Annachlamys.	
Archivesica sakoi	Sp. nov	Valid	Amano et al.	Early Miocene	Shikiya Formation	Japan	A member of Vesicomyidae belonging to the subfamily Pliocardiinae, a species of Archivesica.	
Asperarca acuta	Sp. nov	Valid	Berezovsky	Late Eocene	Mandrikovka Beds	Ukraine	An ark clam, a species of Asperarca.	
Asperarca microida	Sp. nov	Valid	Berezovsky	Late Eocene	Mandrikovka Beds	Ukraine	An ark clam, a species of Asperarca.	
Astarte (Digitariopsis) trigonoequilatera	Sp nov	Valid	Jain	Neogene		India	A species of Astarte.	
Aviculoperna changamdabiensis	Sp. nov	Valid	Sijagurumayum, Singh & Kachhara	Eocene	Disang Formation	India	A bakevellid pterioid bivalve, a species of Aviculoperna.	
Camptonectes (Grandinectes) teres	Subgen. et sp. nov	Valid	Fürsich & Pan	Jurassic (Callovian–Oxfordian)	Kamar-e-Mehdi Formation	Iran	A scallop, a species of Camptonectes.	
Cardita ranjitpurensis	Sp nov	Valid	Jain	Neogene		India	A species of Cardita.	
Corbula trigonalis inflata	Subsp nov	Valid	Jain	Neogene		India	A subspecies of Corbula trigonalis.	
Cornellites confluentinus	Sp. nov	Valid	Eichele	Early Devonian		Germany	A bivalve, a species of Cornellites.	
Cornellites quinquecostatus	Sp. nov	Valid	Eichele	Early Devonian		Germany	A bivalve, a species of Cornellites.	
Cornellites siegeniensis	Sp. nov	Valid	Eichele	Early Devonian		Germany	A bivalve, a species of Cornellites.	
Costanuculana godaigoi	Sp. nov	Valid	Matsubara in Matsubara et al.	Miocene	Ichibu Formation	Japan	A nuculanid, a species of Costanuculana.	
Cretaxinus	Gen. et sp. nov	Valid	Hryniewicz, Little & Nakrem	Earliest Cretaceous		Norway	A thyasirid bivalve. The type species is Cretaxinus hurumi.	
Cryptopecten kurangaensis	Sp nov	Valid	Jain	Neogene		India	A species of Cryptopecten.	
Decapecten percostata	Sp nov	Valid	Jain	Neogene		India	A scallop.	
Goniophora rhensiensis	Sp. nov	Valid	Eichele	Early Devonian		Germany	A bivalve, a species of Goniophora.	
Heteropecten paranaensis	Sp. nov	Valid	Neves et al.	Late Palaeozoic	Itararé Group	Brazil	A pectinid, a species of Heteropecten.	
Igorella moncereti	Sp. nov	Valid	Devaere & Clausen in Devaere et al.	Cambrian		France	A member of Helcionelloida, a species of Igorella.	
Indarca	Gen. et comb. nov	Valid	Borkar, Kulkarni & Bhattacharjee-Kapoor	Miocene		India	An ark clam. The type species is "Anadara" gourae Dey (1962); genus also includes "Anadara" quilonensis Dey (1962).	
Inoceramus pictus rabenauensis	Subsp. nov	Valid	Tröger	Late Cretaceous (Cenomanian)		Germany	A bivalve belonging to the family Inoceramidae, a subspecies of Inoceramus pictus.	
Loxocardium gajaensis	Sp nov	Valid	Jain	Neogene		India	A cockle.	
Loxocardium subquadratum	Sp nov	Valid	Jain	Neogene		India	A cockle.	
Lyropecten bardhani	Sp nov	Valid	Jain	Neogene		India	A scallop'.	
Magallanesia	Gen. et sp. nov	Valid	Sano et al.	Early Cretaceous (probably late Albian)		Northwest Pacific Ocean (Takuyo-Daini Seamount); Philippines	A polyconitid rudist. The type species is Magallanesia canaliculata.	
Manasoconus	Gen. et sp. nov	Valid	Peel in Geyer et al.	Cambrian (Amgan)		Kyrgyzstan	A helcionellid. The type species is Manasoconus bifrons.	
Mesosaccella rogovi	Sp. nov	Valid	Hryniewicz, Little & Nakrem	Late Jurassic to earliest Cretaceous		Norway	A malletiid bivalve, a species of Mesosaccella.	
Mesosaccella toddi	Sp. nov	Valid	Hryniewicz, Little & Nakrem	Late Jurassic to earliest Cretaceous		Norway	A malletiid bivalve, a species of Mesosaccella.	
Mimachlamys kathiawarensis	Sp nov	Valid	Jain	Neogene		India	A species of Mimachlamys.	
Musculium miocaenicum	Sp nov	Valid	Neubauer & Harzhauser in Harzhauser et al.	Middle Miocene		Austria	A species of Musculium.	
Mytiloides praeturonicus	Sp. nov	Valid	Tröger	Late Cretaceous (Cenomanian)		Germany	A bivalve belonging to the family Inoceramidae, a species of Mytiloides.	
Nemocardium dwarkadishi	Sp nov	Valid	Jain	Neogene		India	A cockle.	
Notocalyptogena	Gen. et sp. nov	Valid	Amano et al.	Miocene	Bexhaven Limestone; Ihungia Limestone	New Zealand	A bivalve belonging to the family Vesicomyidae and the subfamily Pliocardiinae. The type species is N. neozelandica.	
Nucinella svalbardensis	Sp. nov	Valid	Hryniewicz, Little & Nakrem	Late Jurassic to earliest Cretaceous		Norway	A nucinellid bivalve, a species of Nucinella.	
Ostrea (Ostrea) kharakhetarensis	Sp nov	Valid	Jain	Neogene		India	A species of Ostrea.	
Phrygula	Gen. et comb. nov	Valid	Yang et al.	Cambrian (Terreneuvian)	Zhujiaqing Formation	China	A new genus for "Helcionella" nana Chen & Zhang (1980).	
Protonoetia manipurensis	Sp. nov	Valid	Sijagurumayum, Singh & Kachhara	Eocene	Disang Formation	India	A noetiid bivalve, a species of Protonoetia.	
Pseudomiltha hexagona	Sp nov	Valid	Jain	Neogene		India	A bivalve belonging to the family Lucinidae.	
Semele bamnasaensis	Sp nov	Valid	Jain	Neogene		India	A bivalve belonging to the family Semelidae.	
Siptionella	Gen. et comb. et sp. nov	Valid	Berezovsky	Late Cretaceous (Maastrichtian) to early Oligocene		Belgium; Denmark; Germany; Ukraine	A bivalve belonging to the family Parallelodontidae. The type species is "Porterius" promtus Berezovsky (2002); genus also includes S. decussata (Koenen, 1893) and S. lornae (Heinberg, 1979), as well as new species Siptionella demissa.	
Spisula brombachensis	Sp. nov	Valid	Schneider & Mandic	Miocene (late Burdigalian)		Germany	A bivalve, a species of Spisula.	
Spondylus chlamydiformis	Sp nov	Valid	Jain	Neogene		India	A species of Spondylus.	
Stenoplax paviai	Sp. nov	Valid	Dell'Angelo et al.	Miocene (Tortonian)		Italy	A chiton belonging to the family Ischnochitonidae, a species of Stenoplax.	
Talochlamys bhatiyaensis	Sp nov	Valid	Jain	Neogene		India	A scallop.	
Tehamatea rasmusseni	Sp. nov	Valid	Hryniewicz, Little & Nakrem	Earliest Cretaceous		Norway	A lucinid bivalve, a species of Tehamatea.	
Tellina inflexuosa	Sp nov	Valid	Jain	Neogene		India	A species of Tellina.	
Trachycardium (Trachycardium) yairipokensis	Sp. nov	Valid	Sijagurumayum, Singh & Kachhara	Eocene	Disang Formation	India	A cockle, a species of Trachycardium.	
Venericardia (Venericardia) spondyliformis	Sp. nov	Valid	Sijagurumayum, Singh & Kachhara	Eocene	Disang Formation	India	A carditid bivalve, a species of Venericardia.	
Yabepecten okiensis	Sp. nov	Valid	Matsubara in Matsubara et al.	Miocene	Ichibu Formation	Japan	A scallop, a species of Yabepecten.	
