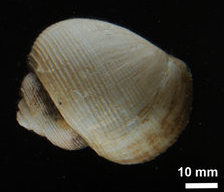
- Shell of Rubyspira from São Paulo Ridge

Scientific classification
- Kingdom: Animalia
- Phylum: Mollusca
- Class: Gastropoda
- Subclass: Caenogastropoda
- Order: incertae sedis
- Superfamily: Abyssochrysoidea
- Family: Rubyspiridae; Kaim, 2022
- Genus: Rubyspira; Johnson, Warén, Lee, Kano, Kaim, Davis, Strong & Vrijenhoek, 2010

Diversity
- 2 species

= Rubyspira =

Genus of gastropods

Rubyspira is a genus of deep water sea snails, marine gastropod molluscs, the only genus in family Rubyspiridae within the superfamily Abyssochrysoidea.

== Distribution ==
They are known from Monterey Bay, California.

== Species ==
Species within the genus Rubyspira include:

- Rubyspira goffrediae Johnson, Warén, Lee, Kano, Kaim, Davis, Strong & Vrijenhoek, 2010
- Rubyspira osteovora Johnson, Warén, Lee, Kano, Kaim, Davis, Strong & Vrijenhoek, 2010 - type species of the genus Rubyspira
- Rubyspira from São Paulo Ridge (undescribed species)

== Ecology ==
They are specialized bone-eating snails on whale falls. They were found on carcass of gray whale. Their main food source are bones of whales.
