= Liautaudia =

Liautaudia Temporal range: Hauterivian

Scientific classification
- Kingdom: Animalia
- Phylum: Mollusca
- Class: Cephalopoda
- Subclass: †Ammonoidea
- Order: †Ammonitida
- Suborder: †Ancyloceratina
- Family: †Hamulinidae
- Subfamily: †Megacrioceratinae
- Genus: †Liautaudia; Vermeulen & al., 2012
- Species: †L. fumisuginiformis

Binomial name
- †Liautaudia fumisuginiformis Vermeulen & al., 2012

Genus of ammonites

Liautaudia is monospecific genus of ammonite from the Upper Hauterivian. Its fossils have been found in Switzerland and France.
