= Bastelia =

Bastelia Temporal range: Hauterivian

Scientific classification
- Kingdom: Animalia
- Phylum: Mollusca
- Class: Cephalopoda
- Subclass: †Ammonoidea
- Order: †Ammonitida
- Suborder: †Ancyloceratina
- Family: †Hamulinidae
- Subfamily: †Megacrioceratinae
- Genus: †Bastelia; Vermeulen & al., 2012

Type species
- Bastelia schloegli Vermeulen & al., 2012

Species
- B. schloegli Vermeulen & al., 2012; B. taloirensis Vermeulen & al., 2012

Genus of ammonites

Bastelia is genus of ammonite from the Upper Hauterivian, during Balearites mortilleti zone and possibly also Pseudothurmannia angulicostata zone. Its fossils have been found in Switzerland (B. schloegli) and France (B. taloirensis).
