= Cryptopecten phrygium =

Scientific classification
- Kingdom: Animalia
- Phylum: Mollusca
- Class: Bivalvia
- Order: Pectinida
- Family: Pectinidae
- Genus: Cryptopecten
- Species: C. phrygium

Binomial name
- Cryptopecten phrygium (Dall, 1886)

Species of bivalve

Cryptopecten phrygium, the spathate scallop, is a species of bivalve mollusc in the family Pectinidae. It can be found along the Atlantic coast of North America, ranging from Cape Cod to the West Indies.

some spathate scallops are gonochoric, some are protandric hermaphrodites. spathate scallops Life cycle is made up of Embryos develop into free-swimming trochophore larvae, succeeded by the bivalve veliger, resembling a miniature clam.
