= Amorina (ammonite) =

Amorina Temporal range: Hauterivian–Barremian

Scientific classification
- Kingdom: Animalia
- Phylum: Mollusca
- Class: Cephalopoda
- Subclass: †Ammonoidea
- Order: †Ammonitida
- Suborder: †Ancyloceratina
- Family: †Hamulinidae
- Genus: †Amorina; Vermeulen, 2005

Type species
- Hamulina cincta d'Orbigny, 1850

Species
- A. intermedia Vermeulen, 2012; A. fumisuginum Uhlig, 1883; A. pictetiformis Busnardo, 2003; A. cincta Orbigny, 1850; A. subcincta Uhlig, 1883; A. hoheneggeri Uhlig, 1883; A. uhligi Karakasch, 1907; A. mariae Vermeulen & Vasicek, 2011; A. bidari Vermeulen & Vasicek, 2011; A. pindulensis Vermeulen, Skupien & Sulgan, 2004; A. victoruhligi Vermeulen & Vasicek, 2011

Amorina is genus of ammonite from the Upper Hauterivian, zone of Pseudothurmannia angulicostata to lower Lower Barremian zone of Coronites darsi. It has probably evolved from Megacrioceratinae and gave rise to genus Mascarellina.
