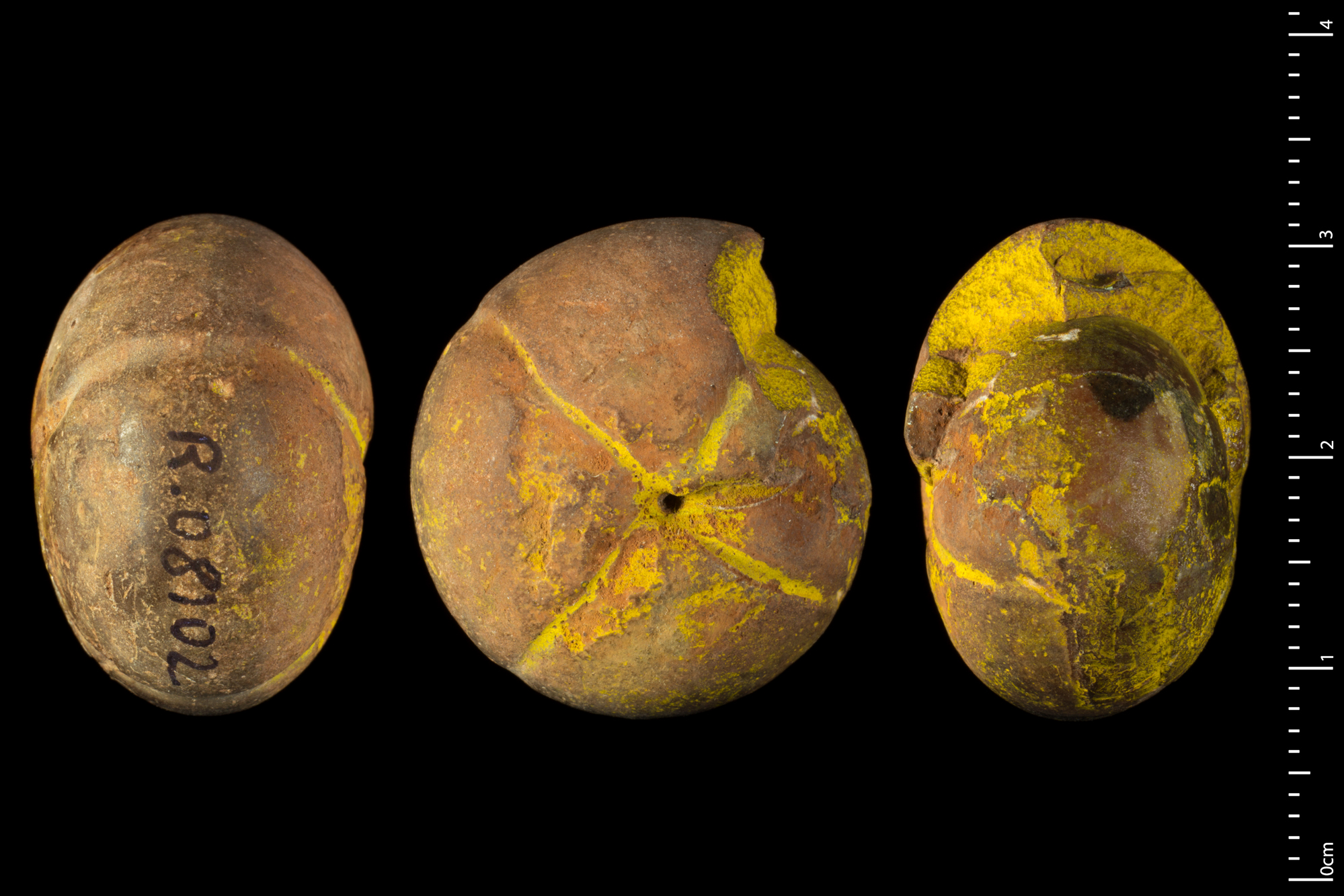
- Prionoceras divisum

Scientific classification
- Kingdom: Animalia
- Phylum: Mollusca
- Class: Cephalopoda
- Subclass: †Ammonoidea
- Order: †Goniatitida
- Family: †Prionoceratidae
- Subfamily: †Prionoceratinae
- Genus: †Prionoceras; Hyatt, 1883

= Prionoceras =

Prionoceras Temporal range: Devonian

Extinct genus of ammonites

Prionoceras is an extinct genus of ammonites. It lived during the Devonian period. Prionoceras divisum is the type specimen from the Fichtel Mountains. Specimens have been found in Algeria, China, Germany, Kazakhstan, Morocco, and Poland.
