= Galeodinopsis =

Scientific classification
- Kingdom: Animalia
- Phylum: Mollusca
- Class: Gastropoda
- Subclass: Caenogastropoda
- Order: Littorinimorpha
- Family: Rissoidae
- Genus: Galeodinopsis; Sacco, 1895

Type species
- † Rissoa tiberiana Coppi, 1876

Synonyms
- Alvania (Galeodinopsis) Sacco, 1895 (original rank)

Genus of small marine gastropod molluscs

Galeodinopsis is a genus of small marine gastropod molluscs or micromolluscs in the family Rissoidae.

This genus has a fossil record in the Euro-Mediterranean area, but it now lives in the Eastern Atlantic. It lives in fully marine shelf environments.

The shell is mostly conical and is white to white-yellow in color.

Some species in this genus use planktotrophic larval development.

== Species ==
- † Galeodinopsis biangulata (Deshayes, 1861)
- Galeodinopsis fariai (Rolán & F. Fernandes, 1990)
- † Galeodinopsis germanica Garilli & Parrinello, 2014
- † Galeodinopsis semperi (Wiechmann, 1871)
