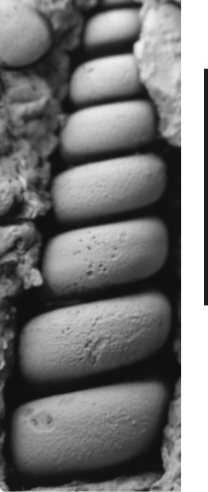
- Abapertural view of holotype Potamides archiaci. Scale bar is 10 mm.

Scientific classification
- Kingdom: Animalia
- Phylum: Mollusca
- Class: Gastropoda
- Subclass: Caenogastropoda
- Order: incertae sedis
- Family: Potamididae
- Genus: †Potamides
- Species: †P. archiaci

Binomial name
- †Potamides archiaci Halder & Sinha, 2014

= Potamides archiaci =

Potamides archiaci Temporal range: Middle Eocene

Extinct species of gastropod

Potamides archiaci is an extinct species of sea snail, a marine gastropod mollusc in the family Potamididae.

The specific name archiaci is in honour of French paleontologist Adolphe d'Archiac, who was one of the pioneering researchers to describe molluscs from the Indian subcontinent. Type specimen are deposited in the Department of Geology, Presidency University, Kolkata.

== Distribution ==
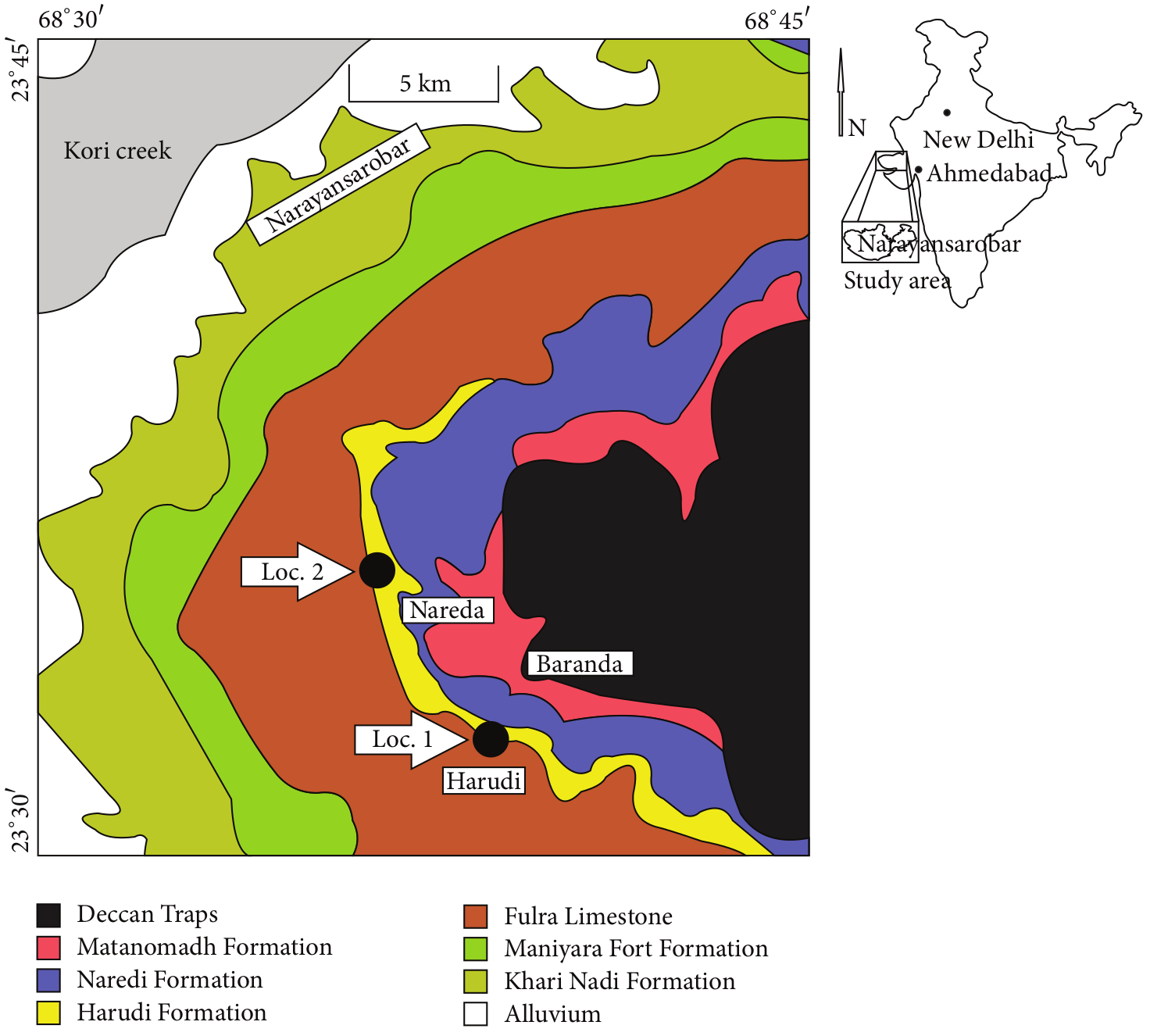
Locality 1, where Potamides archiaci was collected. Location of Harudi Formation (in yellow color), surrounded by Fulra Limestone (brown) and Naredi Formation (blue).

This species occurred in the lower Middle Eocene of Kutch District, Gujarat, western India. The type locality is about 2 km north of village Harudi 23°32′00″N 68°40′52″E, Harudi Formation, lower Middle Eocene.

== Description ==
Potamides archiaci is placed to the genus Potamides according to its shape, coiling pattern, and typical ornamentation.

The shell is small, narrow, turreted and conical. The spire is high. The shell is widening slowly and the apical angle is small. The shell has about 15 depressed whorls, which are separated by prominently impressed sutures. The base of the shell is flat, and the aperture is elliptical. There are two prominent rows of spiral tubercles on the sculpture. The surface in the earliest whorls is marked only by a beaded angularity. Its posterior beads become stronger tubercles, and are more distantly spaced than the anterior beads.

The width of the holotype is 5.9 mm, and its reconstructed height is about 24 mm. The maximum measured width of the shell is 8.05 mm, and its maximum reconstructed height is 31.22 mm.

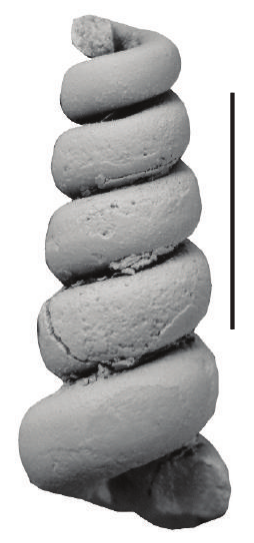
Photo of apertural view of paratype. It is the biggest shell of this species. Scale bar is 10 mm in all images.

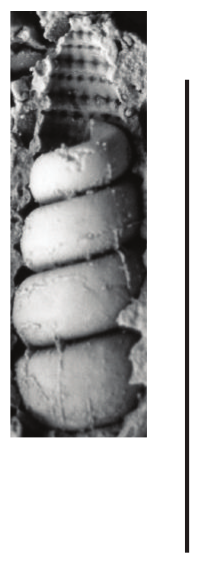
Abapertural view of paratype. Reconstructed shell width is 2.6 mm. Reconstructed shell height is 7.3 mm.

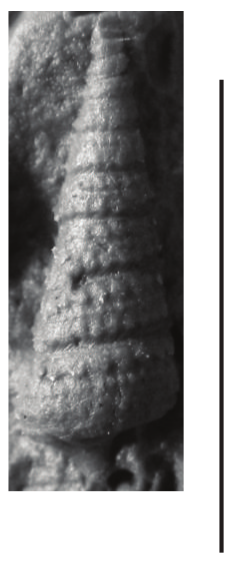
Abapertural view of paratype. Shell width is 3.77 mm. Shell height is 9.03 mm.

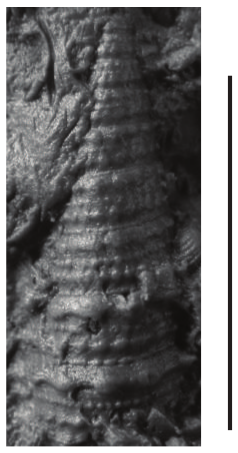
Abapertural view of paratype. Shell width is 6.48 mm. Shell height is 15.68 mm.

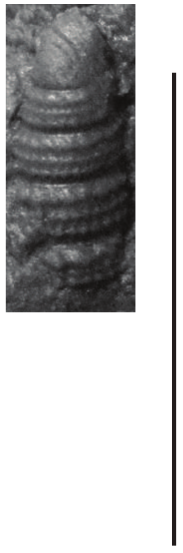
Abapertural view of paratype. Shell width is 3.35 mm. Reconstructed shell height is 7.57 mm.
