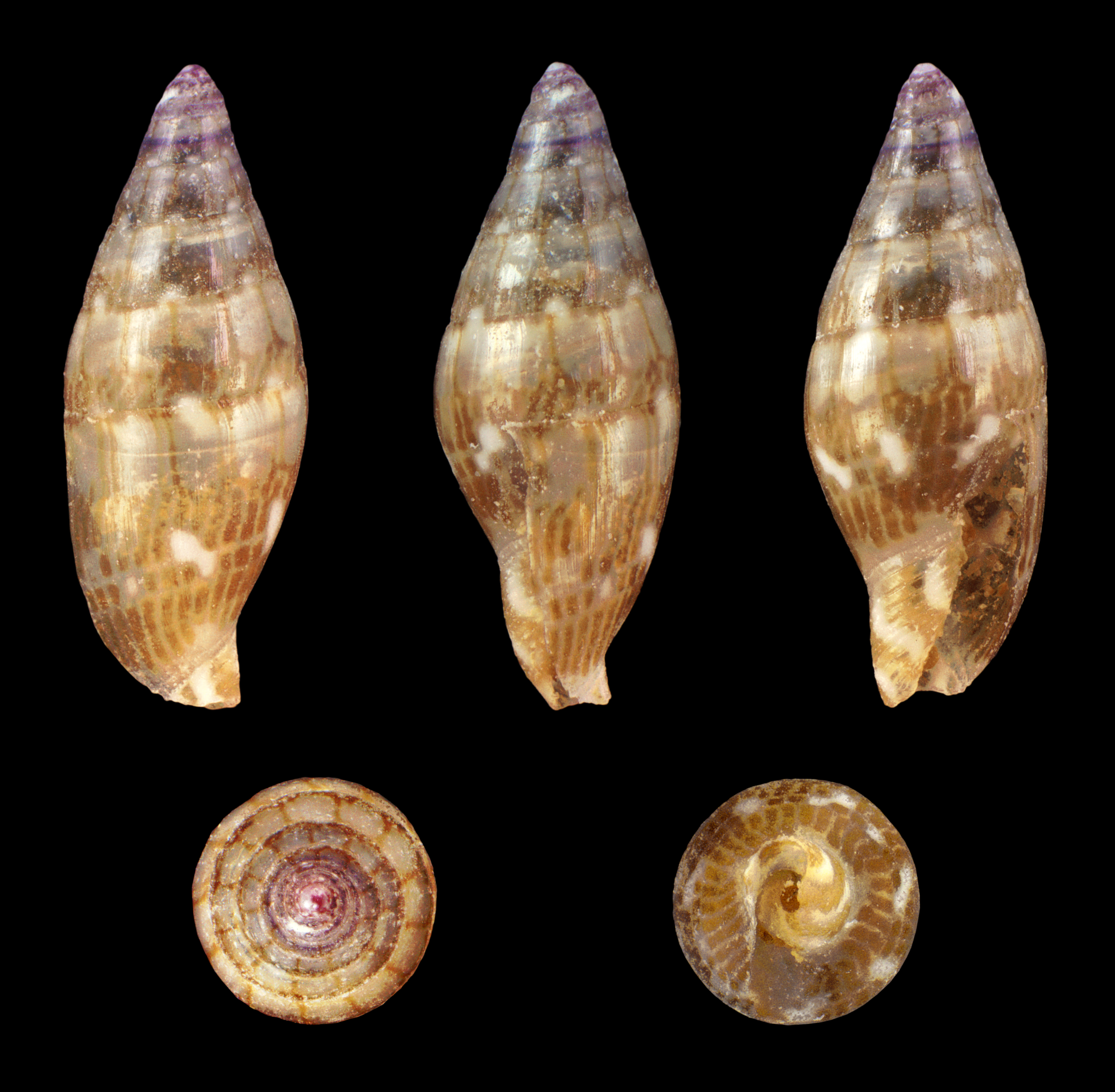
- Pyreneola melvilli Hedley, 1899

Scientific classification
- Kingdom: Animalia
- Phylum: Mollusca
- Class: Gastropoda
- Subclass: Caenogastropoda
- Order: Neogastropoda
- Superfamily: Buccinoidea
- Family: Columbellidae
- Genus: Pyreneola; Iredale, 1918

Type species
- Columbella abyssicola Brazier, 1877

Synonyms
- Pleurotomitrella Habe, 1958

= Pyreneola =

Genus of gastropods

Pyreneola is a genus of sea snails, marine gastropod mollusks in the family Columbellidae, the dove snails.

== Species ==
Species within the genus Pyreneola include:

- Pyreneola abyssicola (Brazier, 1877)
- Pyreneola arcuata (Turton, 1932)
- Pyreneola cincinnata (Martens, 1880)
- Pyreneola delineata (Thiele, 1925)
- Pyreneola fulgida (Reeve, 1859)
- Pyreneola leptalea (E.A. Smith, 1902)
- Pyreneola lozoueti Drivas & Jay, 1997
- Pyreneola lurida (Hedley, 1907)
- Pyreneola martae K. Monsecour & D. Monsecour, 2018
- Pyreneola mascarenensis Drivas & Jay, 1990
- Pyreneola melvilli (Hedley, 1835)
- Pyreneola pleurotomoides (Pilsbry, 1895)
- Pyreneola pupa (G.B. Sowerby III, 1894)
- Pyreneola semipicta (G.B. Sowerby III, 1894)
- Pyreneola shepstonensis (E.A. Smith, 1910)
- Pyreneola tuamotuensis K. Monsecour & D. Monsecour, 2018
