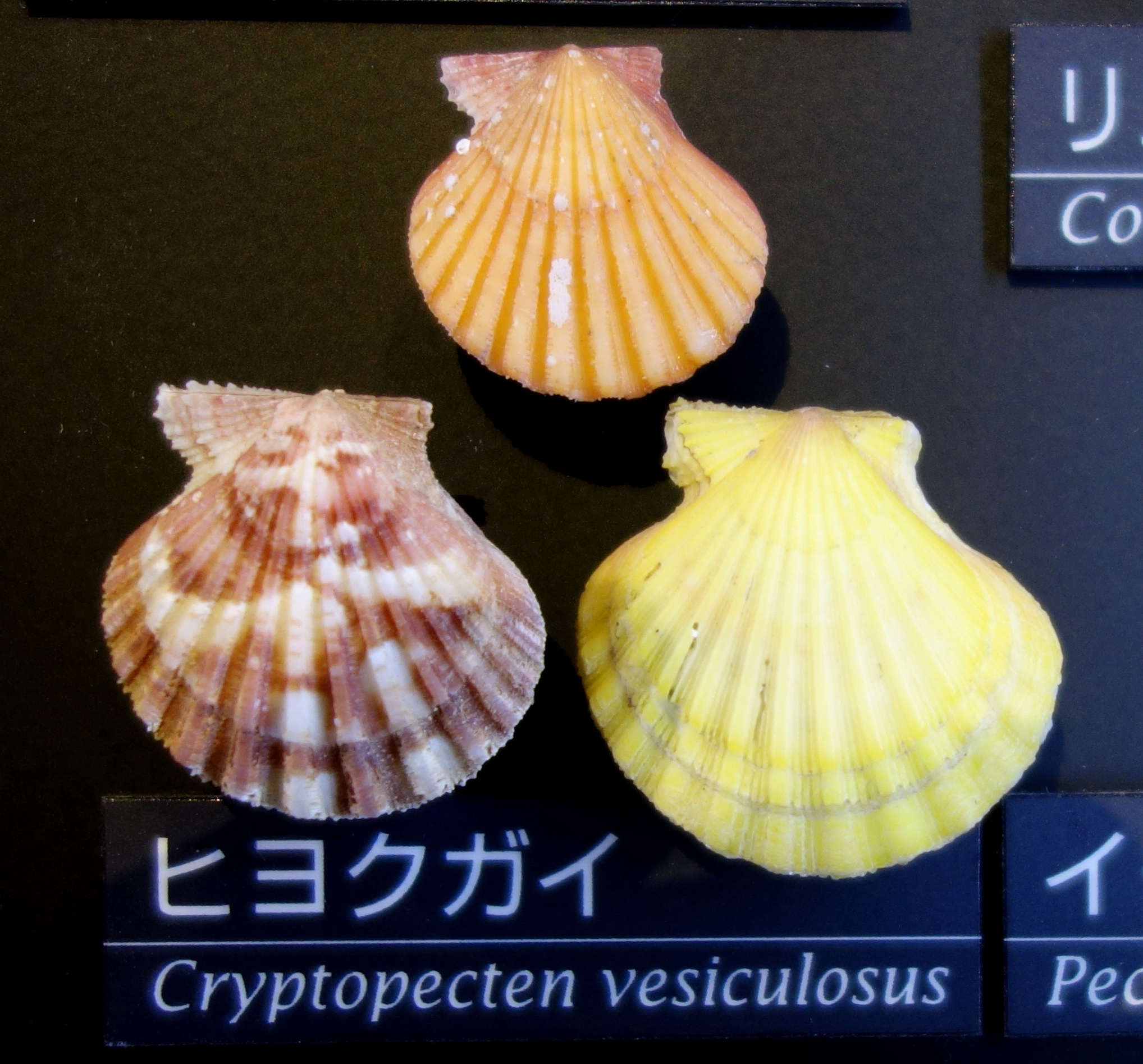
- Cryptopecten vesiculosus

Scientific classification
- Domain: Eukaryota
- Kingdom: Animalia
- Phylum: Mollusca
- Class: Bivalvia
- Order: Pectinida
- Family: Pectinidae
- Genus: Cryptopecten; Hayami, 1984

= Cryptopecten =

Genus of bivalves

Cryptopecten is a genus of molluscs in the family Pectinidae.

== Selected species ==
- Cryptopecten phrygium (Dall, 1886) — spathate scallop
