= Agassiceras =

Agassiceras Temporal range: Sinemurian

Scientific classification
- Domain: Eukaryota
- Kingdom: Animalia
- Phylum: Mollusca
- Class: Cephalopoda
- Subclass: †Ammonoidea
- Order: †Ammonitida
- Family: †Arietitidae
- Subfamily: †Agassiceratinae
- Genus: †Agassiceras; Hyatt, 1875

Lower Jurassic ammonite

Agassiceras is a Lower Jurassic ammonite from the Sinemurian stage in Europe. Agassiceras belongs to the psiloceratacean family, Arietitidae, and is characterized by being compressed with a sharp venter and feeble straight ribs that may bifurcate near the umbilical edge.
