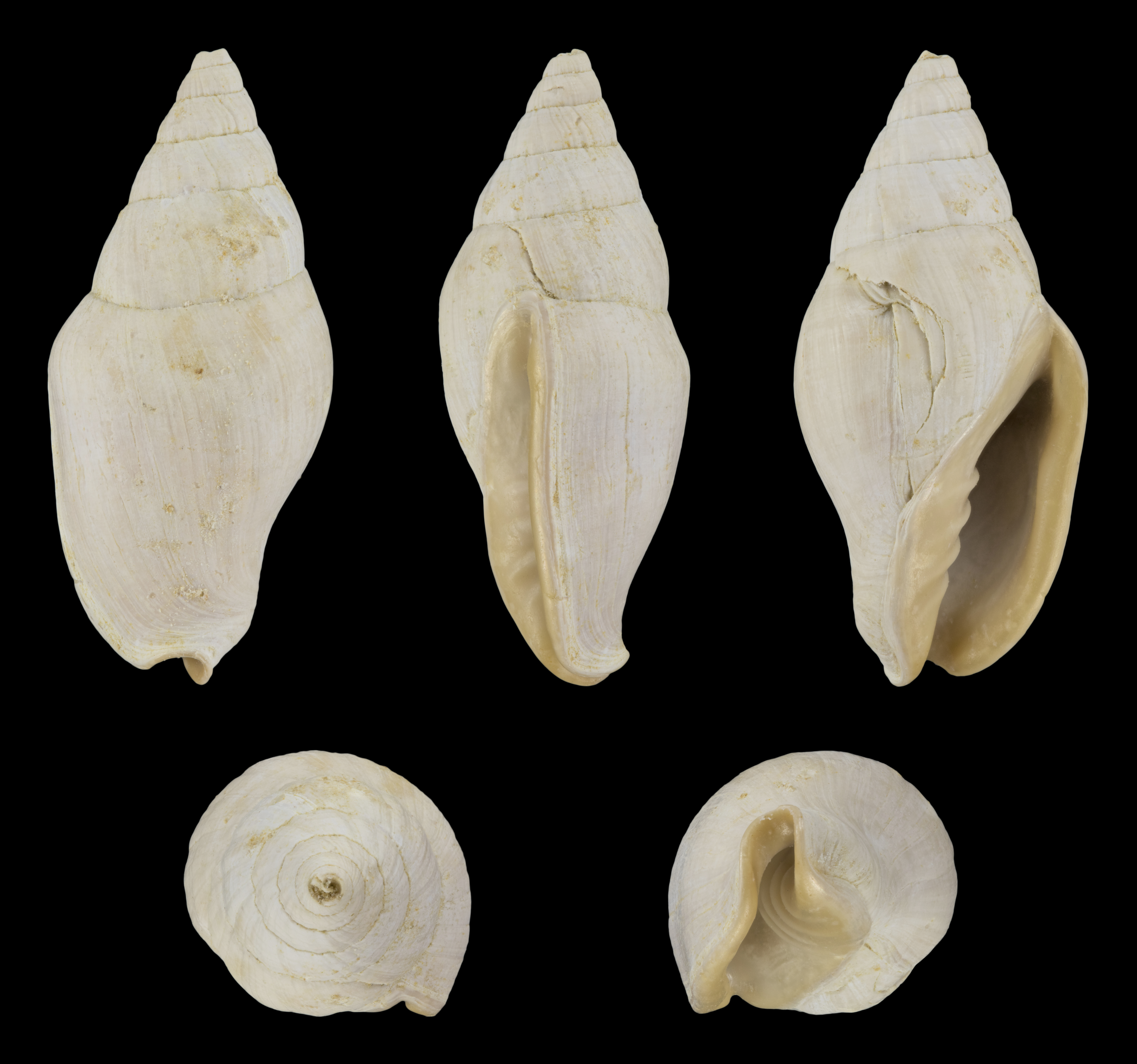
- Mitreola labratula Lamarck 1803

Scientific classification
- Kingdom: Animalia
- Phylum: Mollusca
- Class: Gastropoda
- Subclass: Caenogastropoda
- Order: Neogastropoda
- Family: Volutidae
- Subfamily: †Eovolutinae
- Genus: †Mitreola; Swainson, 1833

Synonyms
- Eneata; † Mitra (Mitreola) Swainson, 1833; Mitreala (misspelling)

= Mitreola (gastropod) =

Genus of gastropods

Mitreola is a genus of fossil sea snails, marine gastropod molluscs in the family Volutidae, the volutes.

== Species ==
Species within the genus Mitreola include:

- † Mitreola brohii Merle & Pacaud & Marivaux, 2014
- † Mitreola labratula Lamarck, 1803 (1 record from the Eocene in the United Kingdom)
- † Mitreola monodonta (Lamarck 1803) (synonym : Mitra monodonta)
- † Mitreola salaputium T. A. Darragh 1989

Species brought into synonymy

- † Mitreola branderi (Defrance, 1824): synonym of † Eovoluta branderi (Defrance, 1824)
- † Mitreola chaussyensis (Cossmann, 1907): synonym of † Eovoluta branderi (Defrance, 1824)
- † Mitreola parisiensis (Deshayes, 1832): synonym of † Eovoluta branderi (Defrance, 1824)

== Description ==
These species were epifaunal carnivores.
