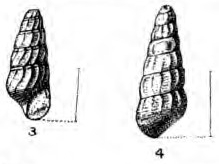
- Two shells of Hokkaidoconcha occidentalis from the original 1895 description.

Scientific classification
- Kingdom: Animalia
- Phylum: Mollusca
- Class: Gastropoda
- Subclass: Caenogastropoda
- Order: incertae sedis
- Superfamily: Abyssochrysoidea
- Family: †Hokkaidoconchidae; Kaim, Jenkins & Warén, 2008

= Hokkaidoconchidae =

Extinct family of gastropods

Hokkaidoconchidae is an extinct family of deep-water sea snails, marine gastropod mollusks.

== Shell description ==
The shell is small and elongate.

== Genera ==
- Hokkaidoconcha Kaim, Jenkins & Warén, 2008 - type genus
  - Hokkaidoconcha tanabei Kaim, Jenkins & Warén, 2008 - the type species from the upper Cretaceous in Japan
  - Hokkaidoconcha bilirata Kiel, Campbell, Elder & Little, 2008 - from the lower Cretaceous in Wilbur Springs, California, USA
  - Hokkaidoconcha morenoensis Kiel, Campbell, Elder & Little, 2008 - from the upper Cretaceous in Moreno Gulch, California, USA
  - Hokkaidoconcha occidentalis (Stanton, 1895) - synonym Hypsipleura? occidentalis Stanton, 1895 - from the upper Jurassic to the lower Cretaceous in California: Paskenta, California, Berryessa, San Jose, California, Wilbur Springs, California
  - Hokkaidoconcha tehamaensis Kiel, Campbell, Elder & Little, 2008 - from the upper Jurassic in Paskenta, California, USA
