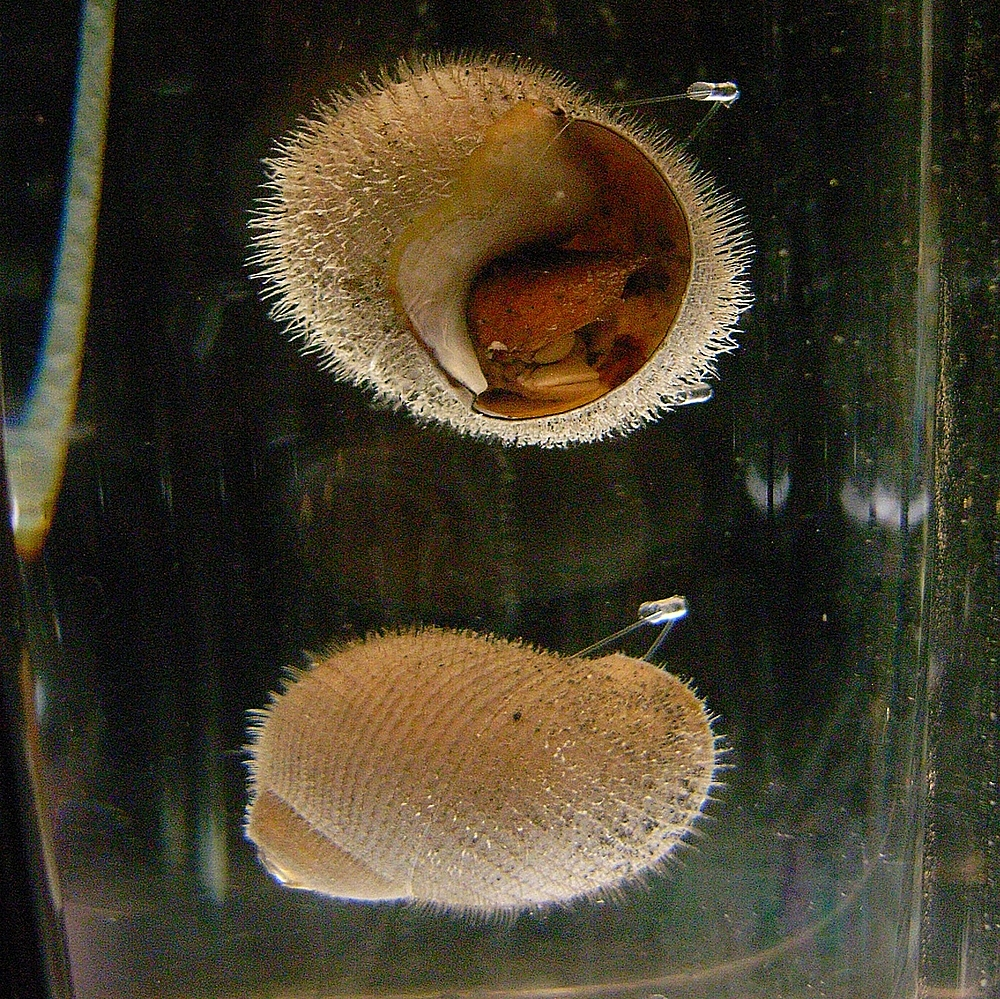
- Two preserved specimens of Alviniconcha hessleri, family Provannidae

Scientific classification
- Kingdom: Animalia
- Phylum: Mollusca
- Class: Gastropoda
- Subclass: Caenogastropoda
- Order: incertae sedis
- Superfamily: Abyssochrysoidea; Tomlin, 1927

= Abyssochrysoidea =

Superfamily of gastropods

Abyssochrysoidea is a superfamily of deep-water sea snails, marine gastropod mollusks unassigned to an order in the subclass Caenogastropoda.

These marine snails are part of the fauna of the hydrothermal vents and other deep-water habitats.

== Families ==
Families within the superfamily Abyssochryoidea include:

- Abyssochrysidae Tomlin, 1927
- † Hokkaidoconchidae Kaim, R. G. Jenkins & Warén, 2008
- Provannidae Warén & Ponder, 1991
- Rubyspiridae Kaim, 2022

These two families Provaniidae and Abyssochrysidae were previously placed in the "Zygopleuroid group" (according to the taxonomy of the Gastropoda by Bouchet & Rocroi, 2005).

Subsequently Provannidae was placed in the superfamily Abyssochrysoidea by Kaim et al. (2008) and then Abyssochrysidae was also moved to Abyssochrysoidea.
