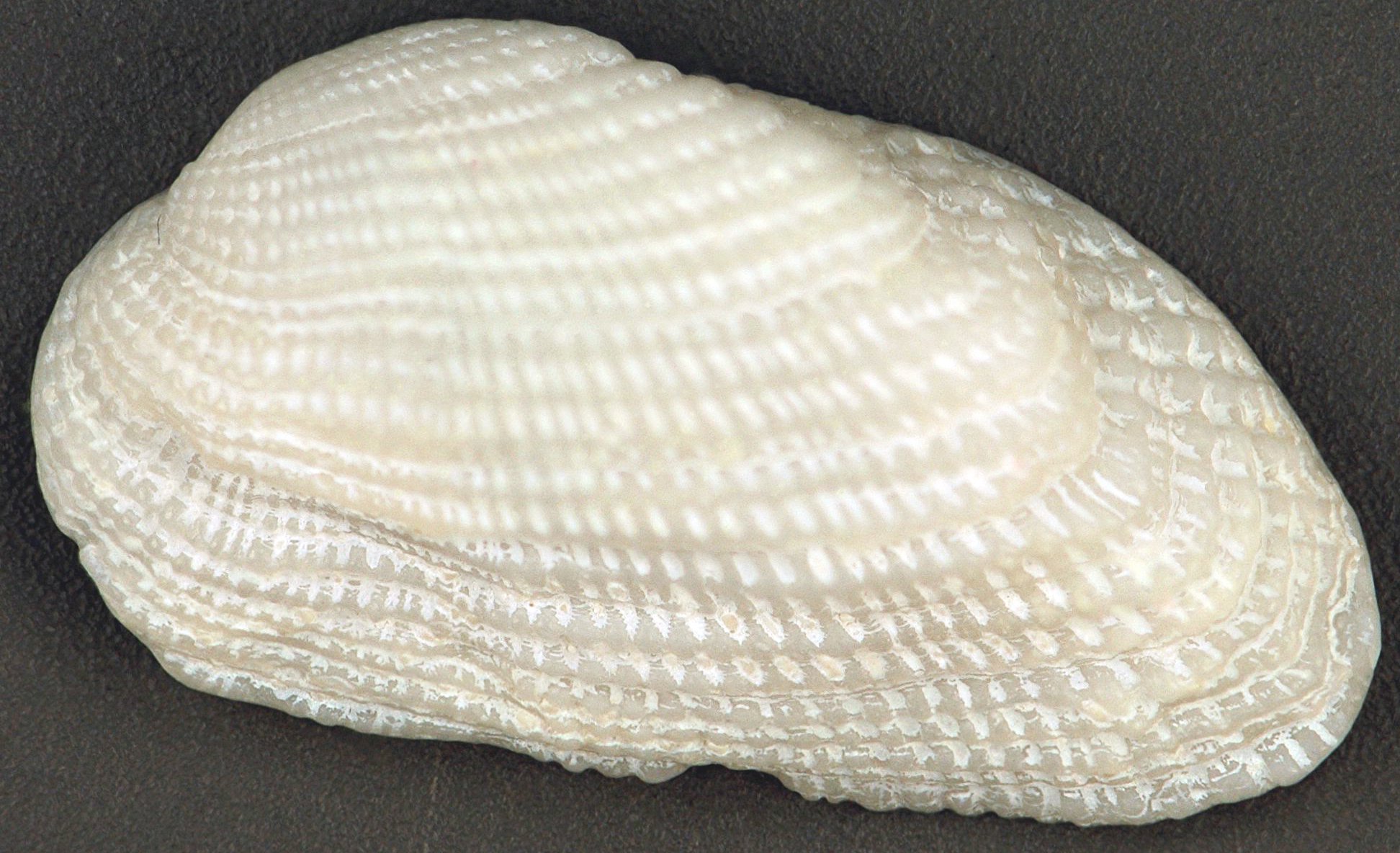
- View of a left valve of an Acar species

Scientific classification
- Domain: Eukaryota
- Kingdom: Animalia
- Phylum: Mollusca
- Class: Bivalvia
- Order: Arcida
- Family: Arcidae
- Genus: Acar; Gray, 1857

= Acar (bivalve) =

Genus of bivalves

Acar is a genus of small saltwater clams, marine bivalve mollusks in the family Arcidae, the ark clams.

Some authors consider it to be a subgenus of Barbatia.

== Species ==
Species in this genus include:

- Acar abdita P. G. Oliver & Chesney, 1994
- Acar agulhasensis (Thiele, 1931)
- Acar bailyi Bartsch, 1931
- Acar botanica (Hedley, 1917)
- Acar carditaeformis (Dautzenberg & H. Fischer, 1897)
- Acar clathrata (Defrance, 1816)
- Acar congenita (E. A. Smith, 1885)
- Acar decorata (Hayami & Kase, 1993)
- Acar dubia (Baird, 1873)
- Acar gradata (Broderip & G. B. Sowerby I, 1829), from California, US
- Acar lepidoformis Francisco, Barros & S. Lima, 2012
- Acar marsupialis P. G. Oliver & Holmes, 2004
- Acar naturezae Francisco, Barros & S. Lima, 2012
- Acar oliveirae Francisco, Barros & S. Lima, 2012
- Acar olivercoseli M. Huber, 2010
- Acar petasion (Kilburn, 1983)
- Acar plicata (Dillwyn, 1817)
- Acar pusilla (G. B. Sowerby I, 1833)
- Acar requiescens (Melvill & Standen, 1907)
- Acar rostae (Berry, 1954)
- Acar sandersonae Powell, 1933
- Acar sociella (Brookes, 1926)
- Acar squamosa (Lamarck, 1819)
- Acar transmar Simone, 2009, from Brazil

Although Simone lists another species Acar domingensis, it has been reclassified as Barbatia.
