= Garroniceras =

Garroniceras Temporal range: Hauterivian

Scientific classification
- Kingdom: Animalia
- Phylum: Mollusca
- Class: Cephalopoda
- Subclass: †Ammonoidea
- Order: †Ammonitida
- Suborder: †Ancyloceratina
- Family: †Hamulinidae
- Subfamily: †Megacrioceratinae
- Genus: †Garroniceras; Vermeulen & al., 2012

Type species
- Ancyloceras Seringei Astier, 1851

Species
- G. dommerguesi Vermeulen & al., 2014; G. morloti Ooster, 1860; G. picteti Ooster, 1860; G. thibaudi Vermeulen & al., 2014; G. schoendelmayeri Vermeulen & al., 2014; G. seringei Astier, 1851

Genus of ammonites

Garroniceras is genus of ammonite from the Upper Hauterivian, zones of Balearites balearis to Spathicrioceras seitzi.
