= Megacrioceratinae =

Megacrioceratinae Temporal range: Hauterivian–Barremian

Scientific classification
- Kingdom: Animalia
- Phylum: Mollusca
- Class: Cephalopoda
- Subclass: †Ammonoidea
- Order: †Ammonitida
- Suborder: †Ancyloceratina
- Family: †Hamulinidae
- Subfamily: †Megacrioceratinae; Vermeulen & al. 2010

Subfamily of ammonites

Megacrioceratinae is an extinct ammonoid cephalopod subfamily. It has been described as family Megacrioceratidae in 2006, but later changed into subfamily under its current name. Ammonites belonging to this subfamily lived from Plesiospitidiscus ligatus zone of Upper Hauterivian until Avramidiscus kiliani zone of Lower Barremian.

== Genera ==
- Garroniceras
- Megacrioceras
- Bastelia
- Liautaudia
