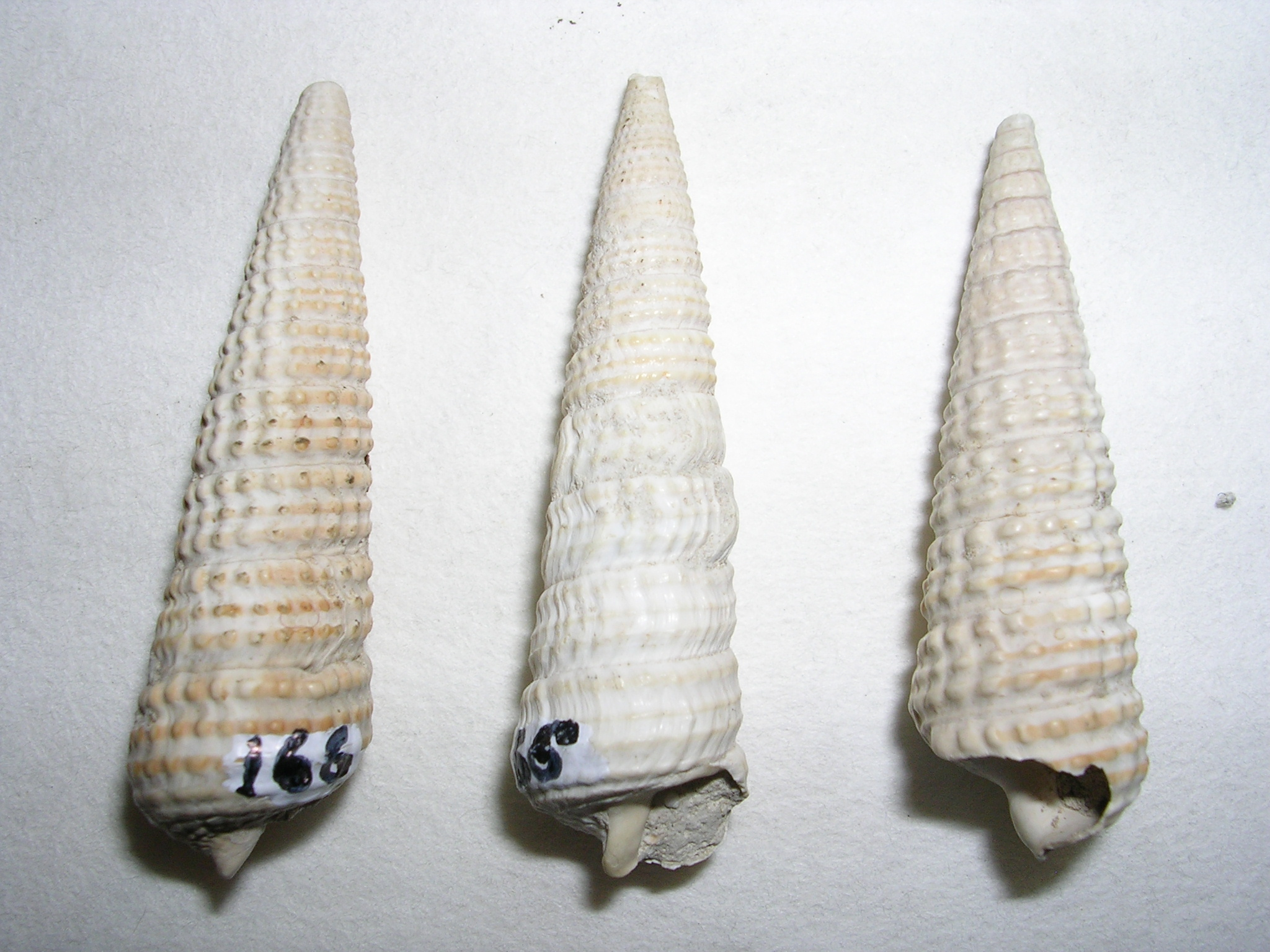
- Three fossil shells of Potamides migralis

Scientific classification
- Kingdom: Animalia
- Phylum: Mollusca
- Class: Gastropoda
- Subclass: Caenogastropoda
- Order: incertae sedis
- Family: Potamididae
- Genus: †Potamides; Brongniart, 1810

Synonyms
- Cerithium (Potamides); Cerithium (Potamis); Potamides (Potamides) Brongniart, 1810; † Potamides (Potamidopsis) Munier-Chalmas, 1900· accepted, alternate representation; † Potamides (Tylochilus) Cossmann, 1889· accepted, alternate representation

= Potamides (gastropod) =

Potamides Temporal range: Permian - Quaternary

Genus of gastropods

Potamides is a genus of prehistoric sea snails, marine gastropod mollusks in the family Potamididae.

== Species ==
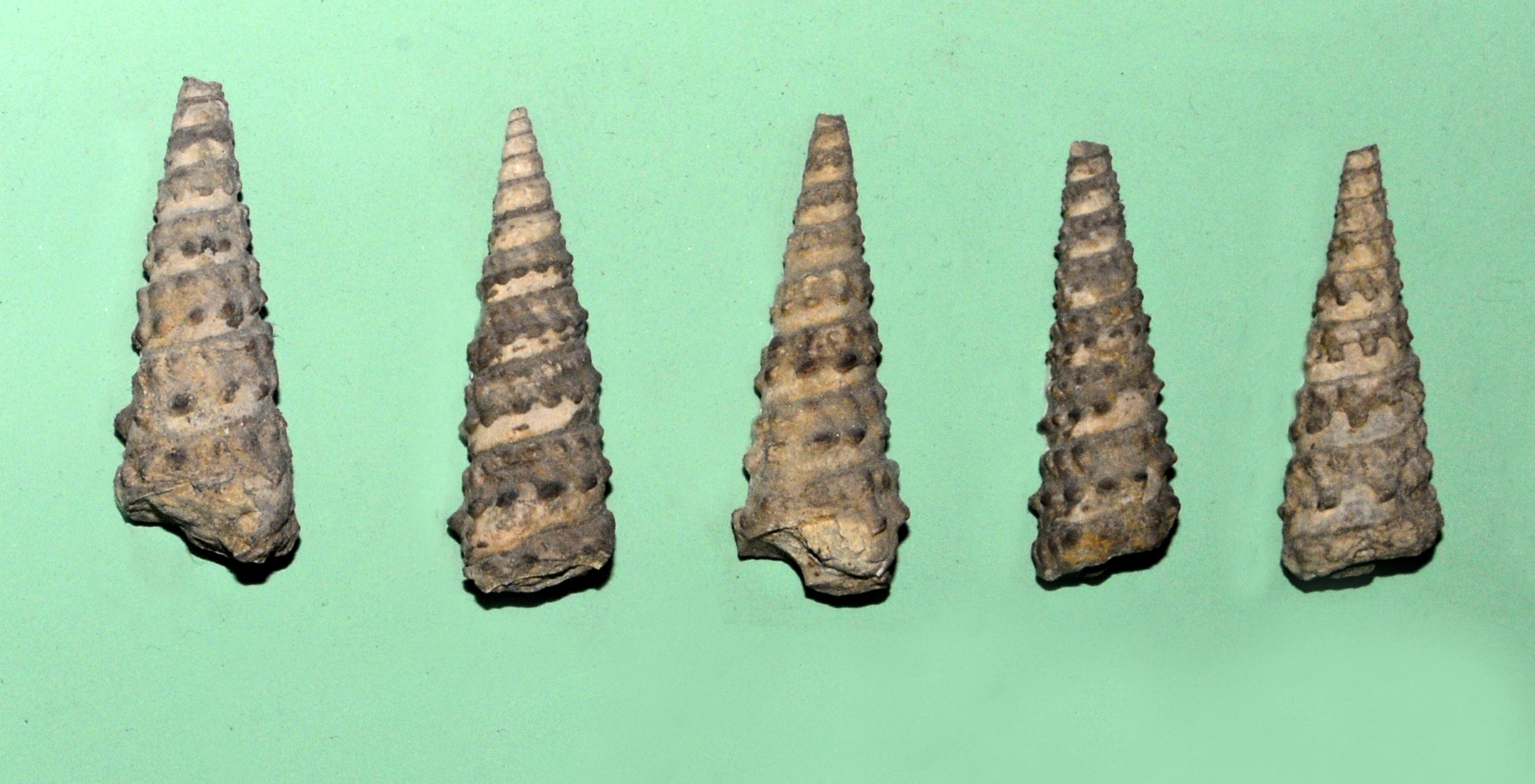
Fossil shells of Potamides tricarinatus from Eocene of Italy

Species within the genus Potamides include:

- † Potamides archiaci Halder & Sinha, 2014
- † Potamides crassituberosus Cossmann & Pissarro, 1902
- † Potamides durranus Iqbal, 1969
- † Potamides isabenense Dominici & Kowalke, 2014
- † Potamides lamarckii Brongniart, 1810
- † Potamides matsoni Dall, 1913
- † Potamides migralis
- † Potamides mosaliensis Banerjee & Halder, 2024
- † Potamides pascoei Cox, 1931
- † Potamides shahensis Banerjee & Halder, 2024
- † Potamides tricarinatus
- and other extinct taxa
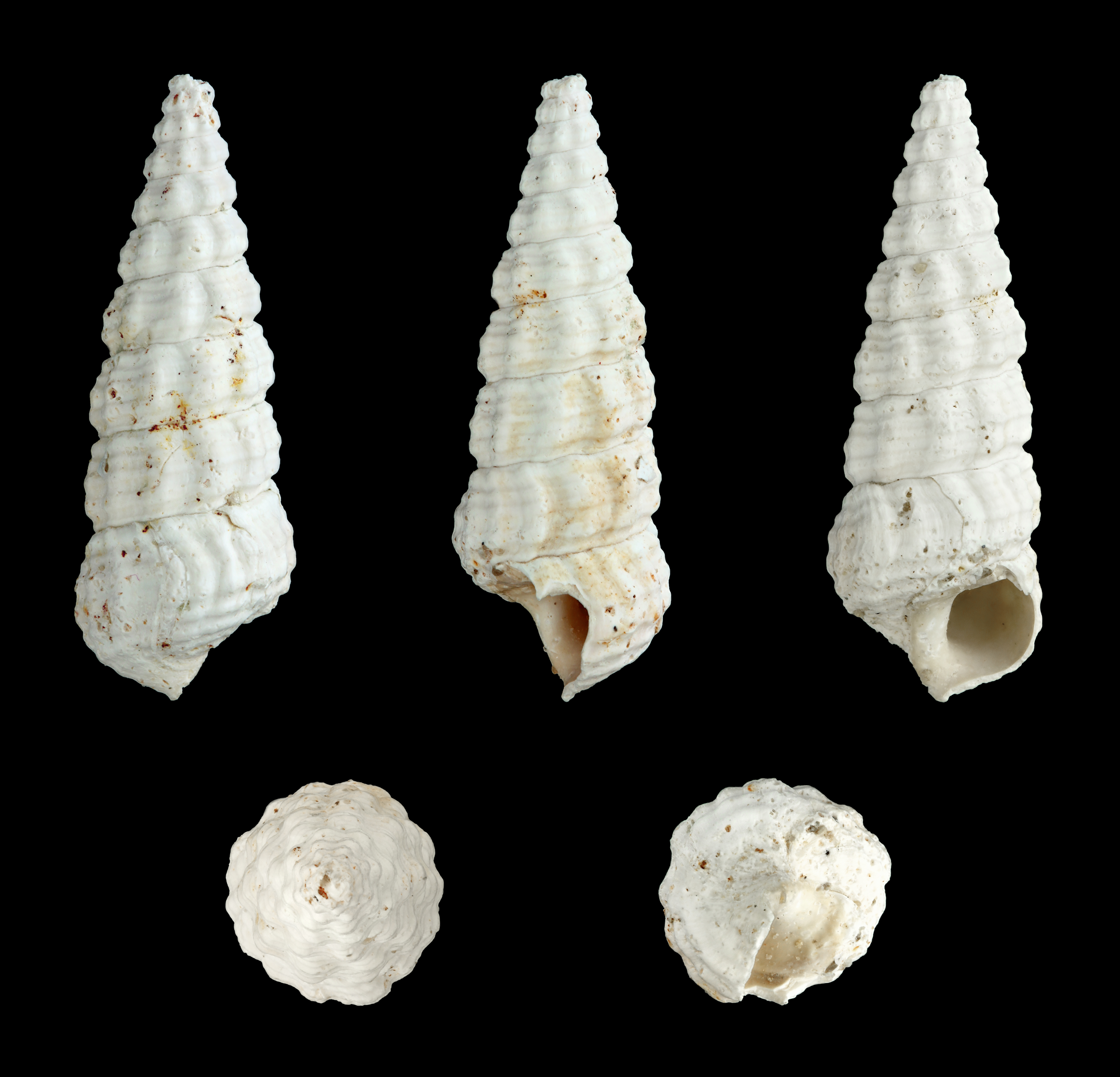
Potamides disjuncta

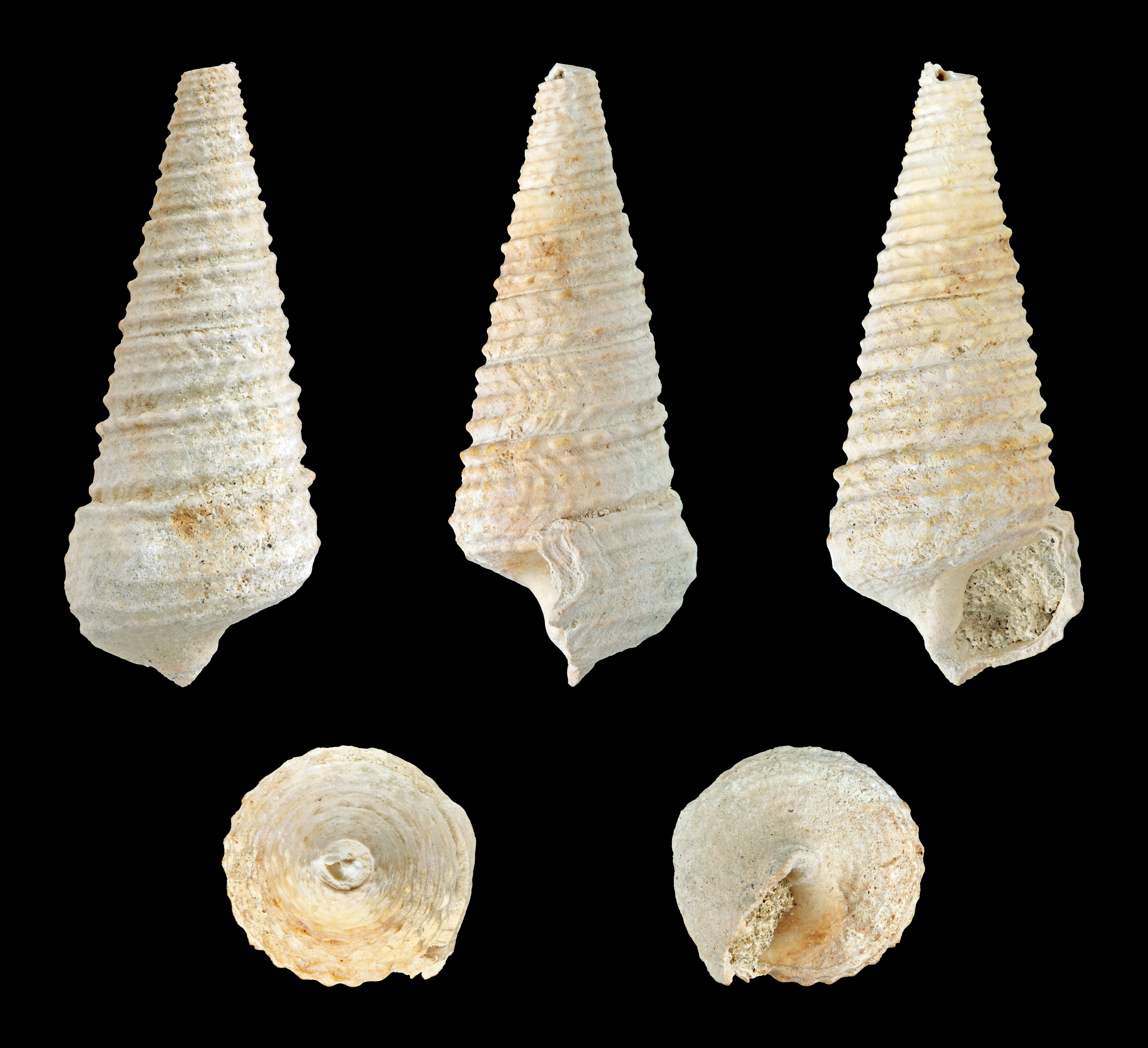
Potamides mixtus

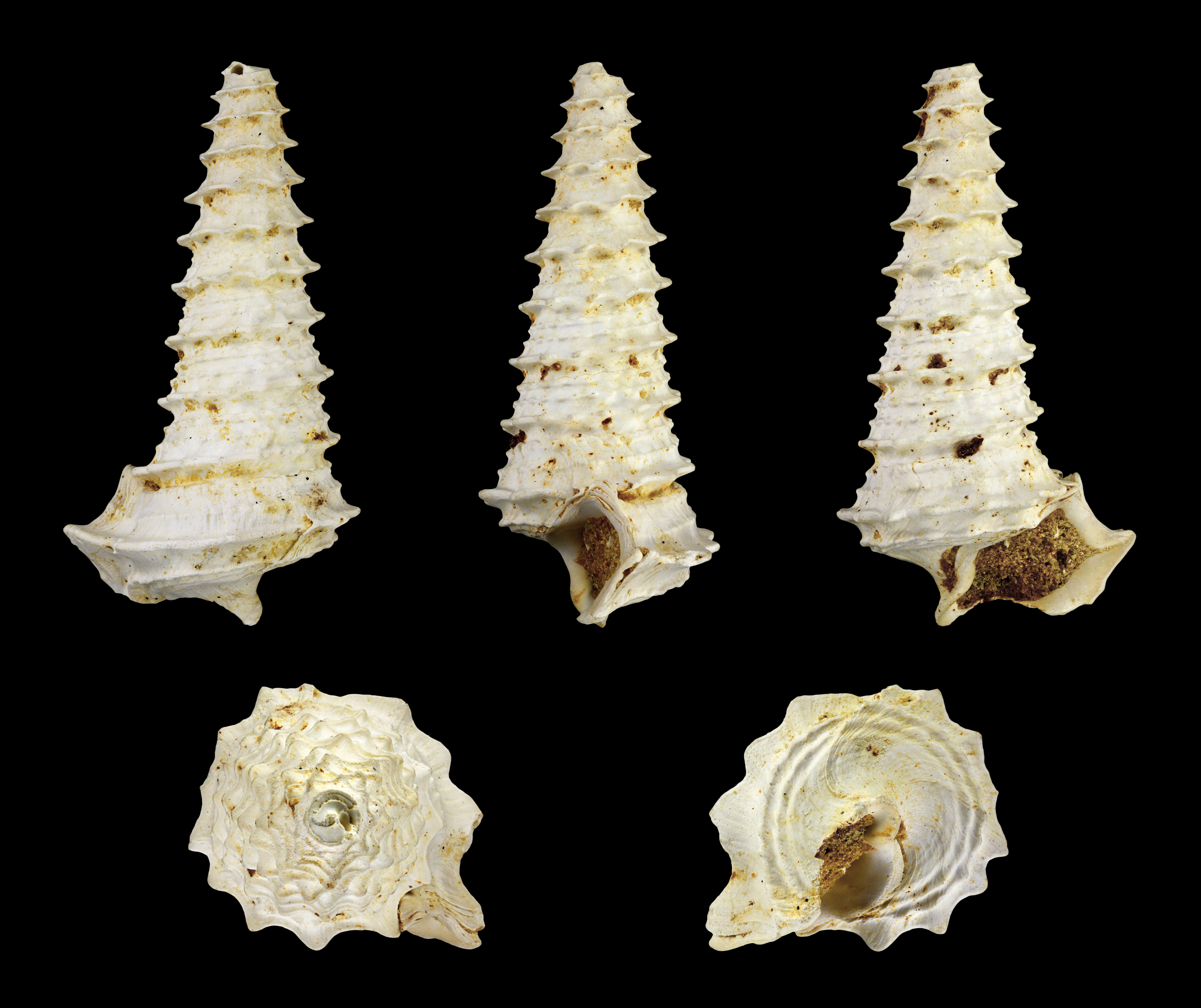
Potamides tricarinatus

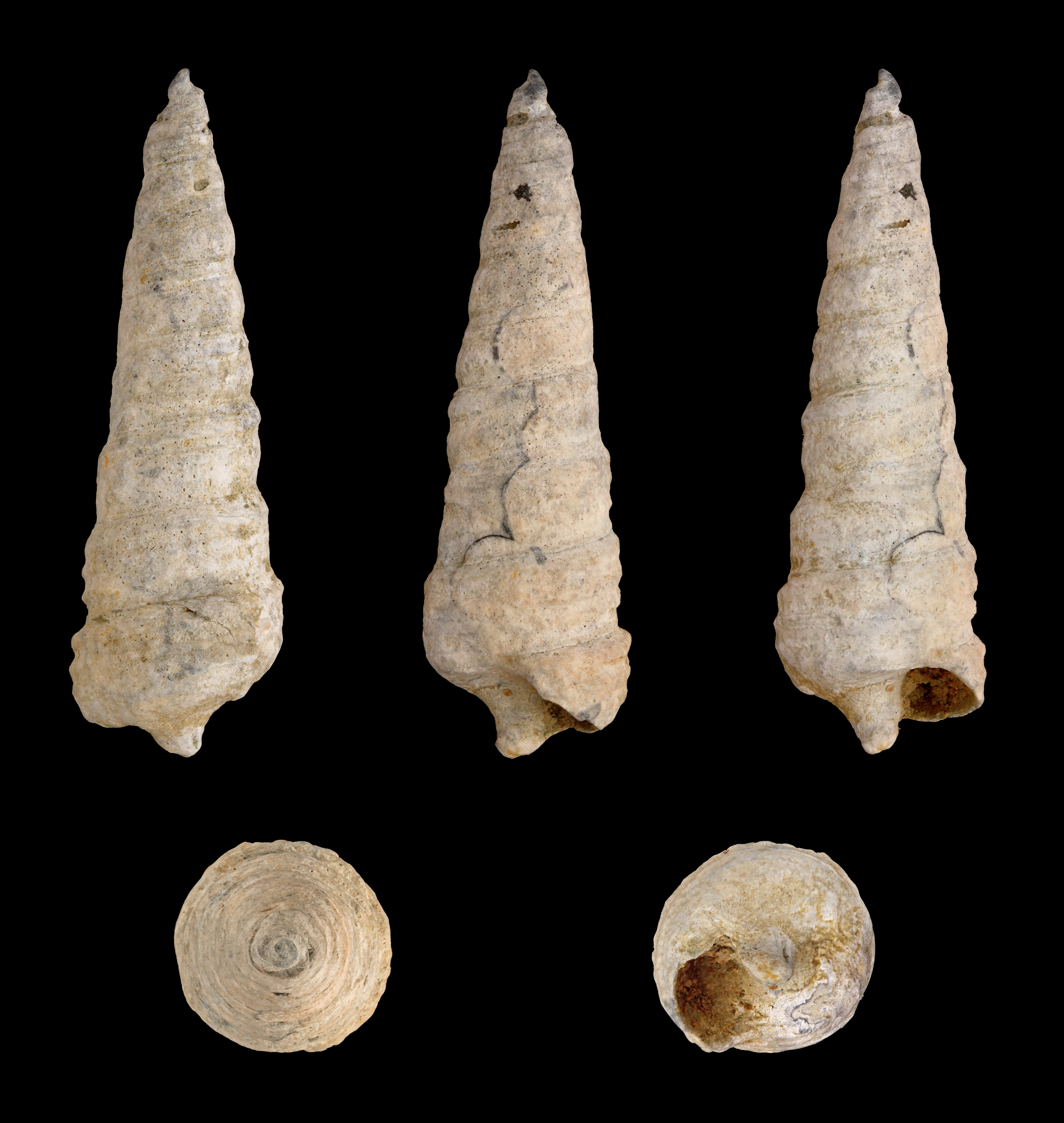
Potamides tricinctus

Synonyms:

- Potamides conicus (Blainville, 1829) is a synonym of extant species Pirenella conica (Blainville, 1829)

== Fossil record ==
Fossils of Potamides are found in marine strata from the Permian to the Quaternary(age range: from 265.0 to 1.806 million years ago.). Fossils are known from many localities in Europe, Indonesia, Africa, North America, South America, Pakistan, Japan and Cambodia.
