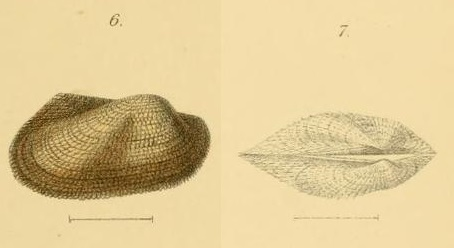
- Asperarca nodulosa

Scientific classification
- Kingdom: Animalia
- Phylum: Mollusca
- Class: Bivalvia
- Order: Arcida
- Family: Arcidae
- Genus: Asperarca; Sacco, 1898

Species
- See text

= Asperarca =

Genus of bivalves

Asperarca is a genus of bivalves in the family Arcidae which currently consists of eight species. They attach themselves to rocks or hard substrates with byssal threads in shallower, coastal waters. It was first described by Dr. Federico Sacco in December 1898 with the type taxon A. nodulosa that has been recorded throughout the coastal Mediterranean Sea, Baltic Sea, and northeastern Atlantic Ocean. The earliest known species are A. acuta and A. microida which were found in 2014 in Ukraine from the Eocene Epoch.

== Description ==
Shells in this genus are elongated and rectangular at about 6-32 millimeters in length. The hinged side of the shell is a straight line which curves into a rounded edge. One side of the hinge has 10-20 prominent teeth while the other has matching indentations. The prodissoconch starts out rounded and nearly circular before stretching into a parallelogram with a distinct diagonal point on the far end of the adult shell. Some have described it as more of a trapezoid shape. Shells tend to have a tan or beige periostracum and are convex with the highest point just in front of the hinge. Byssal threads extend from the hinge to attach shells to hard surfaces or substrates.

== Species ==
- Asperarca acuta Berezovsky, 2014
- Asperarca ectocomata (Dall, 1886)
- Asperarca magdalenae La Perna, 1998
- Asperarca microida Berezovsky, 2014
- Asperarca nodulosa (O. F. Müller, 1776)
- Asperarca sagrinata (Dall, 1886)
- Asperarca secreta La Perna, 1998
- Asperarca tarcylae Francisco, J. Barros, & S. Lima, 2012
