= List of the prehistoric life of Arkansas =

This list of the prehistoric life of Arkansas contains the various prehistoric life-forms whose fossilized remains have been reported from within the US state of Arkansas.

== Precambrian ==
The Paleobiology Database records no known occurrences of Precambrian fossils in Alabama.

== Paleozoic ==
=== Selected Paleozoic taxa of Arkansas ===
- †Adnatoceras
- †Amphiscapha
- †Amplexus
- †Ananaspis
- †Anthracoceras
- †Aphelaeceras
- †Arcanoceras
- †Archaeocidaris
- Archaeolithophyllum – tentative report
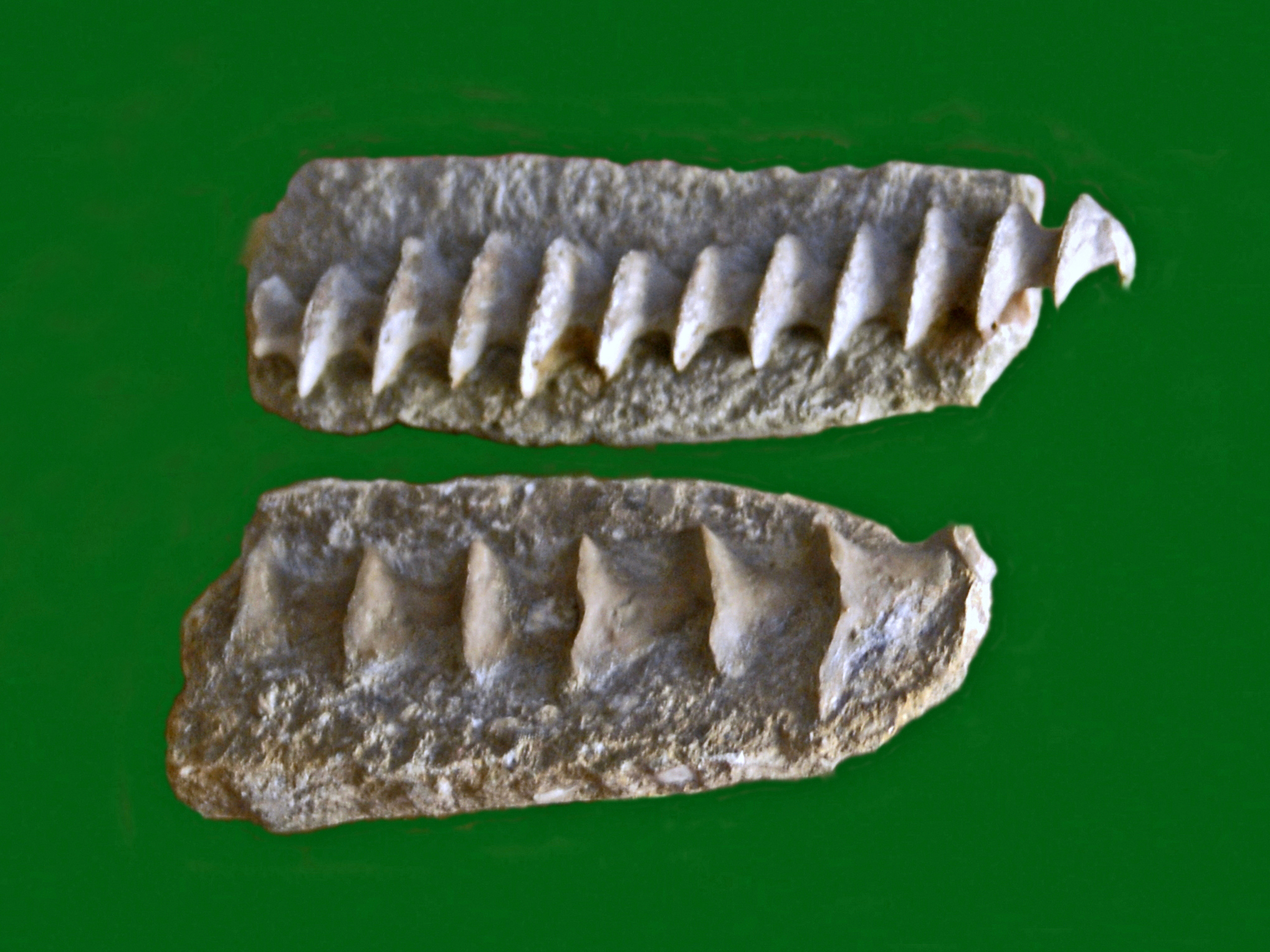
- Fossils of the Carboniferous-Permian bryozoan Archimedes
  †Archimedes
- †Archimylacris
- †Arkanites
- †Athyris
- †Atrypa
- †Aviculopecten
  - †Aviculopecten inspeciosus
  - †Aviculopecten jennyi
  - †Aviculopecten morrowensis
  - †Aviculopecten squamula
- † Avonia
- †Axinolobus
- †Bactritimimus
- †Baschkirites
- †Bellerophon
  - †Bellerophon welshi
- †Bisatoceras
- †Bistrialites
- †Branneroceras
- †Cancelloceras
- †Cavusgnathus
- †Cheirurus
- †Chonetes
- †Cleiothyridina
- †Composita
- †Cornuproetus
- †Cravenoceras
- †Cypricardinia – tentative report
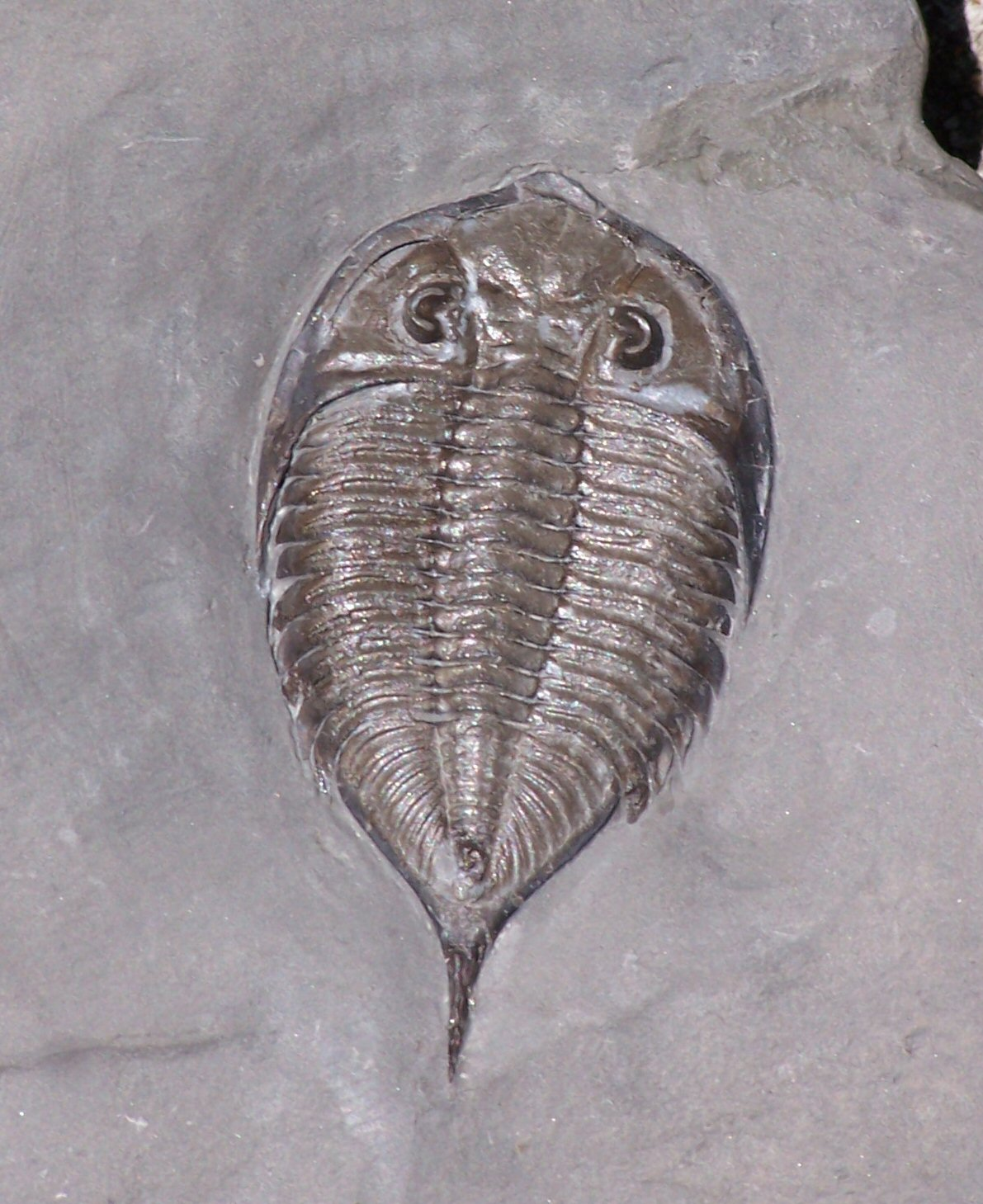
- Fossil of the Late Ordovician-Middle Devonian trilobite Dalmanites
  †Dalmanites – type locality for genus
- †Deiphon
- †Delops
- †Diacalymene
- †Dicoelosia
- †Dolorthoceras
- †Echinaria
- †Edmondia
- †Encrinurus
- †Endolobus
- †Eophacops
- †Eospirifer
- †Eowellerites
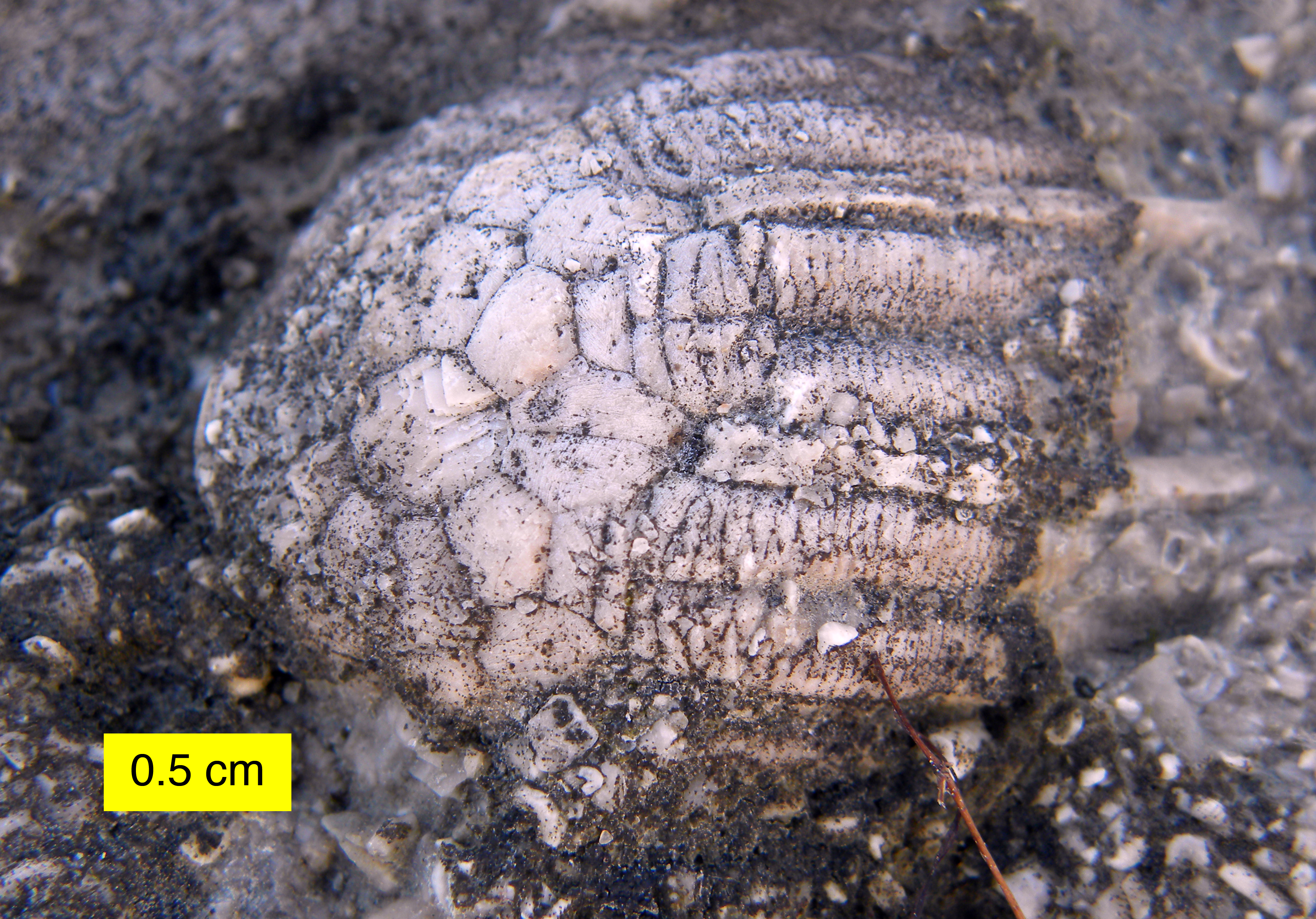
- Fossilized calyx of the Silurian-Middle Devonian crinoid ("sea lily") Eucalyptocrinites
  †Eucalyptocrinites
- †Euomphalus
- †Gastrioceras
- Gastrochaenolites
- †Girvanella
- †Glyptambon – type locality for genus
- †Glyptopleura
- †Gnathodus
- †Goniatites
  - †Goniatites crenistria – or unidentified related form
- †Hematites
- †Irvingella
- †Kazakhstania – tentative report
- †Lingula
- †Liroceras – tentative report
- †Mariceras
- †Meristina
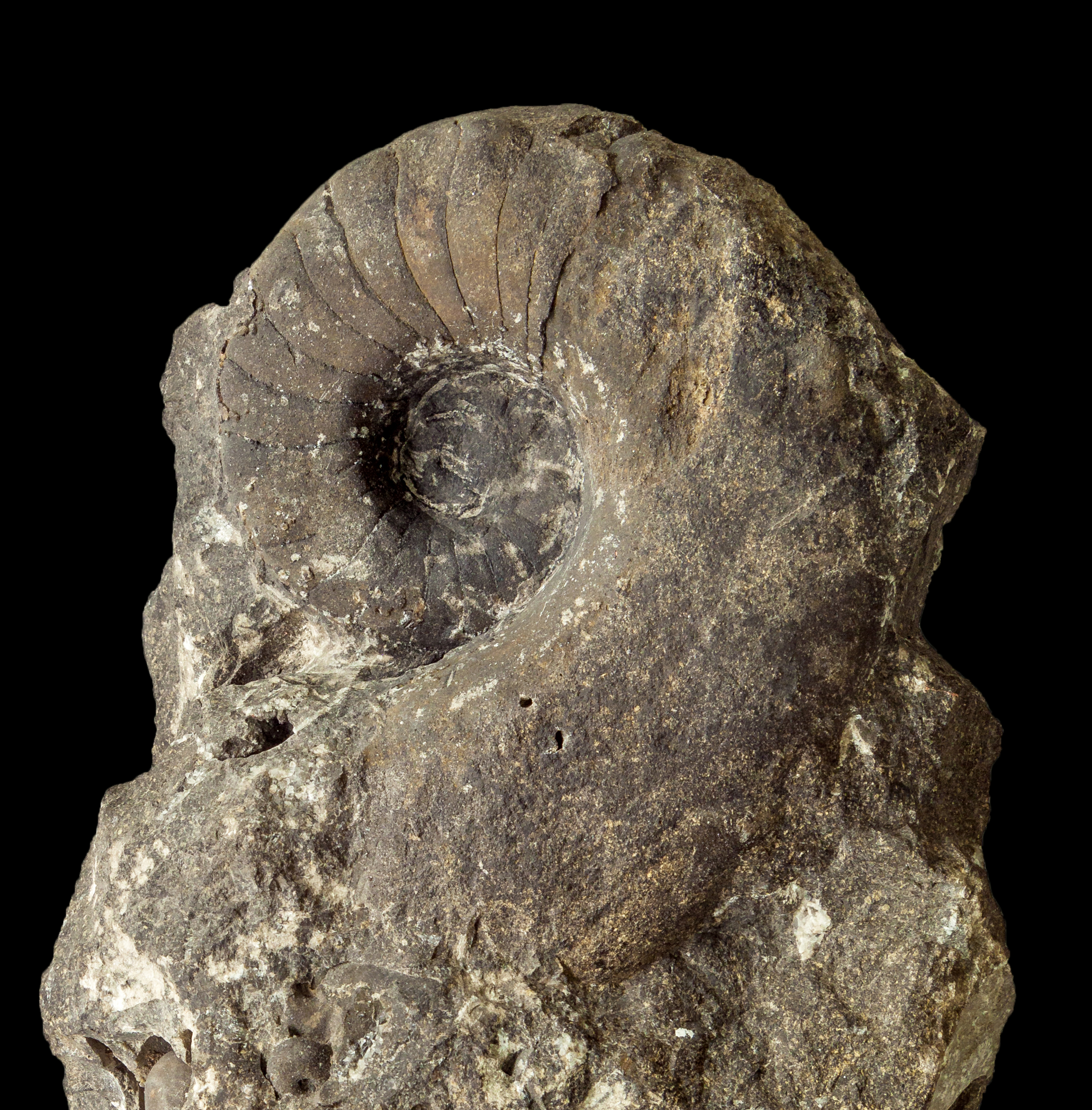
- Fossilized shell of the Carboniferous-Permian nautiloid cephalopod Metacoceras
  †Metacoceras
- †Michelinoceras
- †Naticopsis
- †Ozarcus – type locality for genus
  - †Ozarcus mapesae – type locality for species
- †Pachylyroceras
- †Paladin
- †Paleoconus
- †Paralegoceras
- †Pentremites
- †Peripetoceras
- †Platyceras
- †Plectodonta – tentative report
- †Plicochonetes
- †Posidonia
- †Proetus
- †Quinnites
- †Rayonnoceras
- †Sandia
- †Solenochilus
- †Solenomorpha
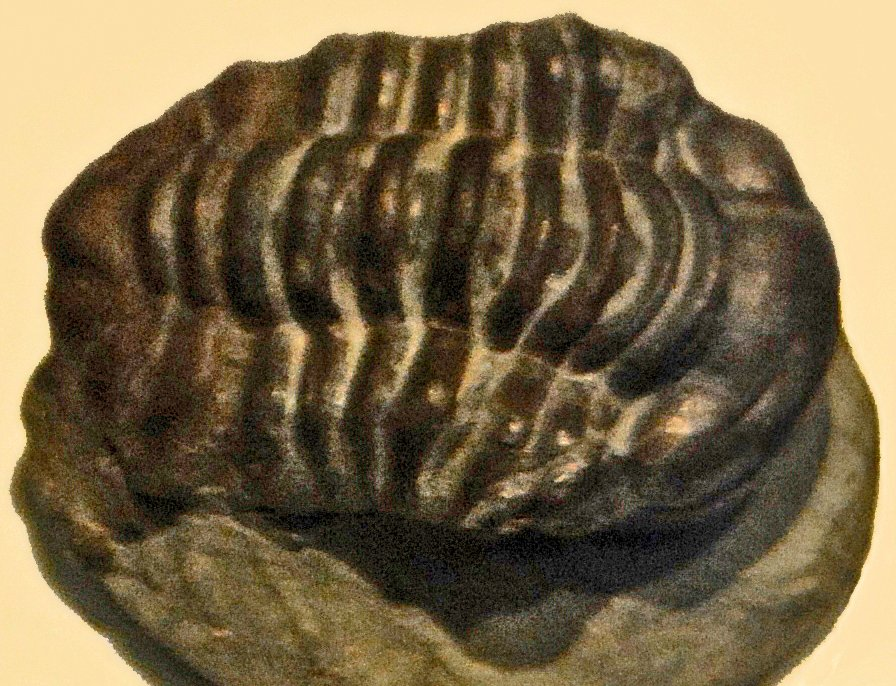
- Fossil of the Middle Ordovician-Silurian trilobite Sphaerexochus
  †Sphaerexochus
- †Spirifer
- †Stearoceras
- †Stigmaria
- †Stroboceras
- †Sutherlandia
- †Tesuquea
- †Triboloceras – tentative report
- †Tripteroceroides – tentative report
- Trypanites
- †Tylonautilus
- †Valhallites
- †Wilkingia
- †Zia

== Mesozoic ==
=== Selected Mesozoic taxa of Arkansas ===
- †Anomia
- †Baculites
  - †Baculites crickmayi
  - †Baculites ovatus
- Botula
  - †Botula conchafodentis
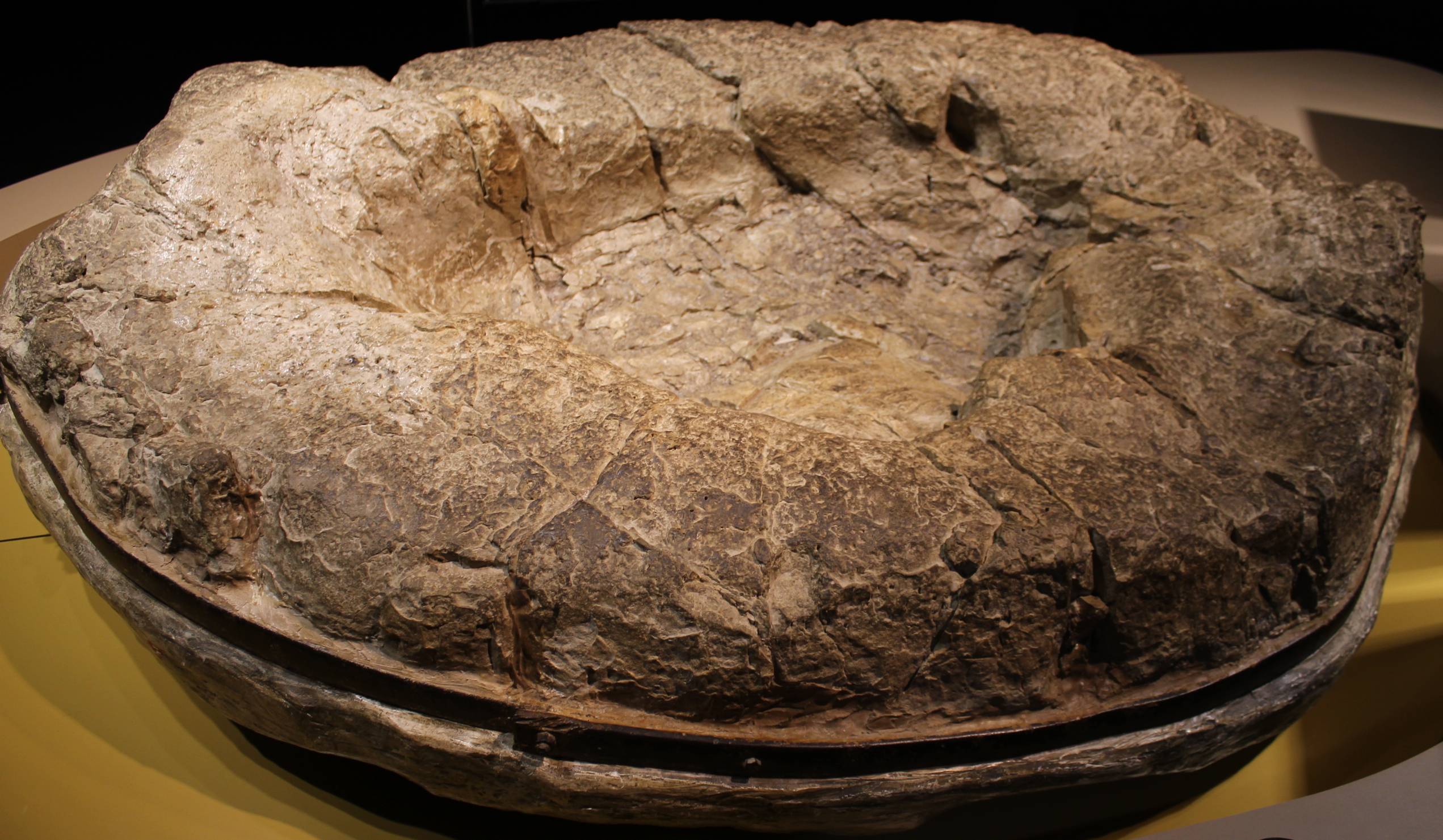
- Fossil of the sauropod dinosaur footprint ichnogenus Brontopodus
  †Brontopodus
- Cadulus
- Caestocorbula
  - †Caestocorbula crassaplica
  - †Caestocorbula crassiplica
- Caryophyllia
- †Cirroceras
- Cliona
- Corbicula
- †Crenella
  - †Crenella serica
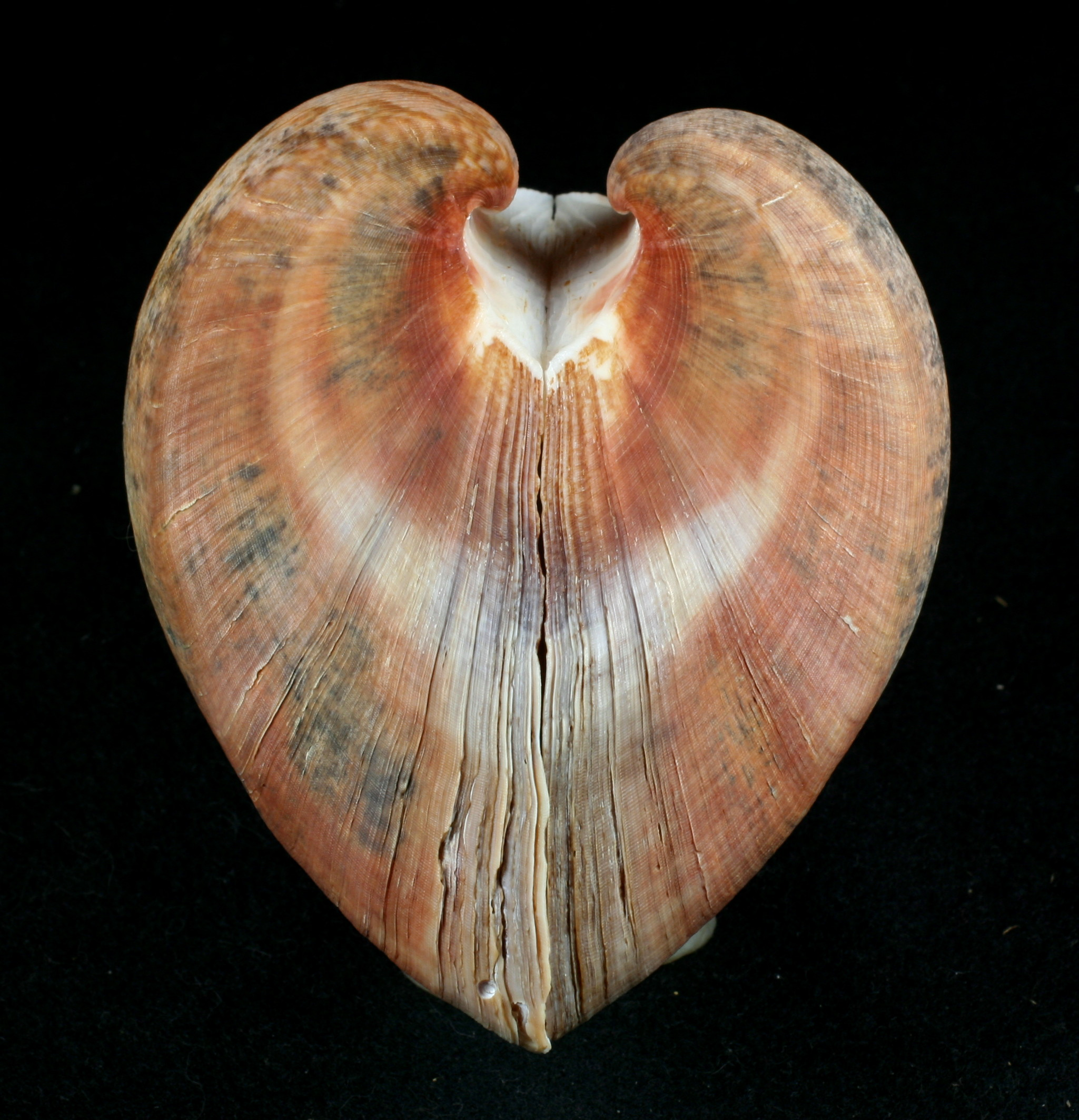
- Shell of a Cucullaea, or false ark shell
  Cucullaea
  - †Cucullaea capax
- Cylichna
- †Cymella
- †Dentalium
  - †Dentalium leve
- †Desmophyllites
- †Didymoceras
  - †Didymoceras binodosum
  - †Didymoceras platycostatum
- †Discoscaphites
  - †Discoscaphites conradi
- †Douvilleiceras
- †Echinocorys
- †Eutrephoceras
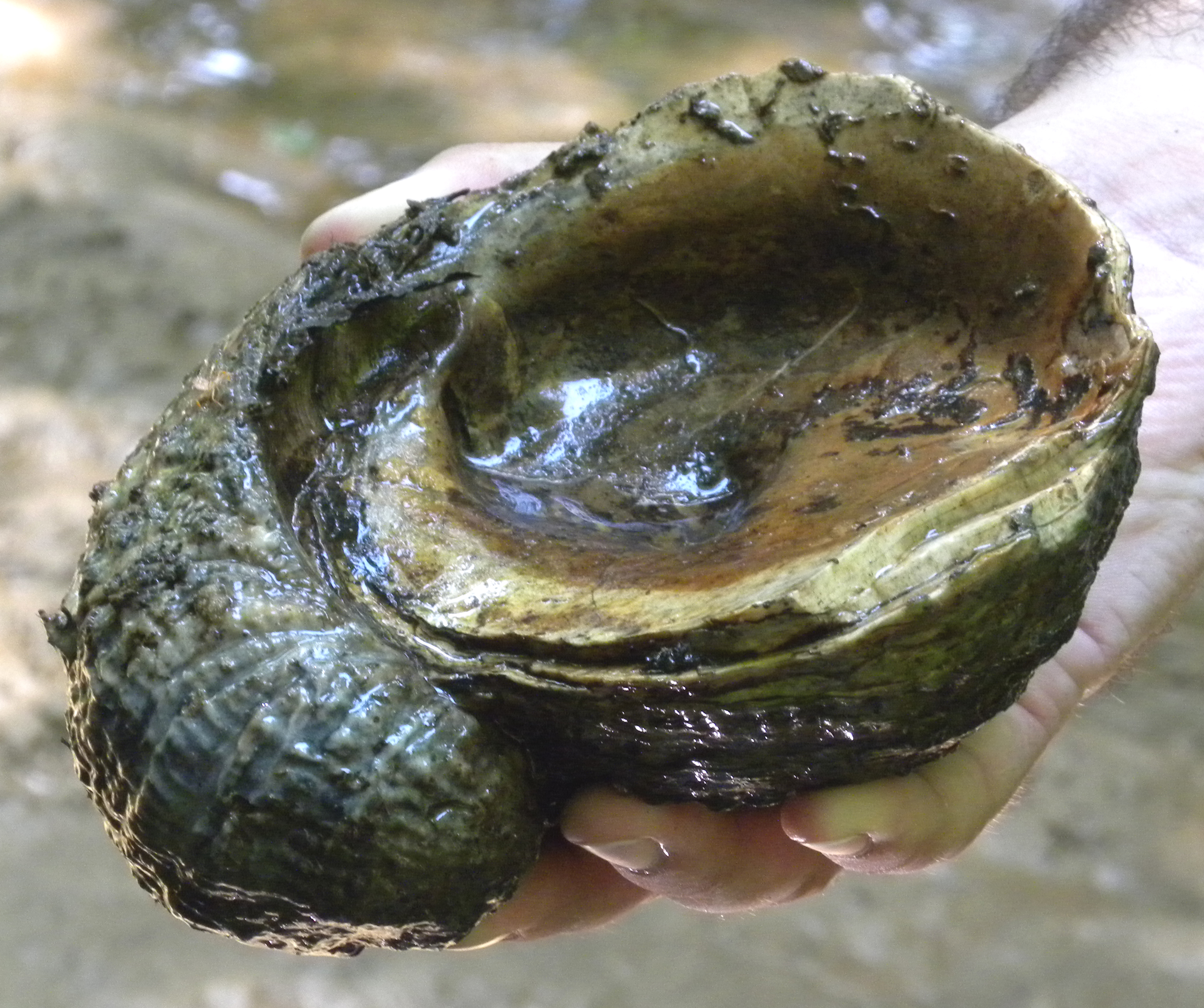
- Interior of a fossilized shell of the Jurassic-Cretaceous foam oyster Exogyra
  †Exogyra
  - †Exogyra costata
  - †Exogyra ponderosa
- †Gaudryceras
- †Heminautilus
- †Hoploscaphites
- †Inoceramus
- †Jeletzkytes
  - †Jeletzkytes nodosus
- Limatula
- †Linthia
- †Mathilda
- †Menuites
- †Micraster
- Micropora – tentative report
- †Naomichelys
- †Nostoceras
  - †Nostoceras approximans
- †Pachydiscus
- Panopea
- †Placenticeras
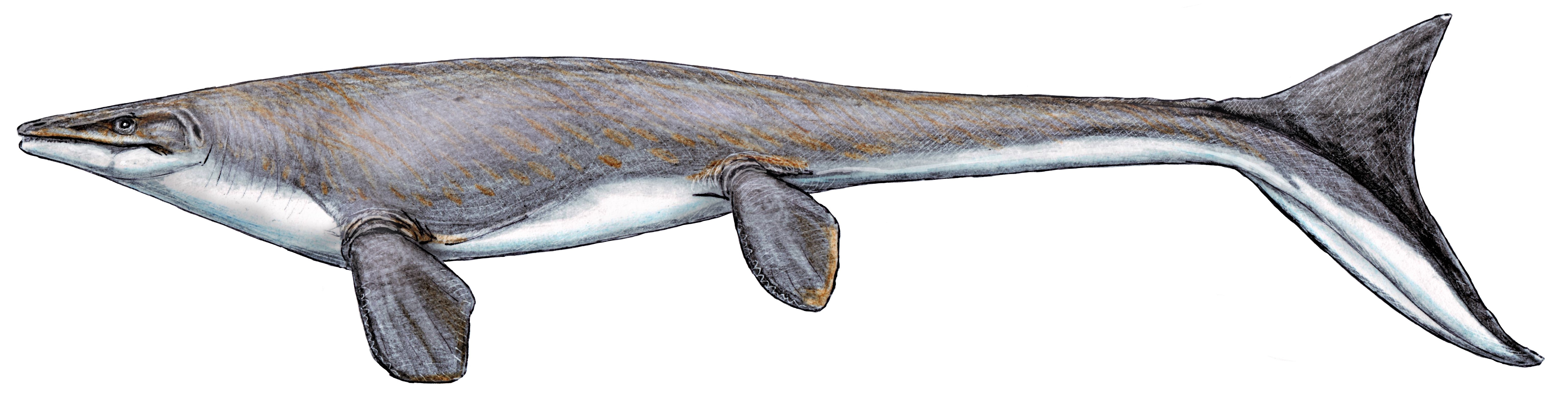
- Restoration of the Late Cretaceous mosasaur Platecarpus
  †Platecarpus
- †Protocardia
- †Pteria
- †Pterotrigonia
  - †Pterotrigonia thoracica
- Pycnodonte
  - †Pycnodonte vesicularis
- Serpula
- †Sphenodiscus
- Spondylus
- †Stylina
- †Tenea
- †Thamnasteria
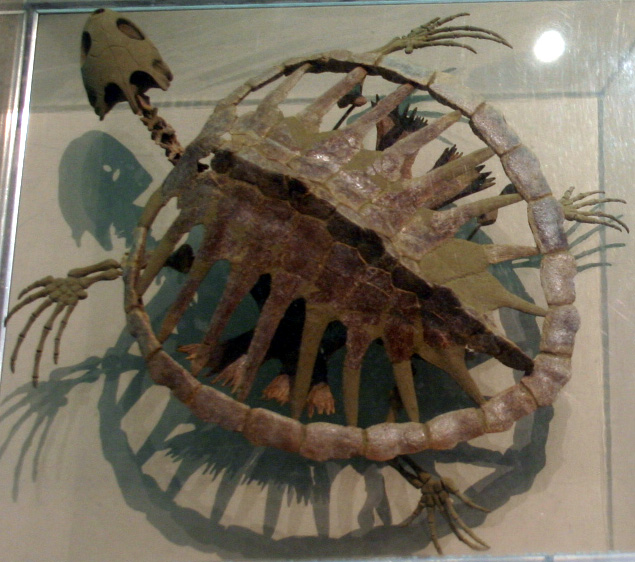
- Mounted fossilized skeleton of the Late Cretaceous sea turtle Toxochelys
  †Toxochelys – type locality for genus
  - †Toxochelys latiremis – type locality for species
- Trachycardium
- Turritella
  - †Turritella bilira
  - †Turritella trilira
- †Uhligella – tentative report

== Cenozoic ==
=== Selected Cenozoic taxa of Arkansas ===
- Acteon
- Agaronia
- Antalis
- Architectonica
- Arius – or unidentified comparable form
- Astrangia
- Athleta
- Barbatia
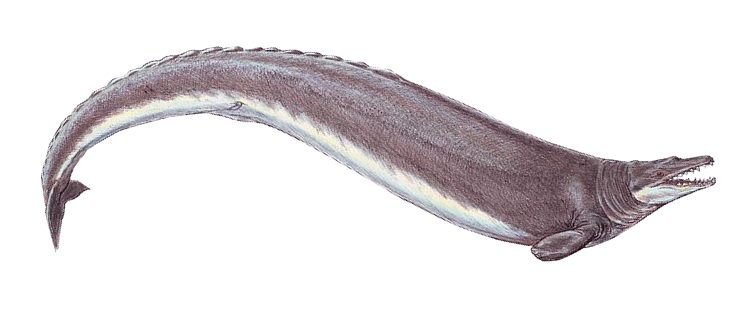
- Life restoration of the Eocene whale Basilosaurus
  †Basilosaurus
  - †Basilosaurus cetoides
- Blarina
  - †Blarina brevicauda
- †Bootherium
  - †Bootherium bombifrons
- Brachidontes
- †Brachyprotoma
  - †Brachyprotoma obtusata
- Bullia
- Caestocorbula
- Canis
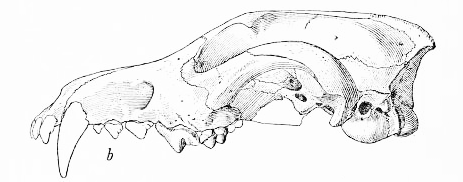
  - Illustration of a fossilized cranium of the Pleistocene Canis armbrusteri, or Armbruster's wolf
    †Canis armbrusteri
  - †Canis latrans
- Carcharhinus
- Carcharias
- Castor
  - †Castor canadensis
- Cervus
- Chlamys
- Clavilithes
- Coluber
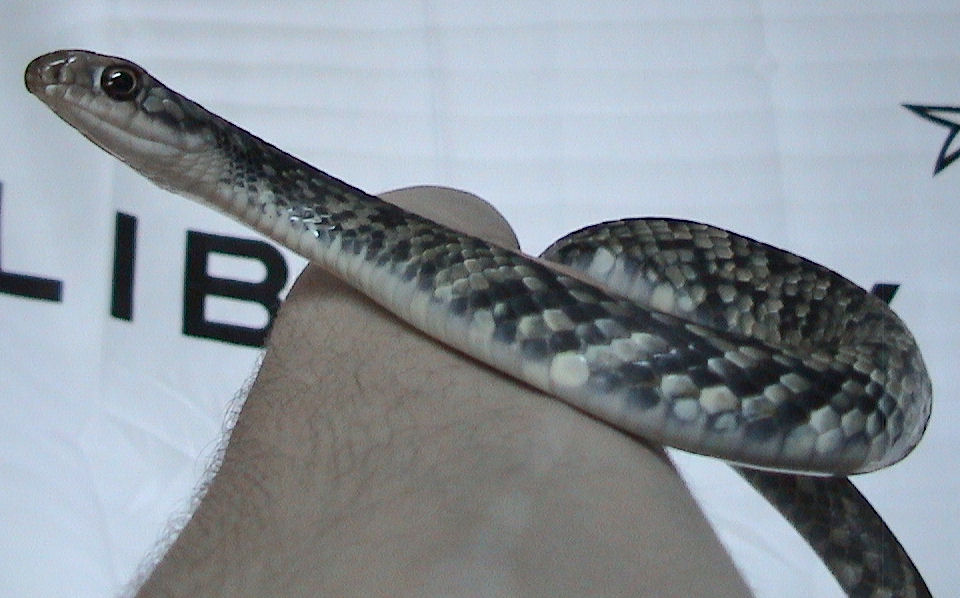
  - A living Coluber constrictor, or eastern racer
    †Coluber constrictor – or unidentified comparable form
- Conomitra
- Conus
- Corbula
- Crassostrea
- Crotalus
- Cytherea – report made of unidentified related form or using admittedly obsolete nomenclature
- Dasyatis
- Dentalium
- †Diaphyodus
- Epitonium
- Eptesicus
  - †Eptesicus fuscus
- Equus
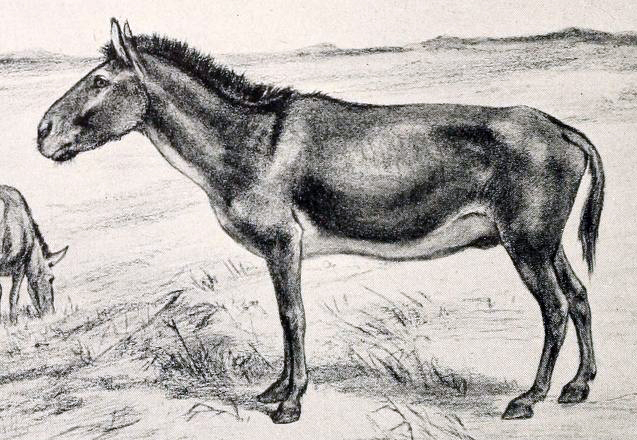
  - Restoration of the Pliocene-Holocene horse Equus scotti, or Scott's horse
    †Equus scotti – tentative report
- Erethizon
  - †Erethizon dorsatum
- Galeocerdo
- Galeodea
- Galeorhinus
- Geomys
  - †Geomys bursarius
- Ginglymostoma
- Hemipristis
  - †Hemipristis curvatus
- Hemisinus
- Hexaplex
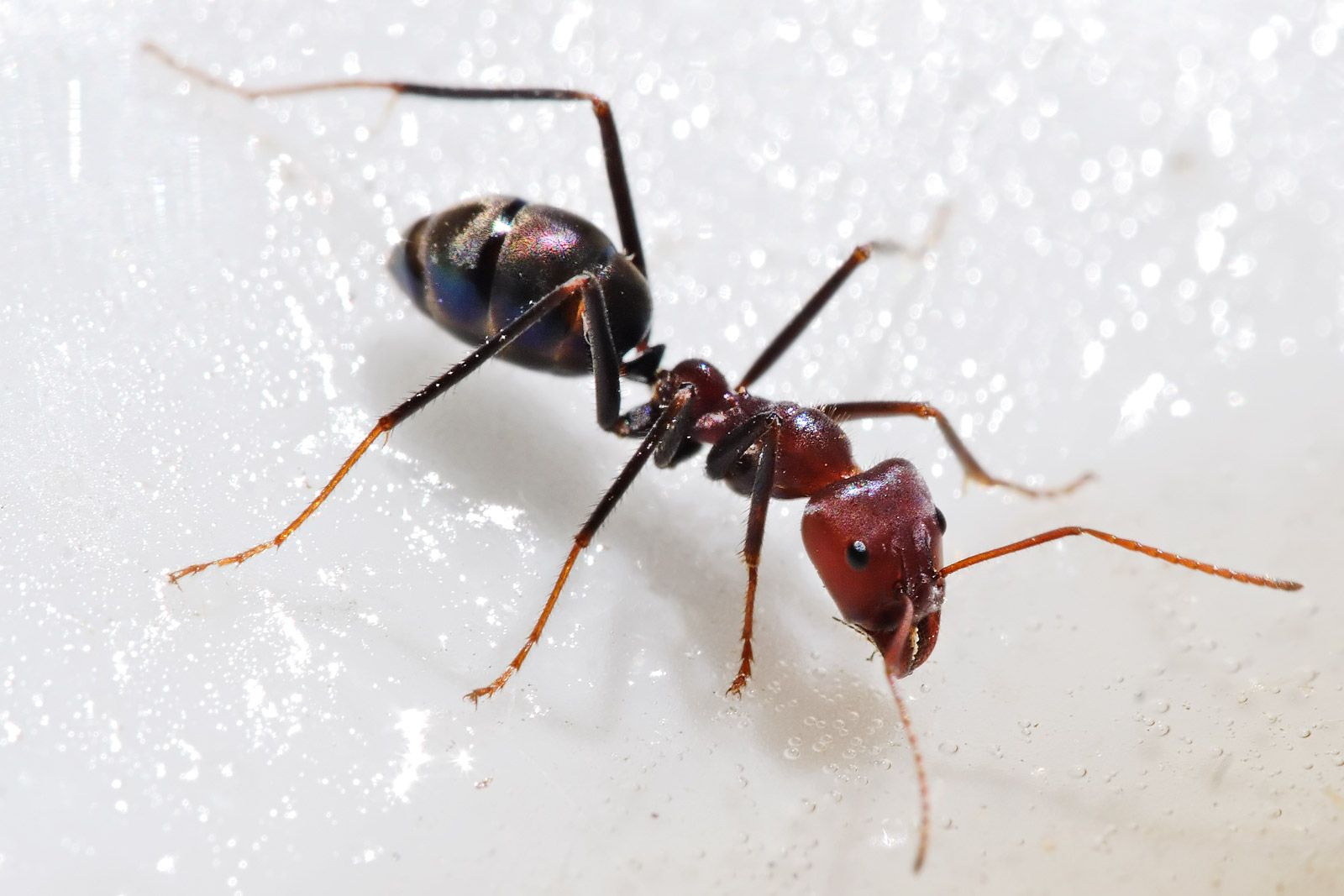
- A living Iridomyrmex, or rainbow ant
  †Iridomyrmex
  - †Iridomyrmex mapesi – type locality for species
- †Lacunaria
- Latirus
- Lepisosteus
- Lepus
  - †Lepus alleni
  - †Lepus americanus – tentative report
- †Linthia
- Lynx
  - †Lynx rufus
- †Mammuthus
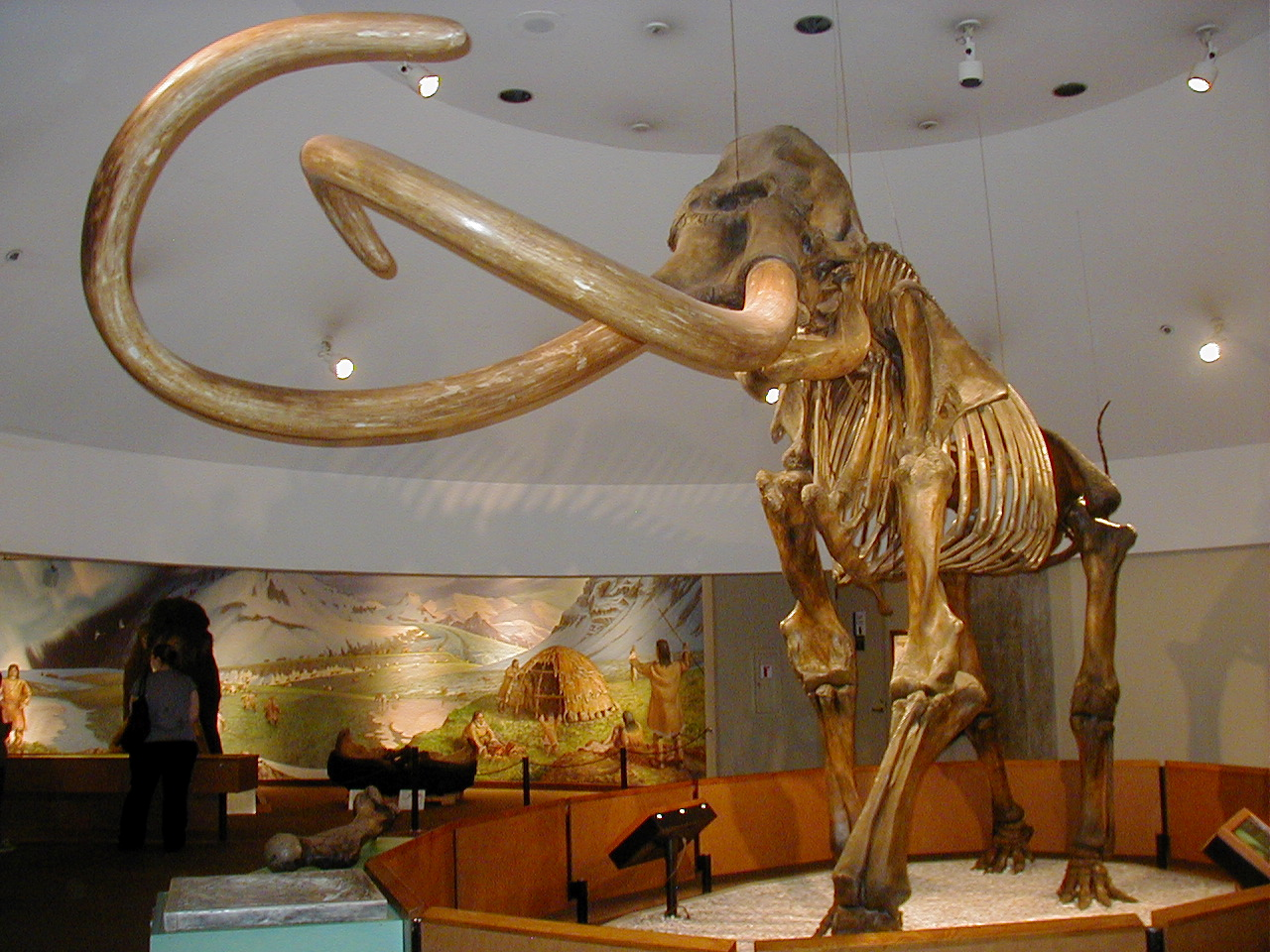
  - Mounted fossilized skeleton of a Mammuthus columbi or Columbian mammoth
    †Mammuthus columbi
- Marmota
  - †Marmota monax
- Mephitis
  - †Mephitis mephitis
- Mesalia
- Microtus
- †Miracinonyx
  - †Miracinonyx studeri
- Mustela
  - †Mustela richardsonii
- Myliobatis
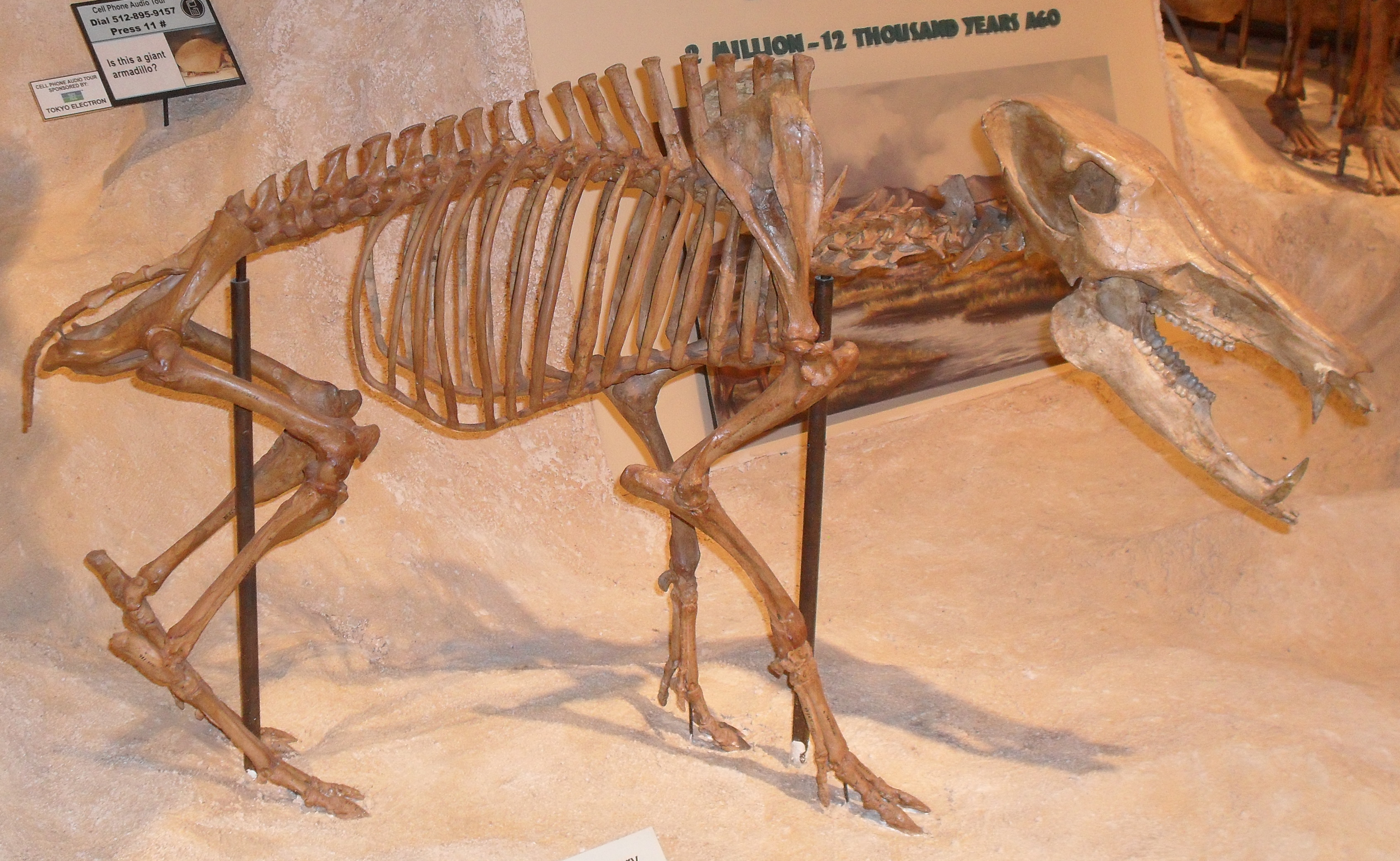
- Fossilized skeleton of the Pliocene-Holocene peccary Mylohyus
  †Mylohyus
  - †Mylohyus fossilis
- Myotis
- Mytilus
- Nassarius
- Neogale
  - †Neogale frenata
  - †Neogale vison
- Neotoma
- Nucula
- Odocoileus
  - †Odocoileus virginianus
- Ondatra
- Ostrea
- †Pachecoa
- Panthera
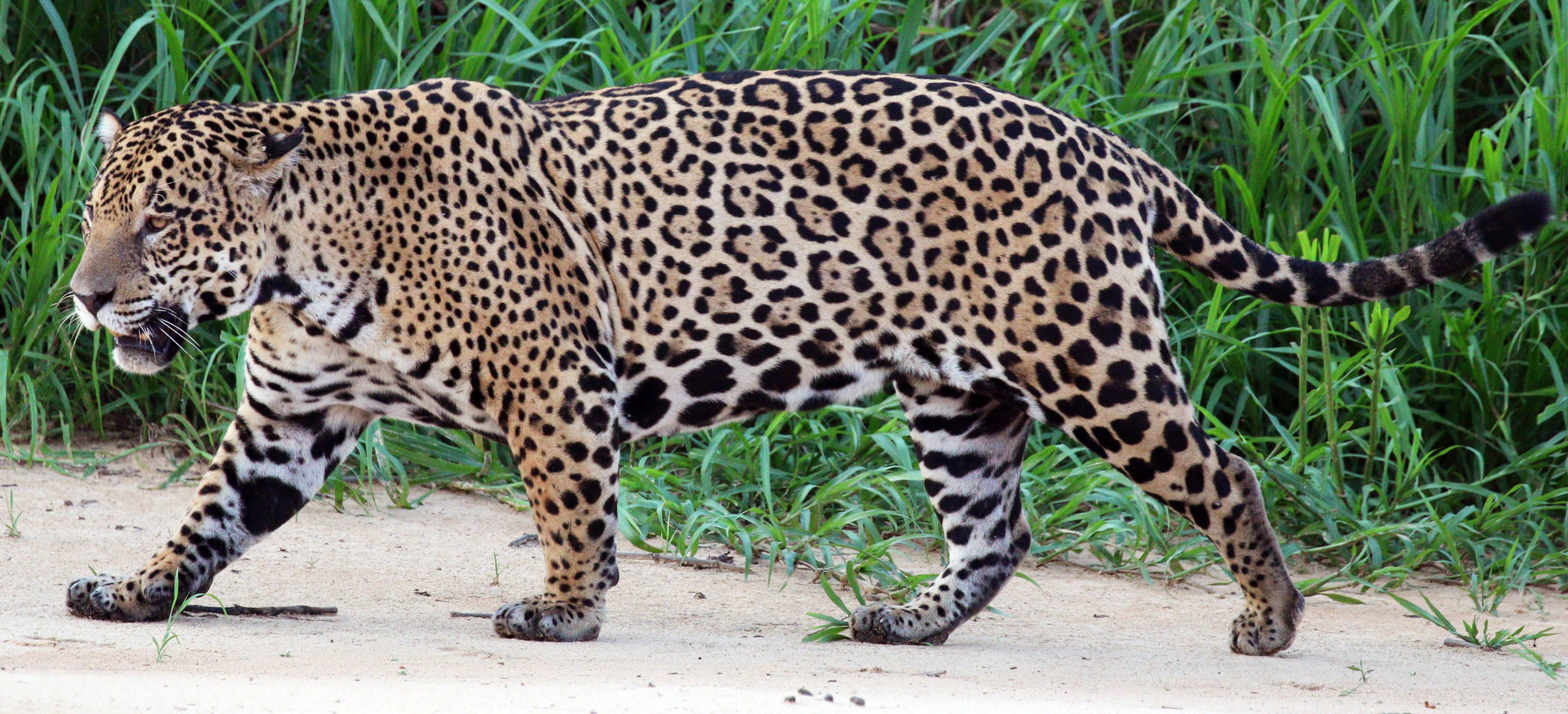
  - A living Panthera onca, or jaguar
    †Panthera onca
- Pekania
- Peromyscus
- Pitar
- Pituophis
- Pitymys
- Pleuromeris
- Polinices
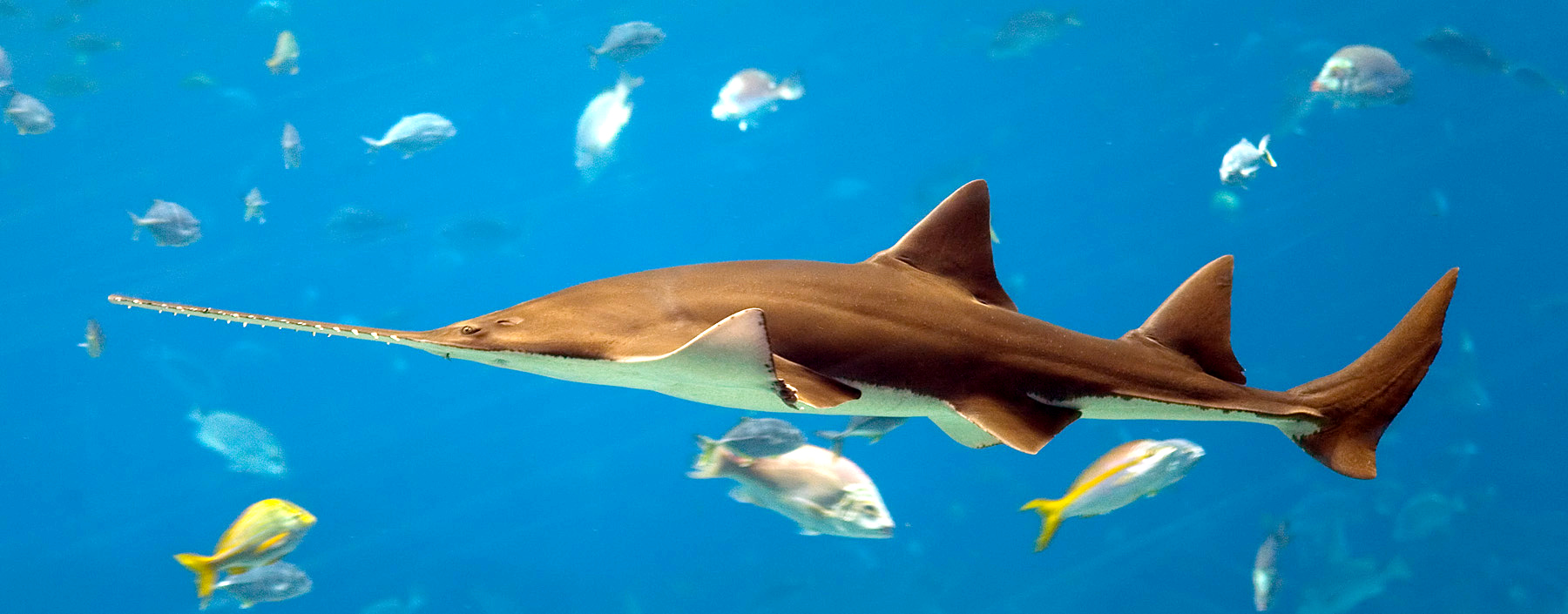
- A living Pristis sawfish
  Pristis
- Procyon
  - †Procyon lotor
- Propeamussium
- †Protocardia – report made of unidentified related form or using admittedly obsolete nomenclature
- Pseudoliva
- Reithrodontomys
- Retusa
- Scalopus
  - †Scalopus aquaticus
- †Sinistrella
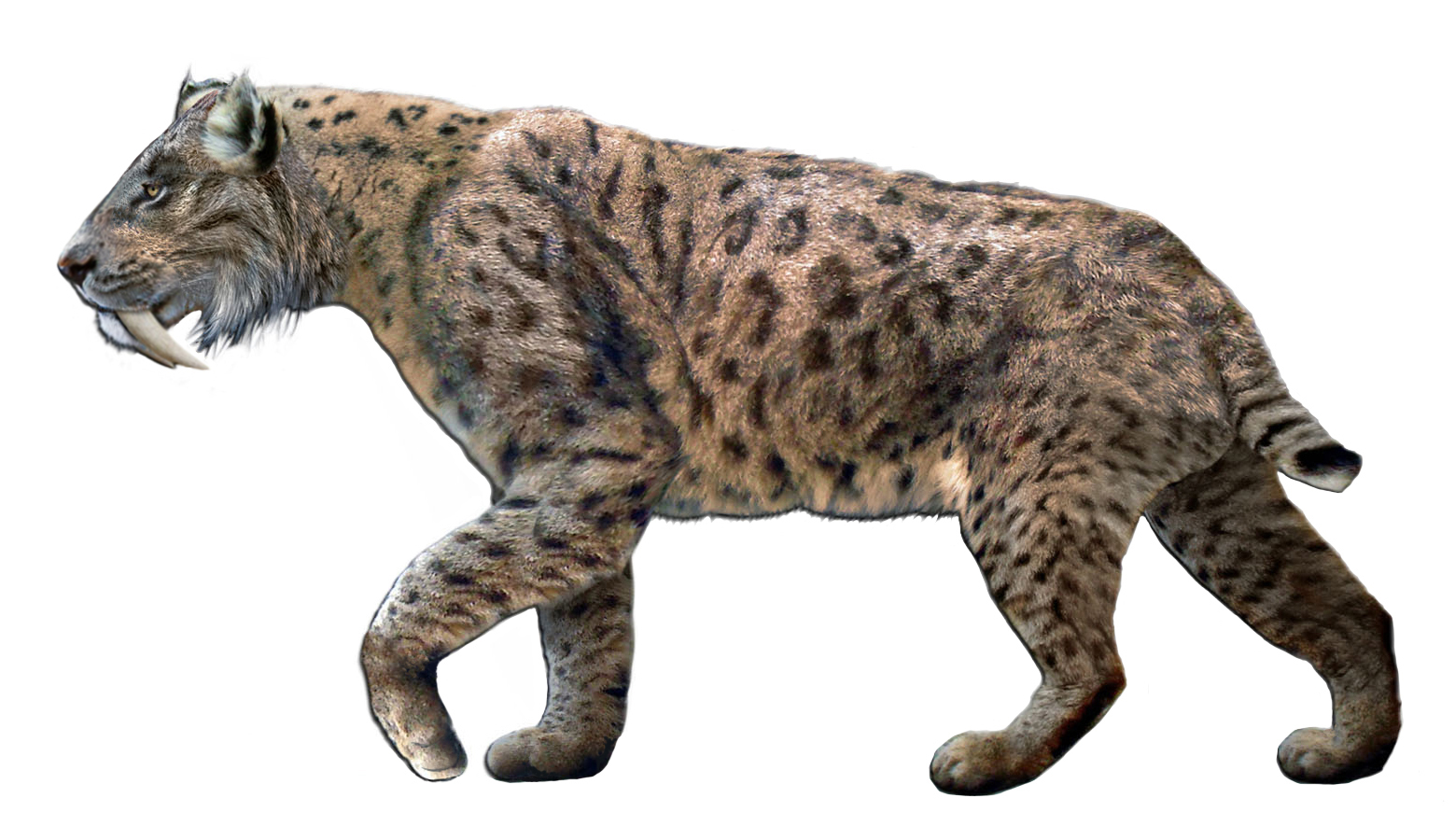
- Life restoration of the Pleistocene-Holocene saber-tooth cat Smilodon
  †Smilodon
  - †Smilodon fatalis
- Sorex
  - †Sorex cinereus
  - †Sorex fumeus
  - †Sorex minutus
  - †Sorex monticolus
- Spermophilus
  - †Spermophilus tridecemlineatus – tentative report
- Sphyraena
- Spilogale
  - †Spilogale putorius – tentative report
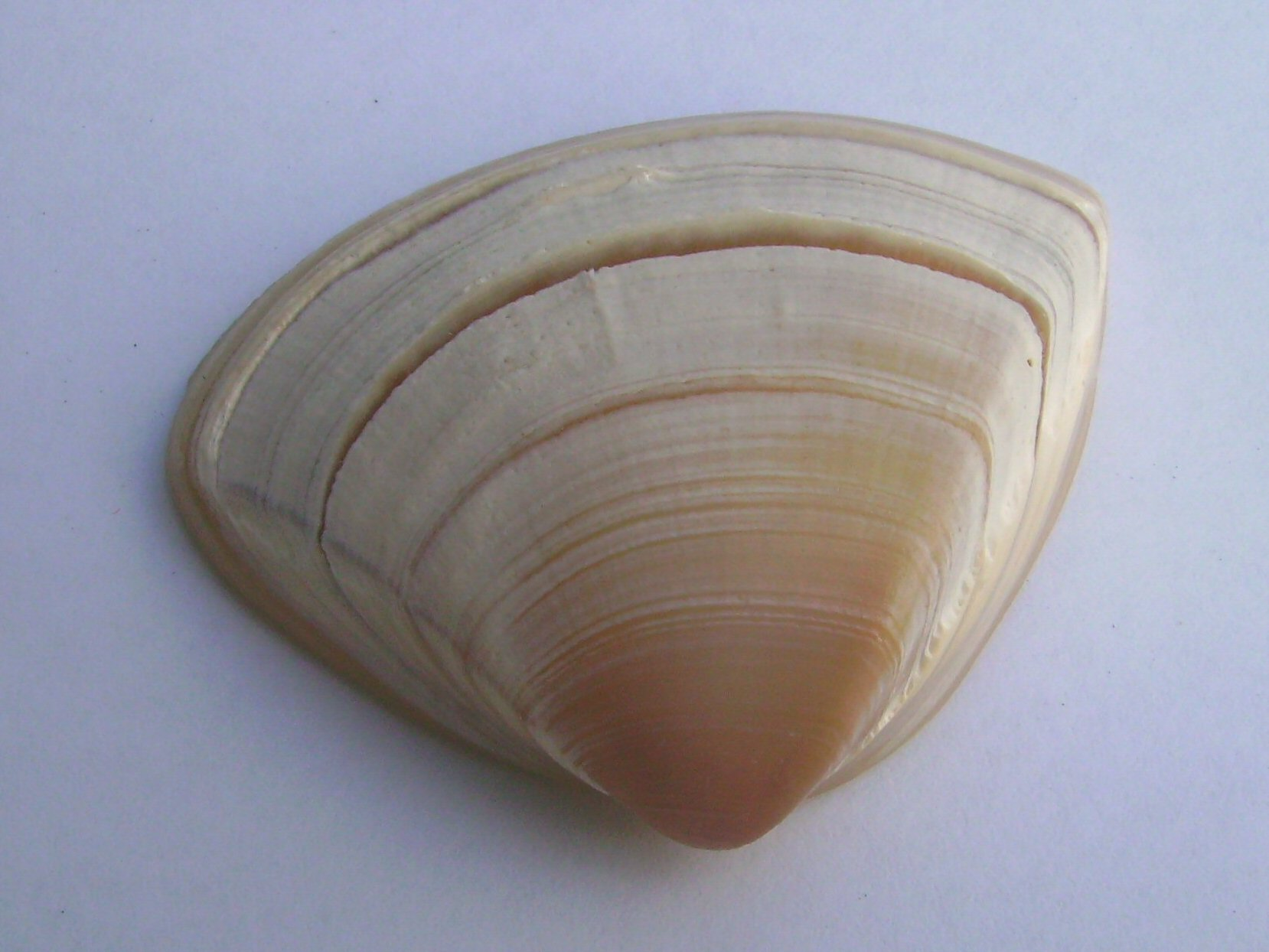
- Shell of a Spisula, or surf clam
  Spisula
- Sylvilagus
  - †Sylvilagus floridanus – tentative report
- Tamiasciurus
  - †Tamiasciurus hudsonicus
- Terebra
- Teredo
- Trichiurus
- Turritella
- Urocyon
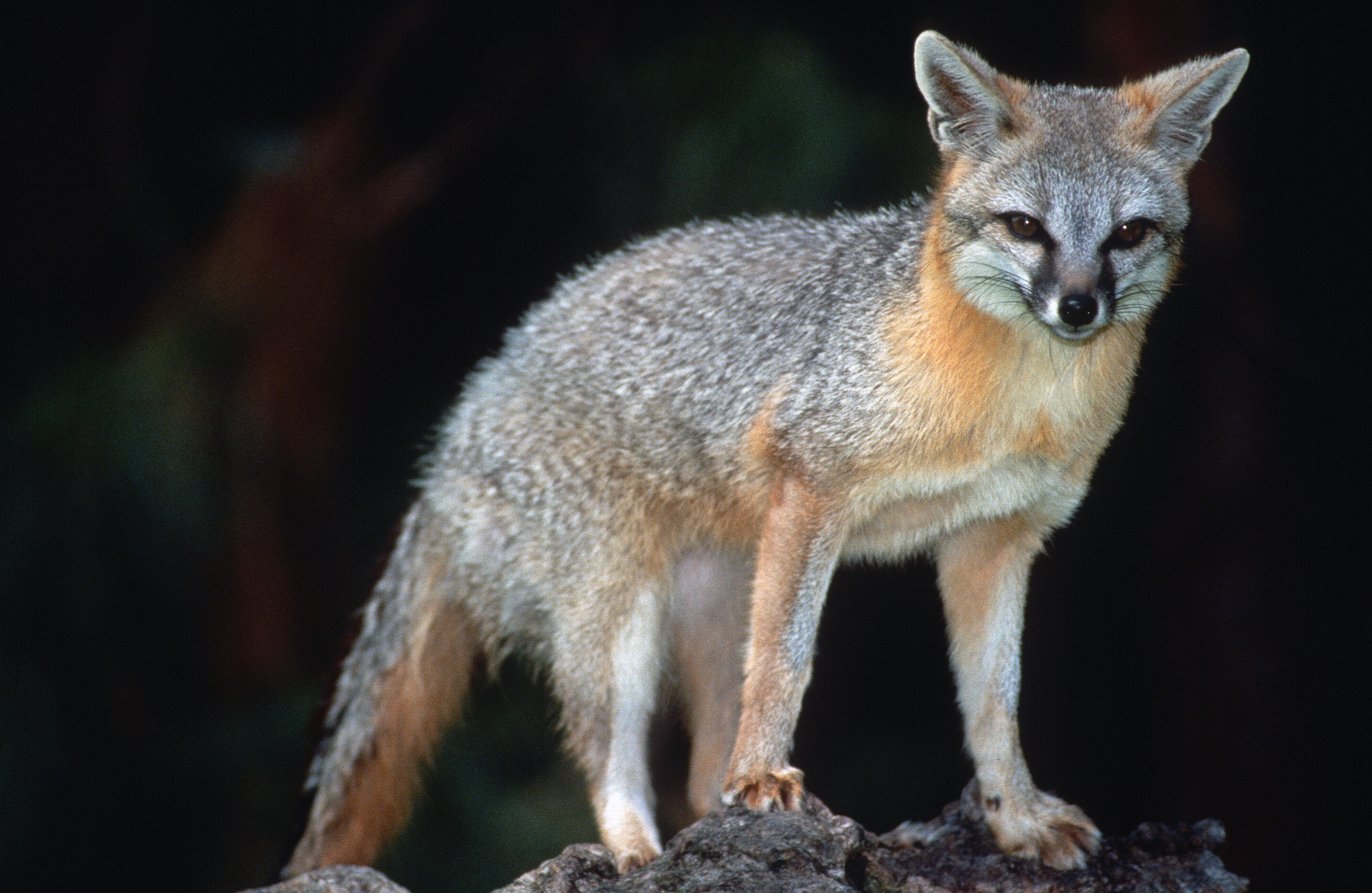
  - A living Urocyon cinereoargenteus, or gray fox
    †Urocyon cinereoargenteus
- Ursus
  - †Ursus americanus
- Venericardia
- Vulpes
- Yoldia
