= Styrionautilus =

Styrionautilus Temporal range: Middle-Late Triassic (Nor)

Scientific classification
- Domain: Eukaryota
- Kingdom: Animalia
- Phylum: Mollusca
- Class: Cephalopoda
- Subclass: Nautiloidea
- Order: Nautilida
- Family: †Clydonautilidae
- Genus: †Styrionautilus; Mojsisovics, 1902

Extinct genus of molluscs

Styrionautilus is a genus of nautiloids and first of the Clydonautilidae with a range extending from the Middle Triassic, Anisian to the Upper Triassic, Norian. Its fossils have been found in North America (Nevada), Europe, and Timor.

In general form Styrionautilus is similar to other clydonautilids, smooth and involute. The suture however is more primitive. The ventral saddle is straight across without modification of a median lobe.

Styrionautilus may be derived from Indionautilus or similar form included in the Liroceratidae. In turn Styrionautilus is the likely ancestor of Proclydonautilus, Cosmonautilus, and/or Callaionautilus
