= Condraoceras =

Condraoceras Temporal range: Pennsylvanian – Late Permian

Scientific classification
- Kingdom: Animalia
- Phylum: Mollusca
- Class: Cephalopoda
- Subclass: Nautiloidea
- Order: Nautilida
- Family: †Liroceratidae
- Genus: †Condraoceras; Miller, et al, 1947

Extinct genus of molluscs

Condraoceras is a genus of liroceratids from the Pennsylvanian of North America and Lower Permian of Europe with a compressed, involute, nautiliconic shell; subcircular whorl section; small umbilicus with a rounded shoulder; suture with shallow ventral and lateral lobes; and narrow subcentral siphuncle.

Liroceras, from the same time and type of the family, differs in having a reniform whorl section and essentially straight sutures at maturity. Peripetoceras, another related genus, has a flattened venter, slight ventral and lateral lobes in the suture, and a siphuncle offset dorsally from the center.
