= Liroceras =

Liroceras Temporal range: Mississippian (L Carb) - Permian

Scientific classification
- Domain: Eukaryota
- Kingdom: Animalia
- Phylum: Mollusca
- Class: Cephalopoda
- Subclass: Nautiloidea
- Order: Nautilida
- Family: †Liroceratidae
- Genus: †Liroceras; Teichert, 1940

Extinct genus of nautiloids

Liroceras is a genus of nautiloid cephalopod. It is the type genus of the clydonautiliacean family, Liroceratidae, and is characterized by a rapidly expanding, subglobular, nautiliconic shell with a reniform whorl section, small umbilicus, essentially straight sutures, and a siphuncle with a variable but not marginal position.

Liroceras has a temporal range from the Mississippian to the Permian period, the longest of the Liroceratidae. It has been found in North America, Europe, China and the East Indies. A similar genus, Condraoceras, differs in having a circular cross section and shallow ventral and lateral lobes. Another, Bistrialites, also has a reniform whorl section but differs in having a large funnel-shaped umbilicus.
