= Ephippioceratidae =

Ephippioceratidae Temporal range: Miss - L Perm

Scientific classification
- Domain: Eukaryota
- Kingdom: Animalia
- Phylum: Mollusca
- Class: Cephalopoda
- Subclass: Nautiloidea
- Order: Nautilida
- Superfamily: †Clydonautiloidea
- Family: †Ephippioceratidae; Miller & Youngquist, 1949

Extinct family of nautiloids

Ephippioceratidae is a family of clydonatilacean nautilids with shells as in the Liroceratidae but with sutures that have deep ventral and dorsal saddles. This group, which contains two genera, Ephippioceras and Megaglossoceras, has a range from the Mississippian to the Lower Permian.

Ephippioceras, which has the full range of the family, has a broad, narrowly peaked ( V-shaped) ventral saddle and may have been derived from Liroceras early in the Mississippian. Megaglossoceras from the Pennsylvanian of North America, with its large, broadly arched, tongue-like ventral saddle is an obvious offshoot of Ephippioceras. Both are subglobular and involute with a reniform whorl section. Ephippioceras has been found in North America, Europe, and China.
