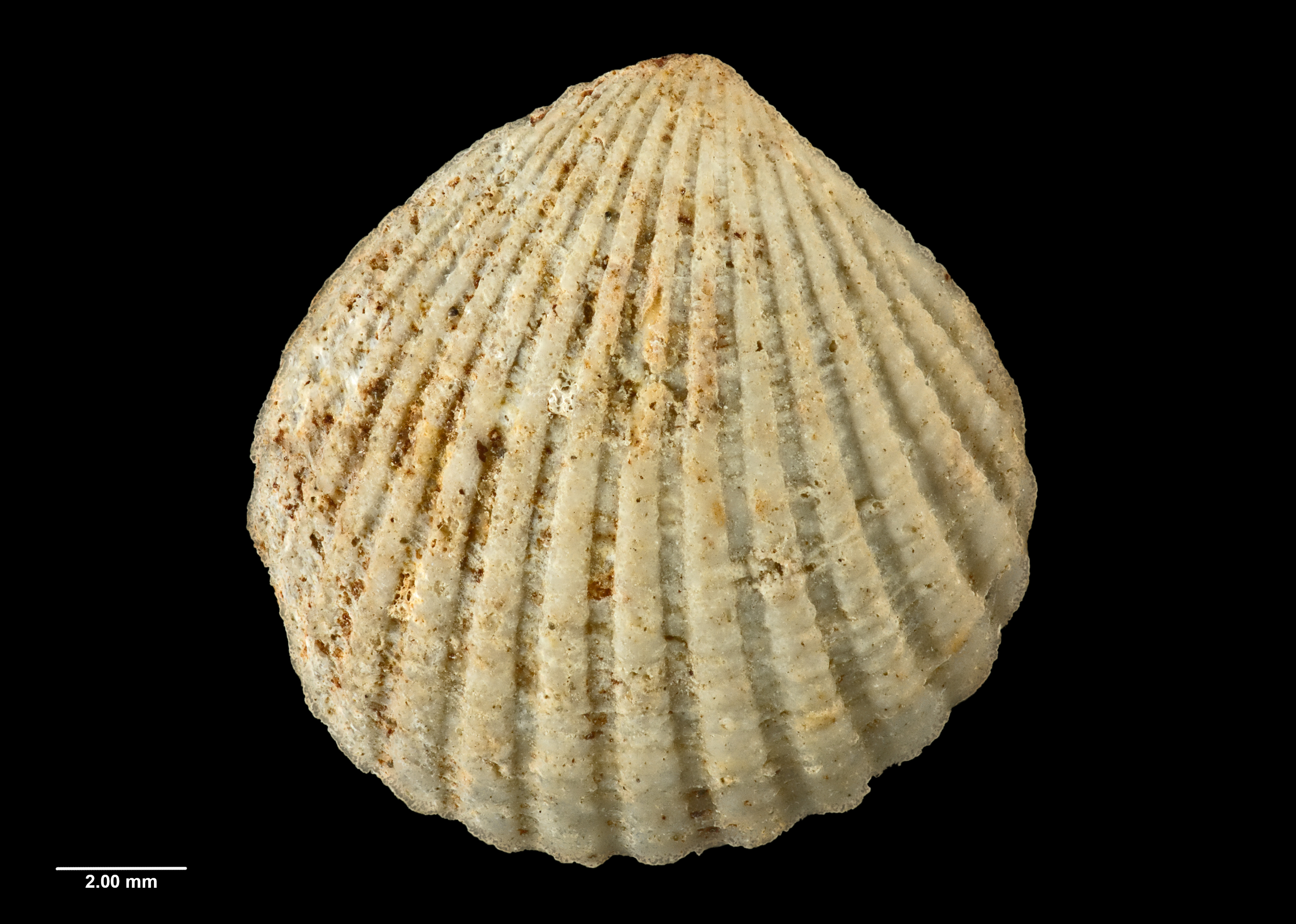
- Holotype from Auckland War Memorial Museum

Scientific classification
- Kingdom: Animalia
- Phylum: Mollusca
- Class: Bivalvia
- Order: Carditida
- Family: Carditidae
- Genus: Pleuromeris
- Species: P. hectori

Binomial name
- Pleuromeris hectori A. W. B. Powell, 1938

= Pleuromeris hectori =

Pleuromeris hectori Temporal range: 2.4 –Recent Ma

Species of gastropod

Pleuromeris hectori is a species of marine bivalve mollusc in the family Carditidae. It is endemic to New Zealand, found primarily off the north-eastern coast of the North Island. Fossils of the species date back to at least the Nukumaruan stage of the Early Pleistocene (2.4 million years ago).

== Description ==
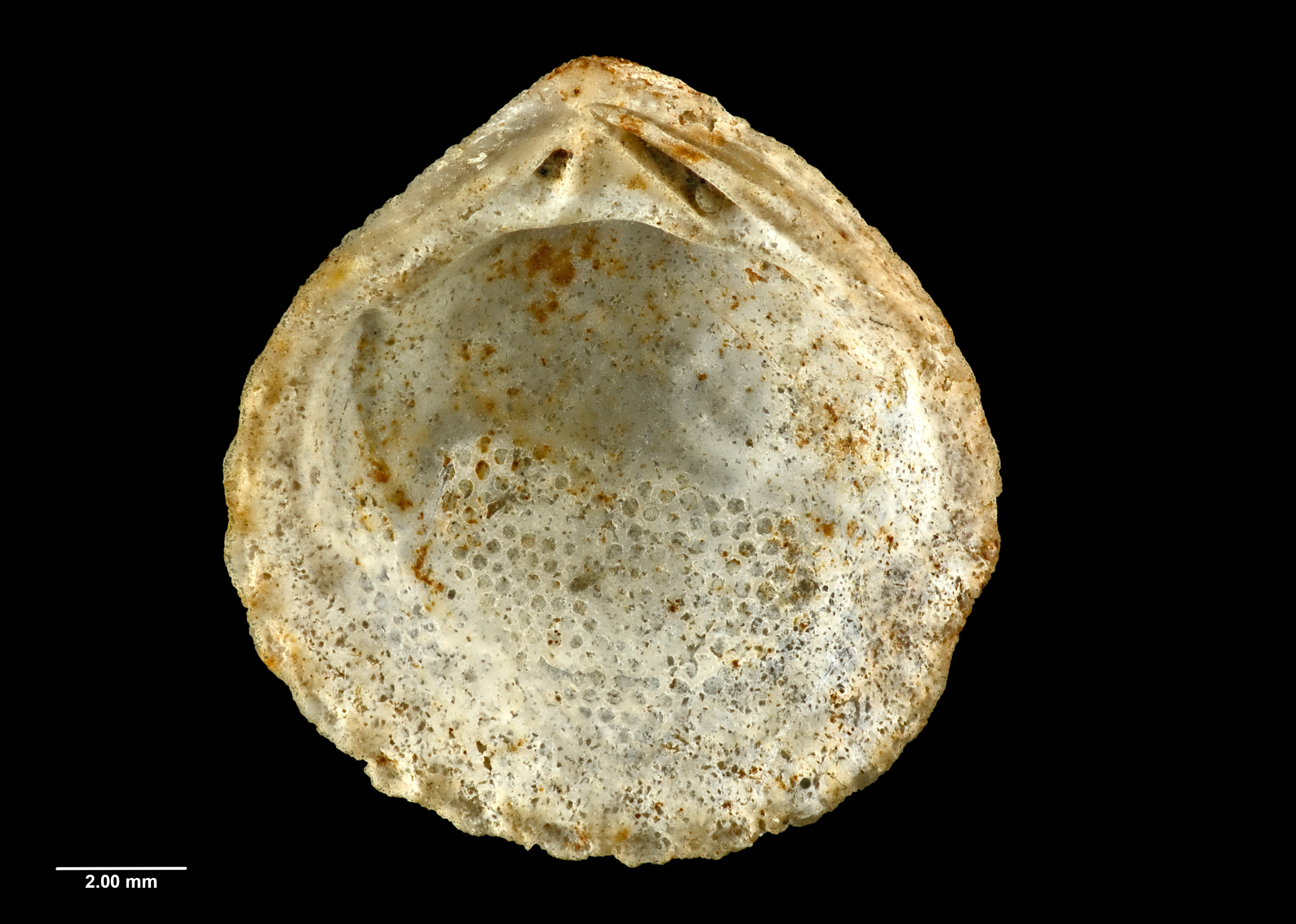
Reverse view of holotype

In the original description, Powell described the species as follows:

Shell moderately large, subcircular, subequilateral, beaks almost central, high and rounded. Lunule flattened, large, lanceolate and smooth. Escutcheon long and narrow, smooth. Sculptured with eighteen prominent broad, flattened, regularly beaded radial ribs with interspaces less than half the width of the ribs. Hinge of left valve with two strong divergent cardinals forming an angle of about 65°; both cardinals separated from the dorsal margins. Anterior and posterior laterals present. Hinge of right valve with a massive triangular median cardinal and anterior and posterior rudimentary cardinals. Anterior and posterior laterals present.

The holotype of the species has a height of 12.75 mm (0.502 in), length of 12.5 mm (0.49 in) and a single valve thickness of 4 mm (0.16 in). It is large for New Zealand members of Pleuromeris, and has a slightly protruding umbo in front of the centre. Radial costae typically number between 20 and 24.

It can be differentiated from P. zelandica due to having a different outline and sculpture, being more rotund, having more numerous and boarder ribs with narrower interspaces.

== Taxonomy ==
The species was first described by A.W.B. Powell in 1938. The taxonomy of P. hectori, P. finlayi and P. zelandica is poorly understood, as small specimens appear identical to P. zelandica, while large specimens have more closely spaced radial costae which are lower and wider. P. hectori may represent a distinct species, or may represent large members of P. zelandica. The holotype was a fossil collected at a date prior to 1939 from lighthouse reef, Castlepoint, Wairarapa, New Zealand, and is held by the Auckland War Memorial Museum.

== Distribution and habitat ==
The species is endemic to New Zealand, found off the coast of the north-eastern North Island between Cape Reinga and Hawkes Bay, at depths ranging between 15–188 m (49–617 ft). Fossils of the species occur between Early Pleistocene (Nukumaruan stage) strata and recent of New Zealand dating to between 2.4 million years ago and the present day, and potentially as far back as the Late Pliocene Mangapanian stage (3 million years before present). Fossils have been found in the Castlepoint Formation (Castlepoint, Wairarapa), the Whariki Formation (near Parikino, Whanganui District), Tuha Shellbed in the Rangitīkei Valley at Otara Road near Ōhingaiti (Rangitikei District / Manawatū District) and near Napier.
