= Siberionautilidae =

Siberionautilidae Temporal range: U Triassic (Carn)

Scientific classification
- Domain: Eukaryota
- Kingdom: Animalia
- Phylum: Mollusca
- Class: Cephalopoda
- Subclass: Nautiloidea
- Order: Nautilida
- Superfamily: †Clydonautiloidea
- Family: †Siberionautilidae; Popov, 1951

Extinct family of nautiloids

Siberionautilidae is a family in the nautilid superfamily Clydonautiloidea that contains only the genus Siberionautilus, which comes from the Upper Triassic (Carnian) of Siberia, Russia.

The family, and genus, are characterized by an involute, globular shell covered by fine radial ribs, with flattened flanks that converge toward a rounded venter, distinct umbilicus with rounded shoulders, differentiated suture, and central siphuncle. The suture is goniatitic with the ventral or median saddle of the Clydonautilidae, subdivided so as to have a deep finger-like median ventral lobe bracketed by finder-like secondary lobes and saddles, and on either side, a large claw-like asymmetric lateral lobe.

Like Gonionautilus, Siberionautilus is derived from the Clydonautilidae, only the genus is unspecified. As with Gonionautilus and more advanced Clydonautilidae, Siberionautilus is one of a handful of nautilids that have goniatitic sutures as found in primitive ammonoids.
