= Callaionautilus =

Callaionautilus Temporal range: Late Triassic

Scientific classification
- Kingdom: Animalia
- Phylum: Mollusca
- Class: Cephalopoda
- Subclass: Nautiloidea
- Order: Nautilida
- Family: †Clydonautilidae
- Genus: †Callaionautilus; Kieslinger 1924

Extinct genus of molluscs

Callaionautilus is a genus of cephalopods included in the nautilid family Clydonautilidae that lived during the Late Triassic. Its fossils have been found on the island of Timor.

The shell of Callaionautilus is involute, coiled such that only the outer whorl is exposed. Early whorls have nodes on the ventral shoulder that disappear toward the aperture. Later whorls have a nodose keel bordered by furrows. The siphuncle position is unknown.

Clydonautilus, Cosmonautilus, Proclydonautilus, and Styrionautilus are closely related genera belonging to the same family.
