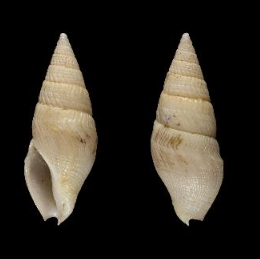
- Left-handed shell of Sinistrella sinistralis (syntype at MNHN, Paris)

Scientific classification
- Kingdom: Animalia
- Phylum: Mollusca
- Class: Gastropoda
- Subclass: Caenogastropoda
- Order: Neogastropoda
- Family: incertae sedis
- Genus: Sinistrella
- Species: S. sinistralis

Binomial name
- Sinistrella sinistralis (Petit de la Saussaye, 1839)

Synonyms
- Pleurotoma sinistralis Petit de la Saussaye, 1839

= Sinistrella sinistralis =

Species of gastropod

Sinistrella sinistralis is a left-handed species of sea snail, a marine gastropod mollusk unassigned in the superfamily Conoidea.

== Distribution ==
This marine species occurs off Senegal.
