= Mesalia opalina =

Scientific classification
- Kingdom: Animalia
- Phylum: Mollusca
- Class: Gastropoda
- Subclass: Caenogastropoda
- Order: incertae sedis
- Family: Turritellidae
- Genus: Mesalia
- Species: M. opalina

Binomial name
- Mesalia opalina (Adams & Reeve, 1850)

Synonyms
- List: Mesalia (Mesaliopsis) opalina (A. Adams & Reeve, 1849); Mesalia flammifera Locard, 1897; Mesalia flammifera var. simplex Locard, 1897; Turritella opalina A. Adams & Reeve, 1849

Species of gastropod

Mesalia opalina is a species of sea snail, a marine gastropod mollusk in the family Turritellidae.
