= Bistrialites =

Bistrialites Temporal range: Lower Carboniferous (Mississippian)

Scientific classification
- Kingdom: Animalia
- Phylum: Mollusca
- Class: Cephalopoda
- Subclass: Nautiloidea
- Order: Nautilida
- Family: †Liroceratidae
- Genus: †Bistrialites; Turner, 1954

Genus of nautiloids

Bistrialites is an involute, globose Clydonautilacean belonging to the Liroceratidae with a reniform (kidney-shaped) whorl section, large funnel-shaped umbilicus, smooth surface except for spiral ornament in the region of the umbilical shoulder. Bistrialites comes from the Lower Carboniferous (Mississippian) of Europe.
