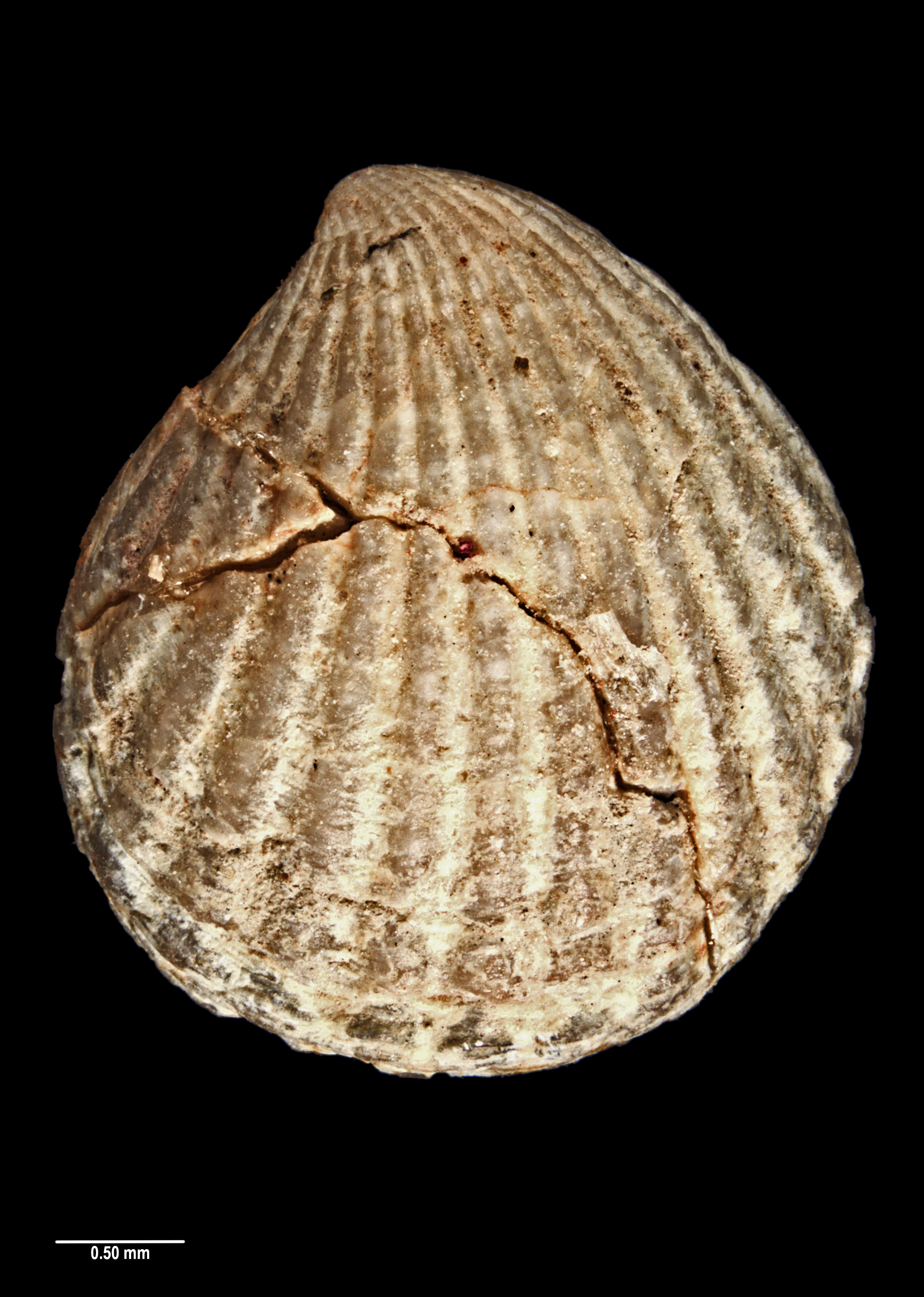
- Holotype from Auckland War Memorial Museum

Scientific classification
- Kingdom: Animalia
- Phylum: Mollusca
- Class: Bivalvia
- Order: Carditida
- Family: Carditidae
- Genus: Pleuromeris
- Species: †P. murdochi

Binomial name
- †Pleuromeris murdochi A. W. B. Powell, 1938

Synonyms
- Kolmeris murdochi (A. W. B. Powell, 1938)

= Pleuromeris murdochi =

Pleuromeris murdochi Temporal range: 2.40 Ma

Extinct species of gastropod

Pleuromeris murdochi is an extinct species of marine bivalve mollusc in the family Carditidae. Fossils of the species date to the Pleistocene in New Zealand.

== Description ==
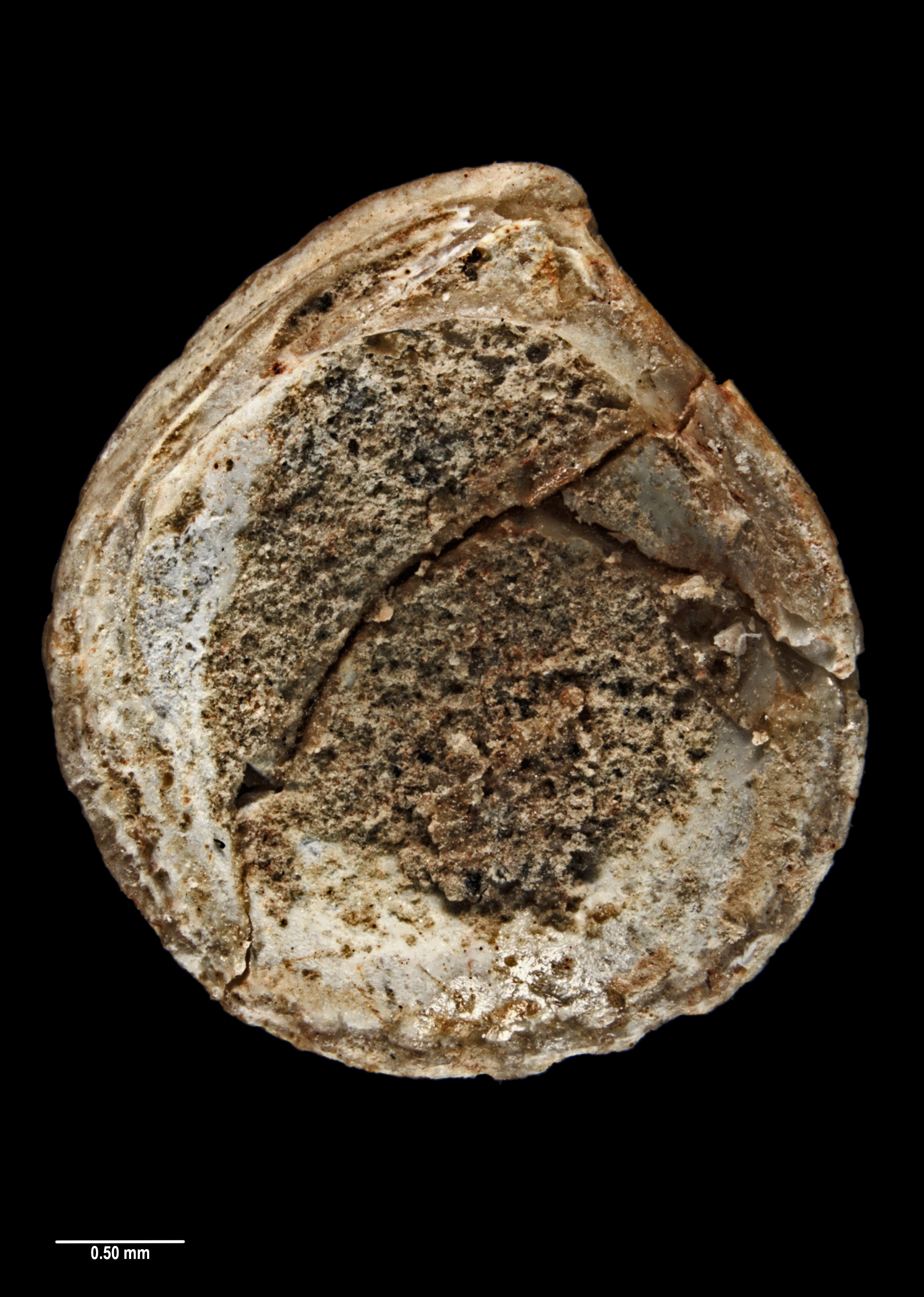
Reverse view of holotype

In the original description, Powell described the species as follows:

Shell small, narrowly ovate, inequilateral; beaks prominent, curved forwards, and situated at about the anterior third of the diameter. Sculptured with fifteen broadly rounded radial ribs with linear interspaces. The concentric growth lines do not cut the radials into beads; they are practically smooth. Hinge as in the Recent marshalli Marwick 1924, to which the species is probably ancestral.

The holotype of the species has a height of 5.75 mm (0.226 in), length of 5.1 mm (0.20 in) and a single valve thickness of 1.75 mm (0.069 in). It can be differentiated from P. marshalli due to having more numerous radial ribs, and interspaces that are narrower and almost linear.

== Taxonomy ==
The species was first described by A.W.B. Powell in 1938. In 2017, Damián E. Pérez and Claudia J. del Río recombined the species as Kolmeris murdochi, a change currently not accepted by the World Register of Marine Species. The holotype was collected at a date prior to 1939 by A. W. B. Powell, from lighthouse reef, Castlepoint, Wairarapa, New Zealand, and is held by the Auckland War Memorial Museum.

== Distribution ==
This extinct marine species occurs in Pleistocene (Nukumaruan stage) strata of New Zealand, dating to 2.40 million years before the present.
