= Mesalia mesal =

Scientific classification
- Kingdom: Animalia
- Phylum: Mollusca
- Class: Gastropoda
- Subclass: Caenogastropoda
- Order: incertae sedis
- Family: Turritellidae
- Genus: Mesalia
- Species: M. mesal

Binomial name
- Mesalia mesal (Deshayes, 1843)

Synonyms
- List: Mesalia freytagi Maltzan, 1884; Mesalia varia (Kiener, 1843); Turritella mesal Deshayes, 1843; Turritella varia Kiener, 1843

Species of gastropod

Mesalia mesal is a species of sea snail, a marine gastropod mollusk in the family Turritellidae.
