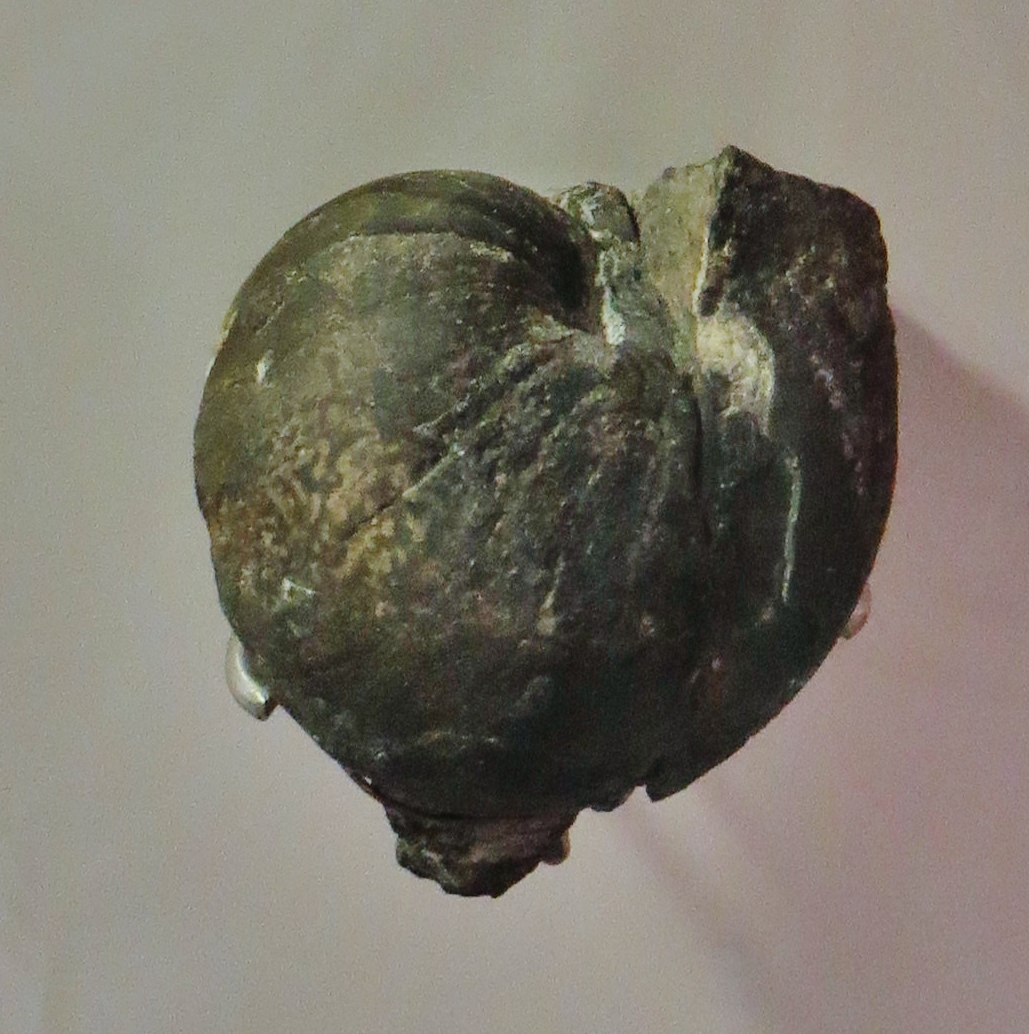

Scientific classification
- Domain: Eukaryota
- Kingdom: Animalia
- Phylum: Mollusca
- Class: Cephalopoda
- Subclass: Nautiloidea
- Order: Nautilida
- Family: †Liroceratidae
- Genus: †Peripetoceras; Hyatt, 1894

= Peripetoceras =

Peripetoceras Temporal range: L Carboniferous (Miss) - Permian

Extinct genus of nautiloids

Peripetoceras is a genus in the Clydonautilacean family, Liroceratidae. It can be recognized by its smooth, involute shell with a deep small umbilicus with rounded shoulders and steep convex wall; whorl section with flattened venter, rounded ventral shoulders and convergent slightly convex flanks; suture with slight ventral and lateral lobes; and small siphuncle located dorsally of the center.

Peripetoceras ranges from the Lower Carboniferous (Upper Mississippian) to the Permian and has been found in Europe (England and Germany), Russia and China.
