= Proclydonautilus =

Proclydonautilus Temporal range: Late Triassic

Scientific classification
- Domain: Eukaryota
- Kingdom: Animalia
- Phylum: Mollusca
- Class: Cephalopoda
- Subclass: Nautiloidea
- Order: Nautilida
- Family: †Clydonautilidae
- Genus: †Proclydonautilus; Mojsisovics, 1902

Extinct genus of molluscs

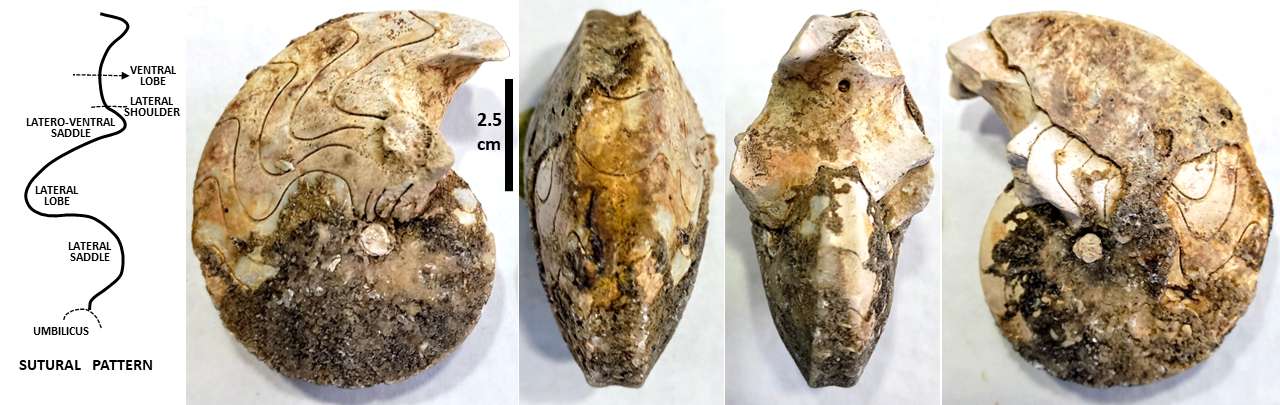
Proclydonautilus (Cosmonautilus) dilleri with the visible sutural pattern.

Proclydonautilus is a genus of nautiloids belonging to the Clydonautilidae known from the Upper Triassic of North America, Europe, and India.

The shell of Proclydonautilus, like those of other Clydonautilitidae, is involute and smooth. It is distinguished by its suture which has a broad, shallow to deep ventral lobe that divides a large ventral saddle. A large lateral lobe on the flans is followed by a small lateral saddle and a second lateral lobe.

With regard to the suture Proclydonautilus is most similar to Cosmonautilus and Callaionautilus, both also from the Late Triassic.
