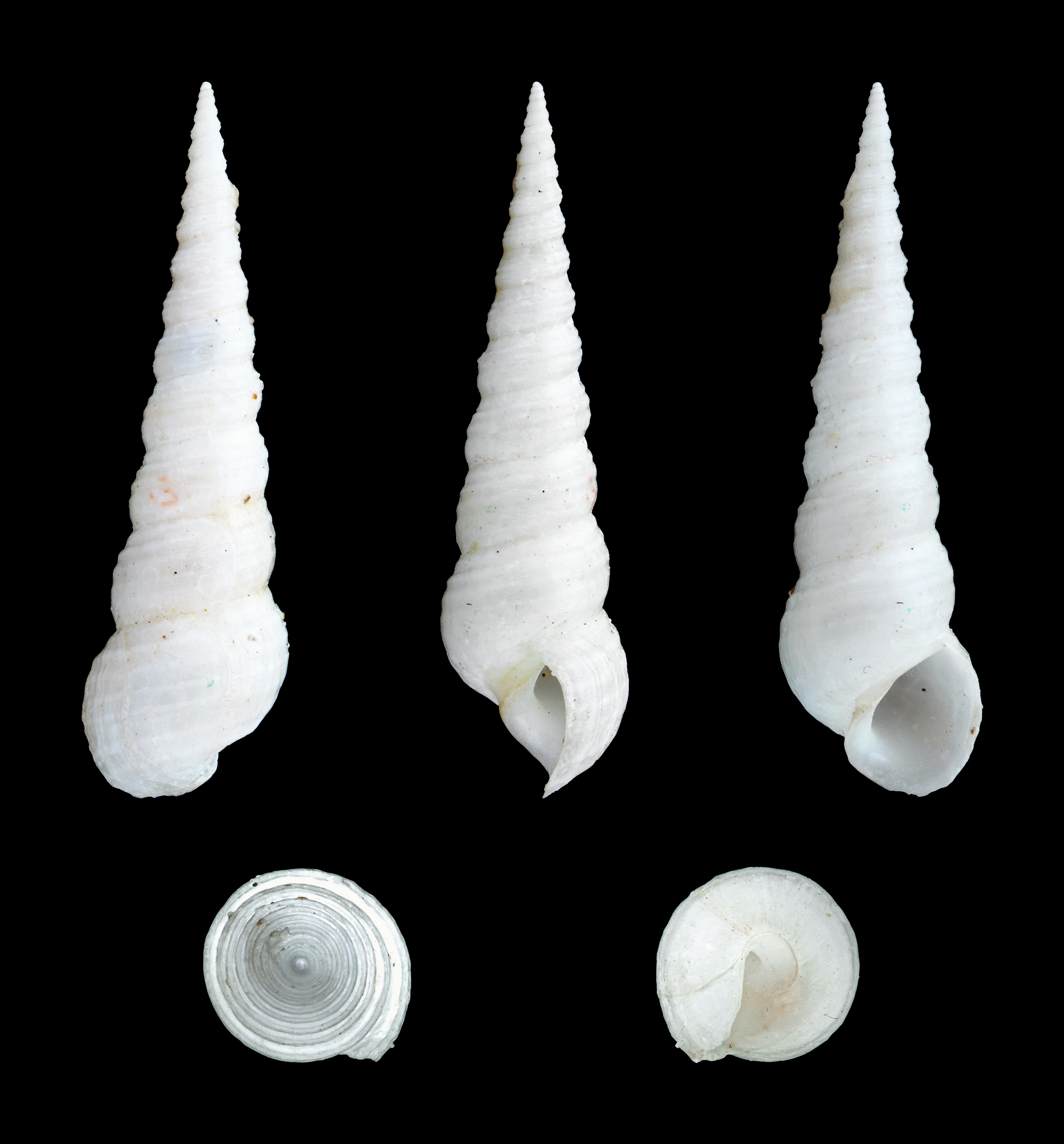
- Five views of a shell of Mesalia brevialis

Scientific classification
- Kingdom: Animalia
- Phylum: Mollusca
- Class: Gastropoda
- Subclass: Caenogastropoda
- Order: incertae sedis
- Family: Turritellidae
- Genus: Mesalia
- Species: M. brevialis

Binomial name
- Mesalia brevialis (Lamarck, 1822)

Synonyms
- Mesalia (Mesaliopsis) brevialis (Lamarck, 1822) (Alternate representation); Turritella (Mesalia) brevialis Lamarck, 1822 (Alternate representation); Turritella brevialis Lamarck, 1822

= Mesalia brevialis =

Species of gastropod

Mesalia brevialis is a species of sea snail, a marine gastropod mollusk in the family Turritellidae.
