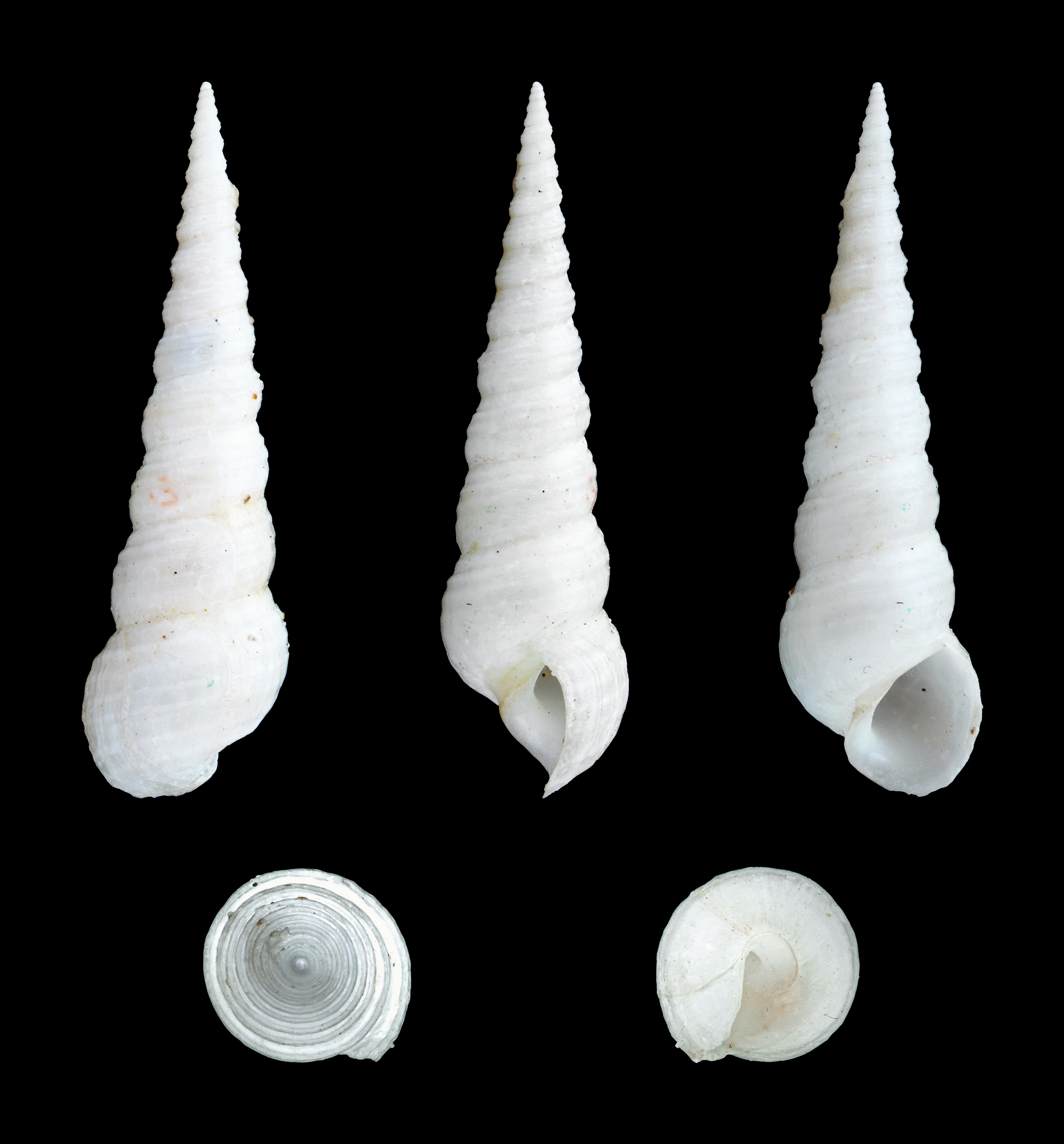
- Mesalia brevialis shell

Scientific classification
- Kingdom: Animalia
- Phylum: Mollusca
- Class: Gastropoda
- Subclass: Caenogastropoda
- Order: incertae sedis
- Family: Turritellidae
- Subfamily: Pareorinae
- Genus: Mesalia; Gray, 1847

Synonyms
- Mesalia (Mesalia) J. E. Gray, 1847

= Mesalia =

Genus of gastropods

Mesalia is a genus of sea snails, marine gastropod mollusks in the family Turritellidae.

== Species ==
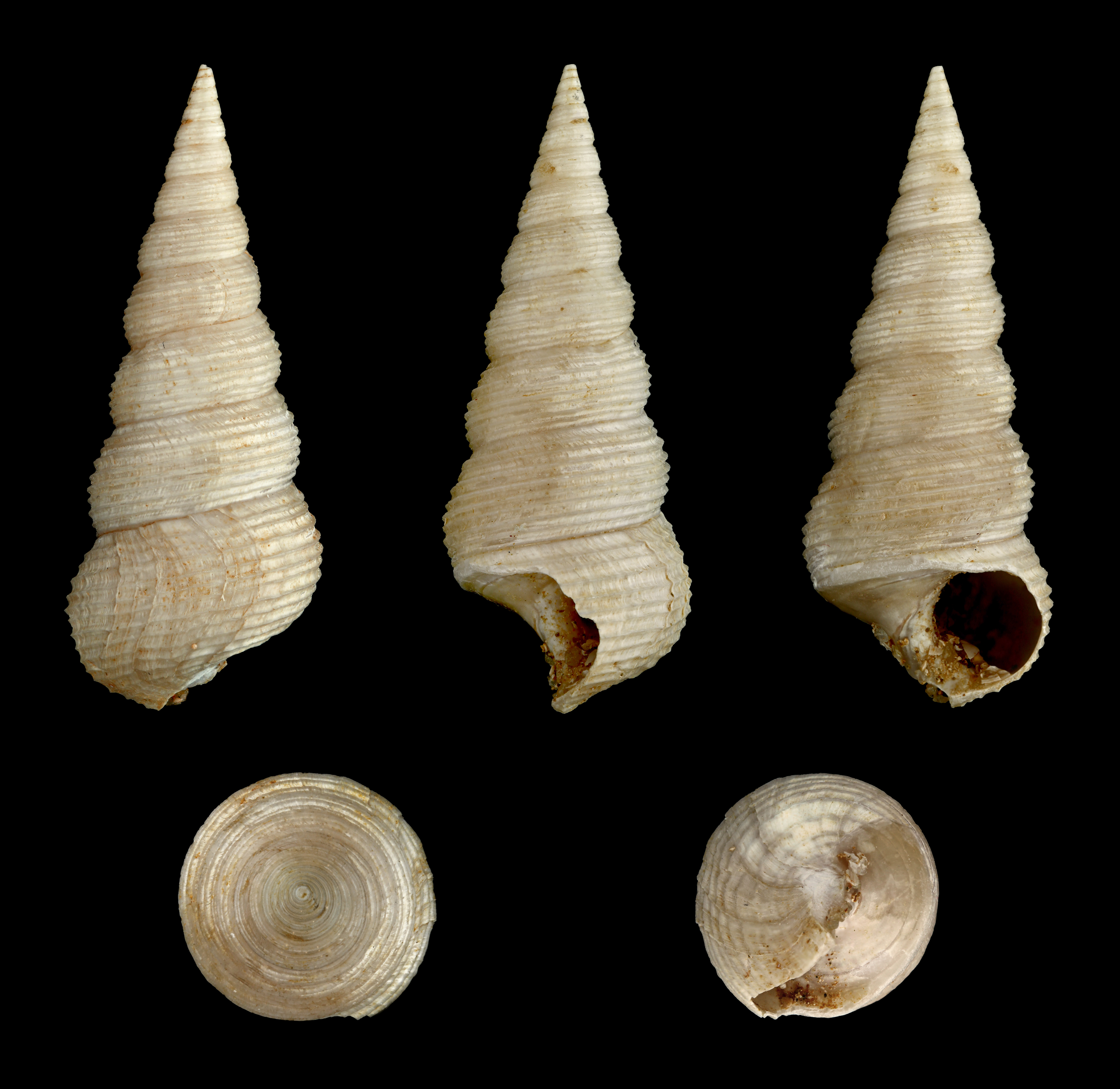
Mesalia multisulcata (Lamarck, 1804), a fossil species from the Eocene of France

Species within the genus Mesalia include:

- Mesalia brevialis (Lamarck, 1822)
- Mesalia flammifera (Locard, 1896)
- Mesalia freytagi Maltzan, 1844
- Mesalia lactea (Möller, 1842)
- Mesalia melanoides Reeve, 1849
- Mesalia mesal (Deshayes, 1843)
- Mesalia opalina (Adams & Reeve, 1850)
- Mesalia varia (Kiener, 1843)
- † Mesalia alabamiensis De Gregorio, 1890
- † Mesalia bassiounii Abbass, 1967
- † Mesalia claibornensis
- † Mesalia clarki Dickerson, 1914
- † Mesalia concava Abbass, 1967
- † Mesalia ferialae Abbass, 1967
- † Mesalia gigantia Awad & Abed, 1967
- † Mesalia goshourensis Matsubara & Ugai, 2006
- † Mesalia lincolnensis Weaver, 1916
- † Mesalia martinezensis Gabb, 1869
- † Mesalia minuta Abbass, 1967
- † Mesalia multisulcata (Lamarck, 1804)
- † Mesalia pagoda Cox, 1930
- † Mesalia paleocenica Awad & Abed, 1967
- † Mesalia pedinogyra Oppenheim, 1906
- † Mesalia pumila Gabb, 1860
- † Mesalia rathbuni Maury, 1934
- † Mesalia shatai Abbass, 1967
- † Mesalia tricarinata Abbass, 1967
- † Mesalia vetusta Conrad, 1833
- † Mesalia virginiae Stilwell et al., 2004
- † Mesalia zitteli Awad & Abed, 1967
