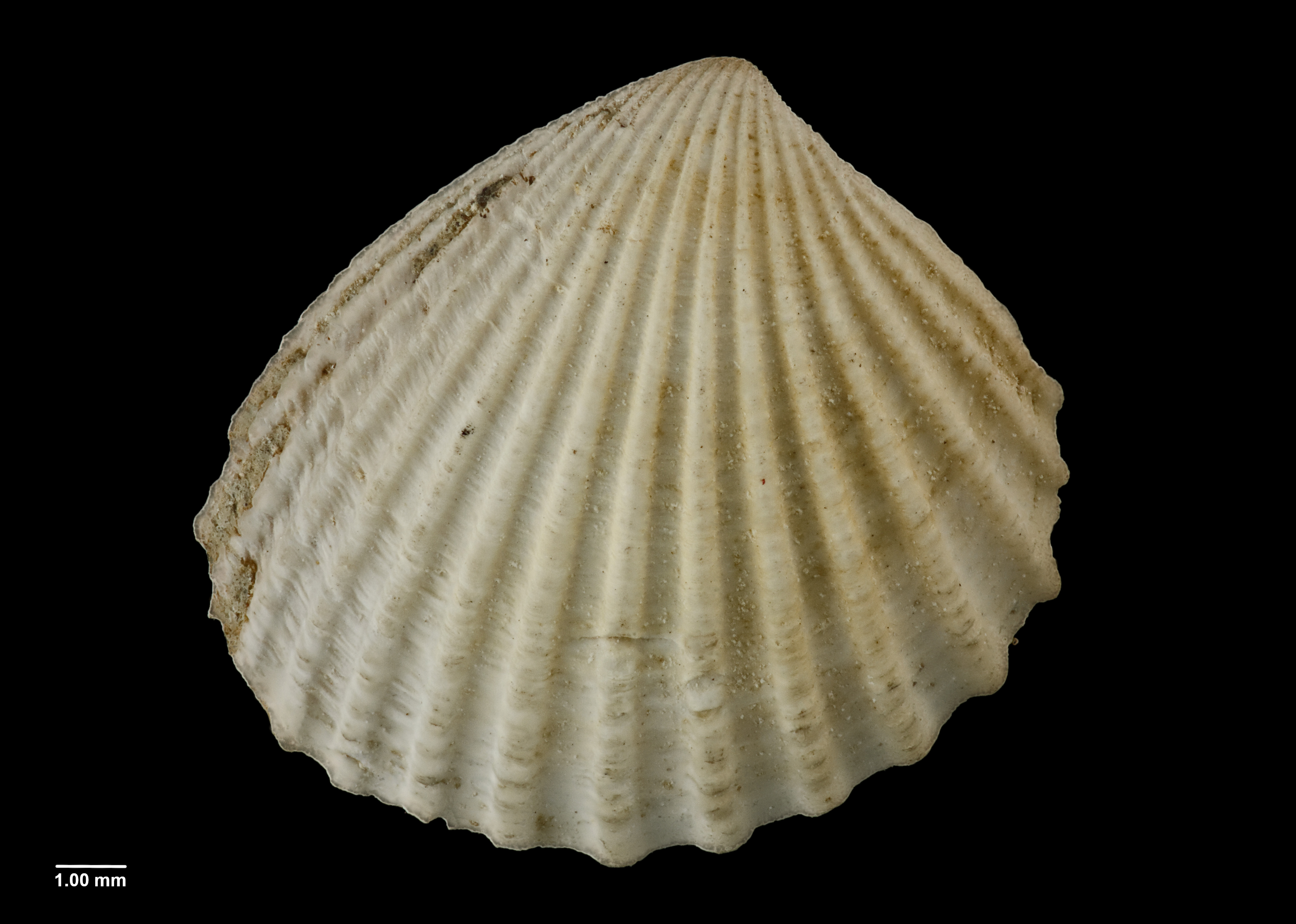
- Holotype from Auckland War Memorial Museum

Scientific classification
- Kingdom: Animalia
- Phylum: Mollusca
- Class: Bivalvia
- Order: Carditida
- Family: Carditidae
- Genus: Pleuromeris
- Species: †P. finlayi

Binomial name
- †Pleuromeris finlayi A. W. B. Powell, 1938

= Pleuromeris finlayi =

Pleuromeris finlayi Temporal range: 3.00–Recent Ma

Extinct species of gastropod

Pleuromeris finlayi is an extinct species of marine bivalve mollusc in the family Carditidae. Fossils of the species date to the Late Pliocene, Pleistocene and recent strata in New Zealand.

== Description ==
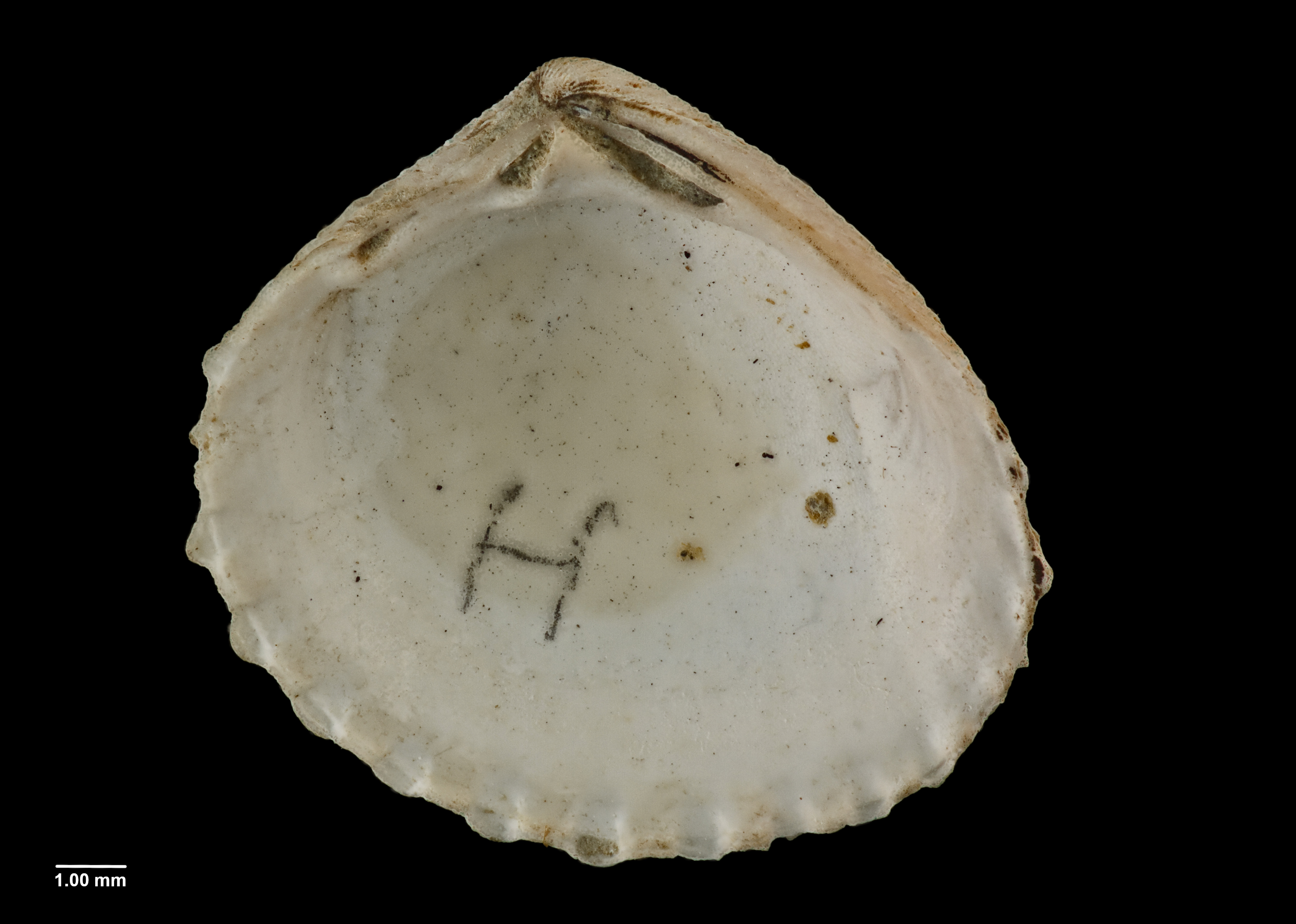
Reverse view of holotype

In the original description, Powell described the species as follows:

Shell of moderate size, obliquely subcircular, beaks prominent, curved forwards and situated at about the anterior fourth in adults (in juveniles, which are less oblique, at the anterior third). Sculptured with prominently raised rounded topped radial ribs with interspaces equalling the ribs, except towards the ventral margin, where they are slightly wider. Radials faintly beaded by regular concentric growth lines. Hinge similar to that of zelandica, except that the median cardinal of the right valve is more broadly triangular and the anterior cardinal of the left valve is narrower.

The holotype of the species has a height of 11.25 mm (0.443 in), length of 12.5 mm (0.49 in) and a single valve thickness of 3.5 mm (0.14 in). It can be differentiated from P. zelandica due to having more numerous radials (17 vs. 14), more oblique, having a broader median cardinal for the right valve and a narrower median cardinal on the left, and due to the shell being thinner.

== Taxonomy ==
The species was first described by A.W.B. Powell in 1938. The holotype was collected at a date prior to 1939 from Napier Port, Napier, New Zealand, and is held by the Auckland War Memorial Museum.

== Distribution ==
This extinct marine species occurs between Late Pliocene (Mangapanian stage) and recent strata of New Zealand, dating back to three million years before the present. Fossils have been found near Napier, and the South Taranaki Bight coast (Waitōtara, Nukumaru).
