= Gonionautilidae =

Gonionautilidae Temporal range: U Triassic (Nor)

Scientific classification
- Domain: Eukaryota
- Kingdom: Animalia
- Phylum: Mollusca
- Class: Cephalopoda
- Subclass: Nautiloidea
- Order: Nautilida
- Superfamily: †Clydonautiloidea
- Family: †Gonionautilidae; Kummel, 1950

Gonionautilidae is a family in the nautilid superfamily Clydonautiliaceae that contains only the genus Gonionautilus, known from the Upper Triassic (Norian) of Europe and North America. (Alps, state of Nevada)

Gonionautilus has a smooth, compressed involute shell with a narrow flattened venter and angular ventral shoulders. The suture resembles that of Clydonautilus, from which it must have been derived, except for the more highly developed median saddle and bifurcated dorsal lobe.

Gonionautilus (Gonionautilidae) is one of a number of advanced nautiloid cephalopods that developed sutures resembling those of some goniatites in the Ammonoidea.
