= Clydonautilidae =

Clydonautilidae Temporal range: M-U Triassic

Scientific classification
- Domain: Eukaryota
- Kingdom: Animalia
- Phylum: Mollusca
- Class: Cephalopoda
- Subclass: Nautiloidea
- Order: Nautilida
- Superfamily: †Clydonautiloidea
- Family: †Clydonautilidae; Hyatt, 1900

Extinct family of molluscs

The Clydonautilidae are Middle and Upper Triassic nautiloid cephalopods, which are derivatives of the clydonautiloidean family Liroceratidae, that have generally smooth, involute, globular to compressed shells, characterized by a suture with prominent lobes and saddles. The family is known to contain five genera, These are:

- Clydonautilus
- Callaionautilus
- Cosmonautilus
- Proclydonautilus
- Styrionautilus

Of these only Styrionautilus is known from the Middle Triassic. The other four are so far restricted to the Upper Triassic.

The five genera in the Clydonautilidae form a sequence of increasing sutural complexity, beginning with Styrionautilus and ending with Clydonautilus. Styrionautilis, which has the simplest suture of the five, has a broad ventral saddle with a flat bottom and a gently curved lateral lobe. Clydonauatilus at the opposite extreme has a secondary ventral saddle within the ventral lobe modifying the primary ventral saddle and a deep, asymmetric lateral lobe. Callaionautilus, Cosmonautilus, and Proclydonautulus fall in between.
