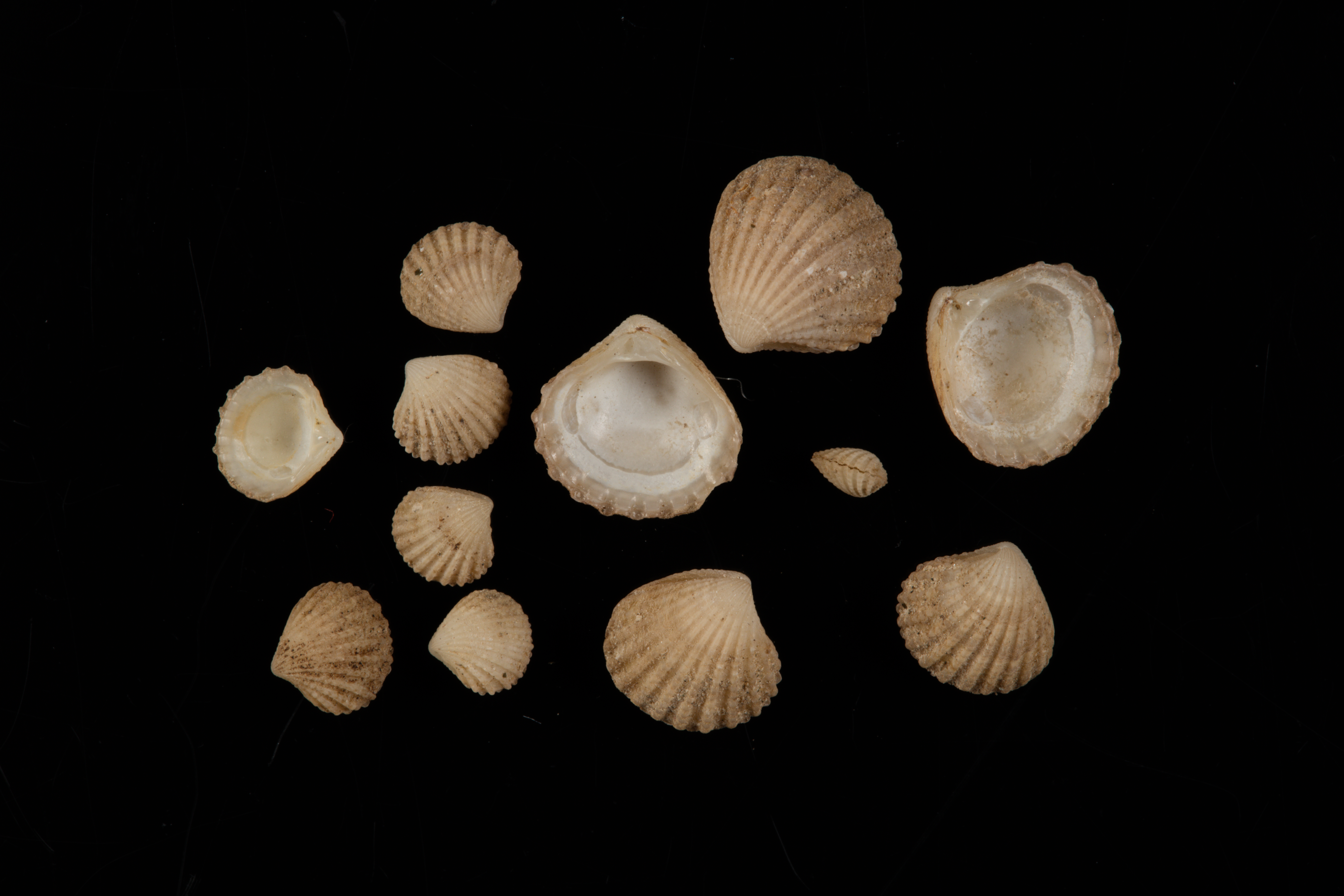
- Pleuromeris zelandica

Scientific classification
- Kingdom: Animalia
- Phylum: Mollusca
- Class: Bivalvia
- Order: Carditida
- Family: Carditidae
- Genus: Pleuromeris; Conrad, 1867

Type species
- Pleuromeris decemcostata Conrad, 1867

Synonyms
- Cardita (Pleuromeris) Conrad, 1867; Glans (Pleuromeris) Conrad, 1867; Venericardia (Pleuromeris) Conrad, 1867

= Pleuromeris =

Pleuromeris Temporal range: Paleocene–Recent

Genus of gastropods

Pleuromeris is a genus of bivalve molluscs in the family Carditidae.

== Description ==
Members of the genus have small subtrigonal shells with prominent beaks, and steep anterior and posterior slopes that constrict the hinge line laterally. A triangular central tooth is found on the right valve.

== Taxonomy ==
The genus was first described by Timothy Abbott Conrad in 1867.

== Distribution ==
Pleuromeris has a cosmopolitan distribution, found in areas including South America, the Caribbean Sea, Australia and New Zealand. The earliest known fossils date to the Paleocene, and are found in Belgium and New Zealand.

== Species ==
Species within the genus Pleuromeris include:

- †Pleuromeris archaenepeanensis (Chapman & Crespin, 1928)
- Pleuromeris armilla (Dall, 1903)
- †Pleuromeris auroraensis Ward & Blackwelder, 1987
- Pleuromeris benthicola A. W. B. Powell, 1937
- †Pleuromeris conradiana (Gabb, 1881)
- †Pleuromeris decemcostata Conrad, 1867
- †Pleuromeris finlayi A. W. B. Powell, 1938
- †Pleuromeris fueguina (Steinmann & Wilckens, 1908)
- Pleuromeris hectori A. W. B. Powell, 1938
- †Pleuromeris instata Laws, 1944
- †Pleuromeris kapuaensis (Marwick, 1931)
- †Pleuromeris koruahinensis (Bartrum & A. W. B. Powell, 1928)
- Pleuromeris latiuscula A. W. B. Powell, 1937
- Pleuromeris marshalli (Marwick, 1924)
- Pleuromeris micella Olsson & McGinty, 1958
- †Pleuromeris miniscula (Bartrum & A. W. B. Powell, 1928)
- †Pleuromeris moerdijki Vervoenen & van Nieulande, 2010
- †Pleuromeris murdochi A. W. B. Powell, 1938
- †Pleuromeris otamateaensis Laws, 1944
- Pleuromeris paucicostata Laws, 1940
- †Pleuromeris pecten (Tate, 1886)
- †Pleuromeris prolutea (Marwick, 1929)
- Pleuromeris pygmaea (Kuroda & Habe, 1951)
- Pleuromeris sanmartini Klappenbach, 1970
- †Pleuromeris scituloides (Olsson, 1914)
- †Pleuromeris subpecten Ludbrook, 1955
- †Pleuromeris sulcolunularis (Ihering, 1907)
- †Pleuromeris tellia (Dall, 1903)
- Pleuromeris tridentata (Say, 1826)
- †Pleuromeris trigonalis (Tate, 1886)
- Pleuromeris ultima Dell, 1956
- †Pleuromeris waitotarana Laws, 1940
- Pleuromeris zelandica (Deshayes, 1854)
