= Cosmonautilus =

Cosmonautilus Temporal range: Late Triassic

Scientific classification
- Kingdom: Animalia
- Phylum: Mollusca
- Class: Cephalopoda
- Subclass: Nautiloidea
- Order: Nautilida
- Family: †Clydonautilidae
- Genus: †Cosmonautilus; Hyatt and Smith 1905

Extinct genus of molluscs

Cosmonautilus is a genus of cephalopods included in the nautilid family Clydonautilidae. Its shell is involute, with only the outer whorl exposed. Early whorls are with nodes on ventral shoulder, which disappear on the later growth staged. Later whorls are smooth.

Cosmonautilus has been found in Siberian Russia, e.g. in eastern Taimyr and in the lower Lena River region, and in Alaska on Gravina Island, and California from Shasta County in the US, as well as Mexico, India, and Timor.

Callaionautilus and Clydonautilus are among related genera included in the Clydonautilidae.
