= Sinistrella =

Scientific classification
- Kingdom: Animalia
- Phylum: Mollusca
- Class: Gastropoda
- Subclass: Caenogastropoda
- Order: Neogastropoda
- Superfamily: Conoidea
- Family: incertae sedis
- Genus: Sinistrella; O.G. Meyer, 1887

Type species
- † Triforis americanus Aldrich, 1885

Genus of gastropods

Sinistrella is a genus of sea snails, marine gastropod mollusks unassigned in the superfamily Conoidea.

== Species ==
Species within the genus Sinistrella include:

- Sinistrella sinistralis (Petit de la Saussaye, 1839)
