= Clydonautiloidea =

Clydonautiloidea Temporal range: Late Devonian– Late Triassic

Scientific classification
- Domain: Eukaryota
- Kingdom: Animalia
- Phylum: Mollusca
- Class: Cephalopoda
- Subclass: Nautiloidea
- Order: Nautilida
- Superfamily: †Clydonautiloidea; Hyatt in Zittel 1900

Families
- See text

Synonyms
- Clydonautilaceae

Extinct superfamily of molluscs

The Clydonautiloidea are a superfamily within the nautiloid order Nautilida characterized by smooth, generally globular, shells with nearly straight sutures, in early forms, but developing highly differentiated sutures in some later forms. Where known, the siphuncle tends to be central to subcentral.

The Clydonautiloidea, name based on Hyatt's Clydonautilidae of 1900, are more or less the Liroceratina of Shimansky 1962.

== Classification and taxonomy ==
The Clydonautiloidea, which began in the Late Devonian, combine five families, three of which are restricted to the Triassic. Principal and forming the root stock are the Late Devonian to Upper Triassic Liroceratidae, from which Shimankiy derived his suborder. Derived from the Liroceratidae in the Early Mississippian are this Mississippian to mid Permian Ephippioceratidae. The three Triassic families, derived from Triassic liroceratids, are the Clydonautilidae, Gonionautilidae, and Siberonautilidae, all with prominent lobes and saddles in the suture.

The families are described as:

The Clydonautilidae, named by Hyatt in 1900, were the first to be defined and provide the name for the superfamily. Clydonautilids are characterized by generally smooth, involute, globular to compressed shells with a very small to occluded (hidden) umbilicus and sutures with prominent lobes and saddles. Their range is from the mid to Upper Triassic.

The Liroceratidae, named by Miller and Youngquist in 1949, are the ancestral family, which gave rise to the other four, and which has the longest duration, from the Upper Devonian to the Upper Triassic. The Liroceratidae are characterized by generally smooth shells with broadly rounded, depressed whorls, occluded umbilicus, slightly sinuous sutures, and a siphuncle that is usually more or less central.

The Ephippioceratidae, named by Miller and Youngquist in 1949, which have a range from the Lower Carboniferous (Miss) to the Lower Permian, are closely similar to the Liroceratidae, but have deep ventral and dorsal saddles in the suture.

The Gonionautilidae, named by Kummel in 1950 to contain the Upper Triassic genus Gonionautilus, have a smooth, involute, compressed shell with narrow flattened venter and a suture like that of Clydonautilus, but with a more highly developed median saddle and double-pointed annular lobes.

The Siberionautilidae, named by Popov in 1951 for the Upper Triassic Siberionautilus, have an involute, finely ribbed, globular shell with flattened flanks that converge toward a rounded venter and a highly differentiated goniatitic suture.

== Origin and extinction ==
The origin of the Clydonautiloidea (Liroceratidae) is unknown for sure, but is generally surmised as being from the Rutoceratidae, late in the Devonian.

The Liroceratidae were the only clydonautilaceans living at the end of the Permian, when a significant number of nautilid genera perished, but enough survived to carry the family, and by inference the superfamily into the Triassic. Already reduced in number, although suddenly diverse, none of the Clydonautiloidea escaped the smaller extinction at the end of the Triassic.
