= Liroceratidae =

Liroceratidae Temporal range: Mississippian (L Carb) - Triassic

Scientific classification
- Domain: Eukaryota
- Kingdom: Animalia
- Phylum: Mollusca
- Class: Cephalopoda
- Subclass: Nautiloidea
- Order: Nautilida
- Superfamily: †Clydonautiloidea
- Family: †Liroceratidae; Miller & Youngquist, 1949

Extinct family of nautiloids

Liroceratidae is an extinct family of nautilids, shelled marine molluscs, belonging to the Clydonautiloidea, consisting of generally smooth, involute, nautiliconic forms with a small umbilicus. The whorl section is usually depressed and broadly rounded, the suture only slightly sinuous, and the siphuncle usually more or less central.

The Liroceratidae range from the Mississippian well into the Triassic and may even extend down into the upper Devonian.

The Liroceratidae are probably derived from the Rutoceratidae and form the root stock of the Clydonautiloidea. They also provide the basis for the name for Shimankiy's Lirocerina, a suborder mostly equivalent to the Clydonautilaceae. The Liroceratidae gave rise to the Ephippioceratidae early in the Mississippian, which extend well into the Permian, and to the Clydonautilidae, Gonionautilidae, and Siberionautilidae in the Triassic.
