= Clydonautilus =

Clydonautilus Temporal range: Late Triassic

Scientific classification
- Domain: Eukaryota
- Kingdom: Animalia
- Phylum: Mollusca
- Class: Cephalopoda
- Subclass: Nautiloidea
- Order: Nautilida
- Family: †Clydonautilidae
- Genus: †Clydonautilus; Mojsisovics 1882

Extinct genus of molluscs

Clydonautilus is a genus of nautiloids and type for the Clydonautilidae that has been found in the Upper Triassic of Europe, India, and Timor. Its type is C. noricus.

Clydonautilus is the most derived of the Clydonautilitidae, evidenced in its suture. The shell itself is smooth and involute, with only the outer whorl exposed. The diagnostic suture has a small median saddle in the ventral lobe which in turn has a smaller shallow lobe. Those in other clydonautilitids are less complex.
