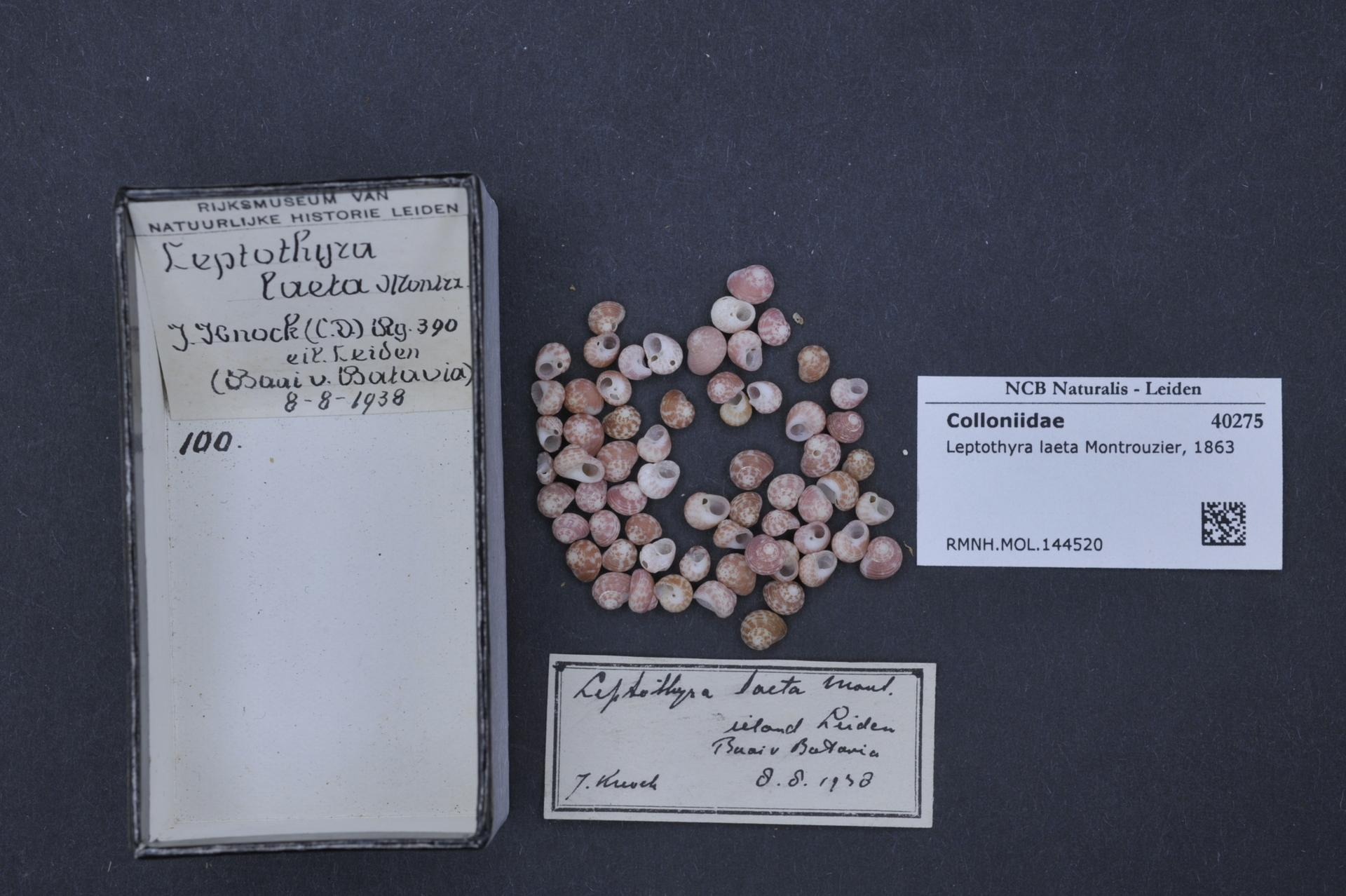
- Collonia granulosa shells

Scientific classification
- Kingdom: Animalia
- Phylum: Mollusca
- Class: Gastropoda
- Subclass: Vetigastropoda
- Order: Trochida
- Superfamily: Trochoidea
- Family: Colloniidae
- Subfamily: Colloniinae
- Genus: Collonia; Gray, 1850

Synonyms
- Turbo (Collonia)

= Collonia =

Genus of gastropods

Collonia is a genus of small sea snails with calcareous opercula, marine gastropod mollusks in the family Colloniidae.

== Species ==
Species within the genus Collonia include:

- Collonia admissa (E. A. Smith, 1890)
- Collonia donghaiensis Dong, 1982
- Collonia granulosa Pease, 1868
- Collonia incerta (E. A. Smith, 1890)

The following species were brought into synonymy

- Collonia gestroi Caramagna, 1888: synonym of Yaronia gestroi (Caramagna, 1888)
- Collonia maculosa Pease, 1868: synonym of Homalopoma maculosa (Pease, 1868)
- Collonia munda H. Adams, 1873: synonym of Bothropoma mundum (H. Adams, 1873)
- Collonia purpurescens Dunker, 1882: synonym of Homalopoma amussitatum (Gould, 1861)
- Collonia quantilla Gould, 1861: synonym of Homalopoma quantillum (Gould, 1861)
- Collonia rosa Pilsbry, 1904: synonym of Neocollonia pilula rosa (Pilsbry, 1904)
