= L. laeta =

L. laeta may refer to:

- Lambdina laeta, a geometer moth
- Leptothyra laeta, a sea snail
- Leunisia laeta, a plant with a pseudanthium
- Liloa laeta, a haminoeid bubble snail
- Loxosceles laeta, a recluse spider
- Lycosa laeta, a wolf spider
