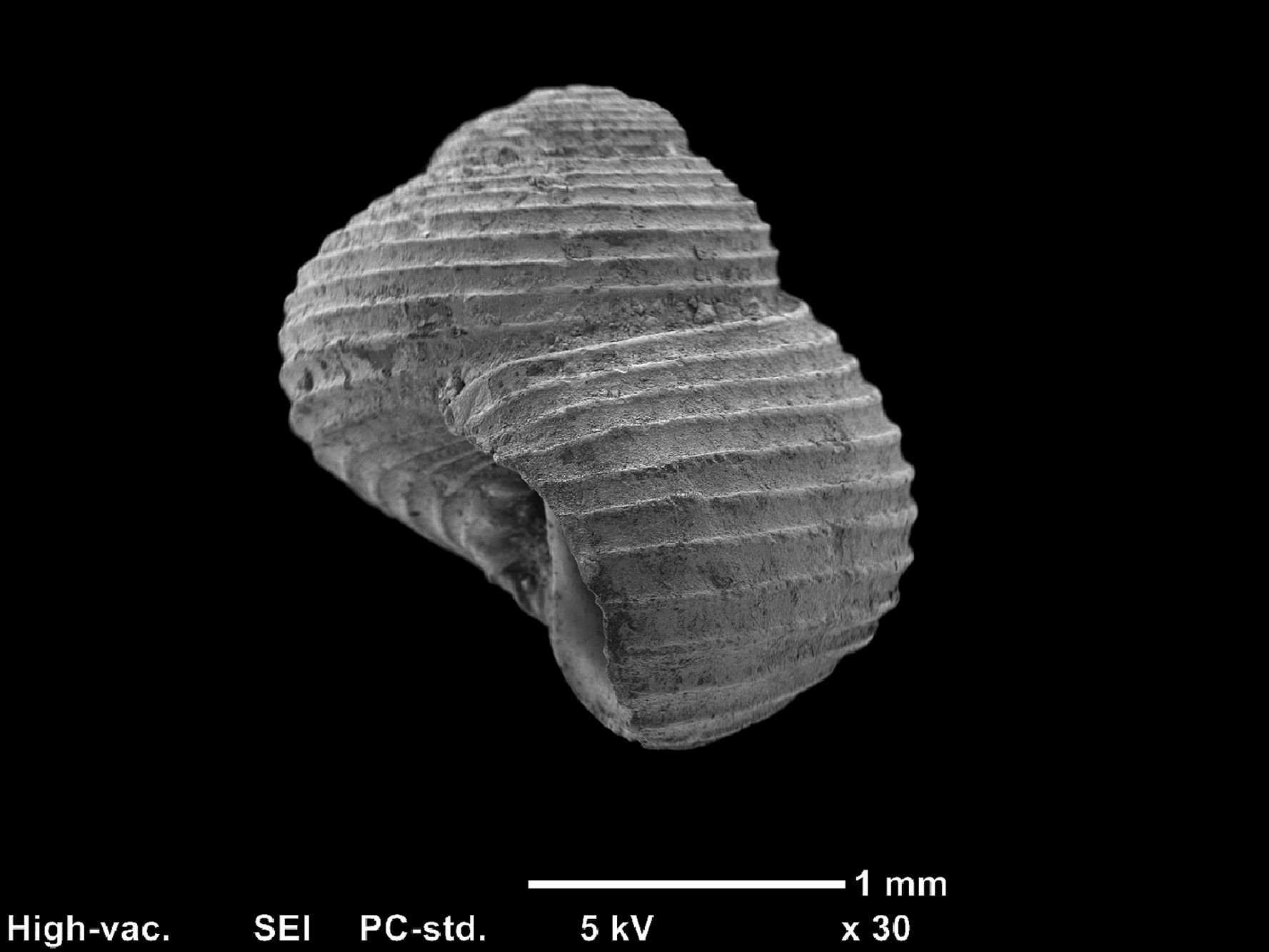
- Cirsochilus moucharti

Scientific classification
- Kingdom: Animalia
- Phylum: Mollusca
- Class: Gastropoda
- Subclass: Vetigastropoda
- Order: Trochida
- Family: Colloniidae
- Subfamily: Colloniinae
- Genus: †Cirsochilus; Cossmann, 1888

Type species
- † Cirsochilus varius (Defrance, 1818)

Synonyms
- Collonia (Cirsochilus) Cossmann, 1888; Cirsochilus (Tipua) Marwick, 1943; Collonia (Cirsochilus) Cossmann, 1888; Tipua Marwick, 1943

= Cirsochilus =

Cirsochilus Temporal range: Cretaceous–Quaternary

Genus of gastropods

Cirsochilus is an extinct genus of sea snails, marine gastropod molluscs in the family Colloniidae. Fossils of the genus date to between the Cretaceous and the Quaternary periods, and are found globally.

== Description ==
Members of the genus have a thickened inner lip, sharp edge, and a pearly shell.

== Taxonomy ==
Cirsochilus was first described by Maurice Cossmann in 1888 as a subgenus of Collonia. It was raised to genus level by Jean-Michel Pacaud and Jacques Le Renard in 1995.

== Distribution ==
Fossils of the genus date to between the Cretaceous period and Quaternary period, and have been found in the Americas, Europe, Asia and Oceania.

== Species ==
Species within the genus Cirsochilus include:

- † Cirsochilus caillati (Deshayes, 1863)
- † Cirsochilus defectus (Pezant, 1908)
- † Cirsochilus disjunctus (Deshayes, 1863)
- † Cirsochilus grignonensis (Deshayes, 1863)
- † Cirsochilus jucundus (Deshayes, 1863)
- † Cirsochilus lamarckii (A. d'Orbigny, 1850)
- † Cirsochilus macrostoma (Deshayes, 1863)
- † Cirsochilus moucharti Pacaud & Merle, 2017
- † Cirsochilus obsoletus (Cossmann, 1888)
- † Cirsochilus pilulatus Darragh, 1997
- † Cirsochilus priscus (A. W. B. Powell, 1935)
- † Cirsochilus ryukyuensis MacNeil, 1961
- † Cirsochilus semperi (Deshayes, 1863)
- † Cirsochilus tricarinatus (Laws, 1939)
- † Cirsochilus tricincta (P. Marshall, 1919)
- † Cirsochilus varius (Defrance, 1818)

== Gallery ==
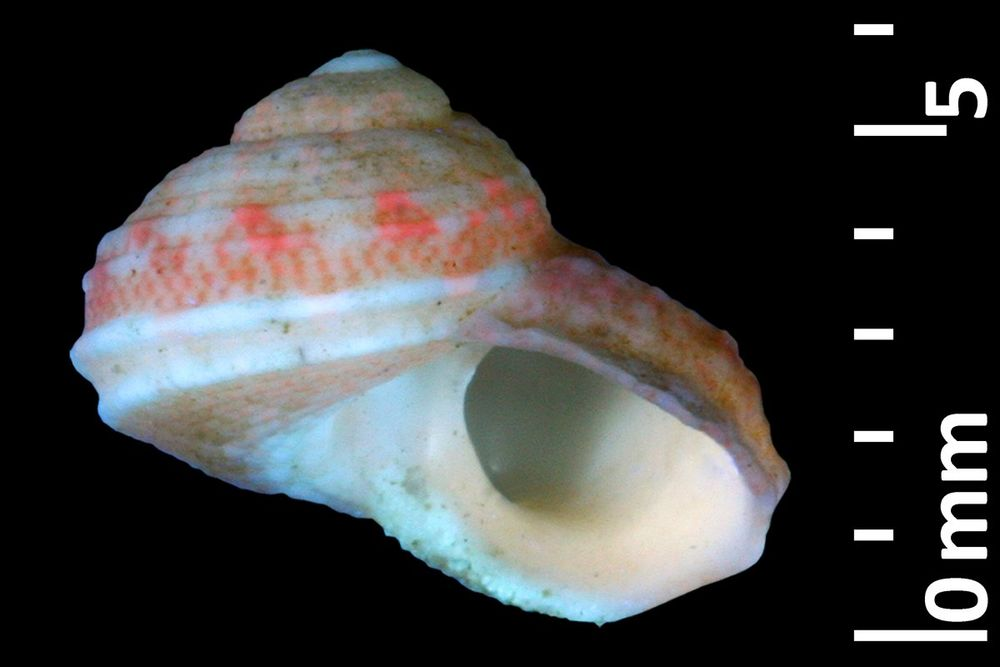
Cirsochilus lamarckii

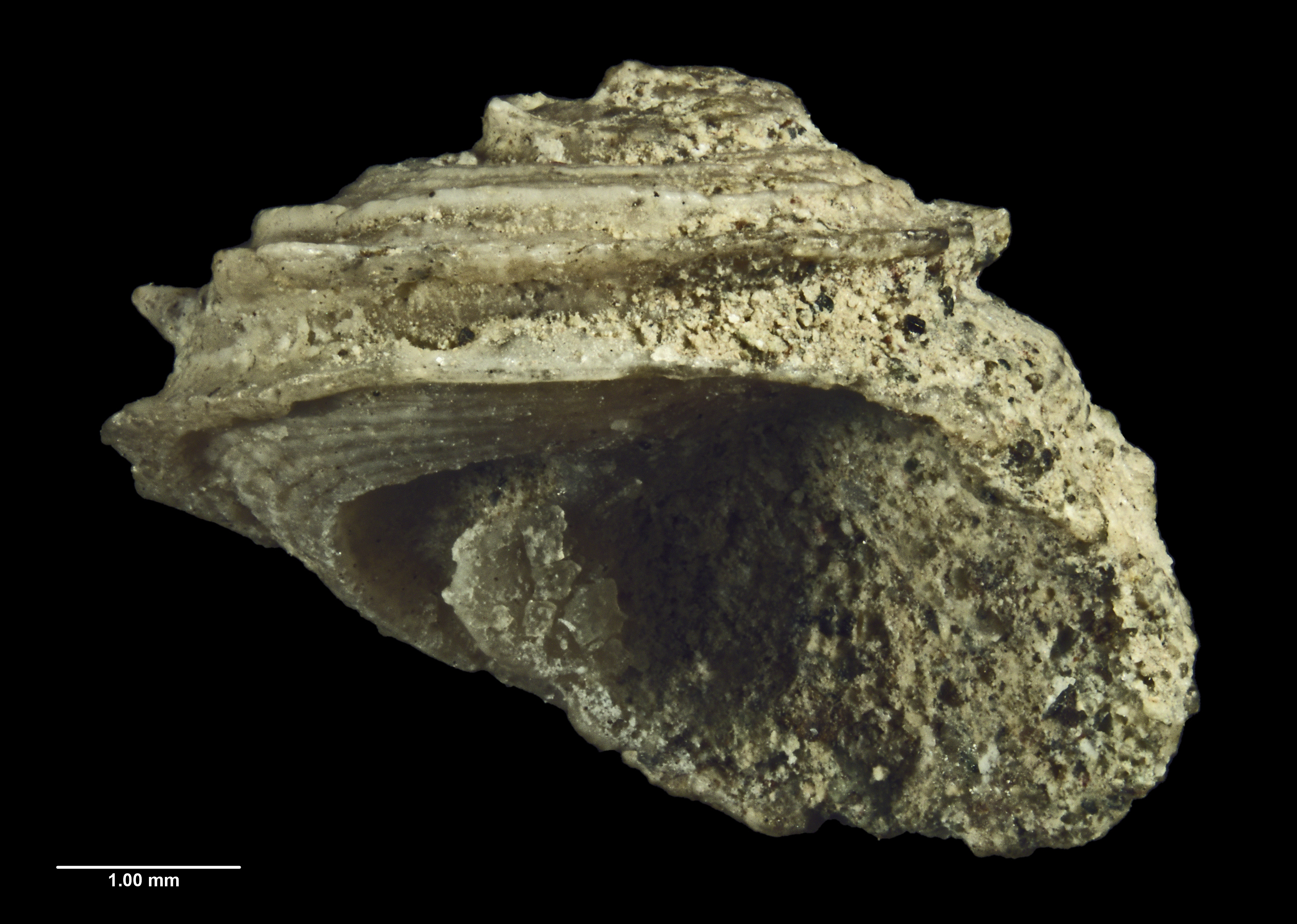
Cirsochilus priscus
