= Mid-Holocene hemlock decline =

Decrease of the conifer species

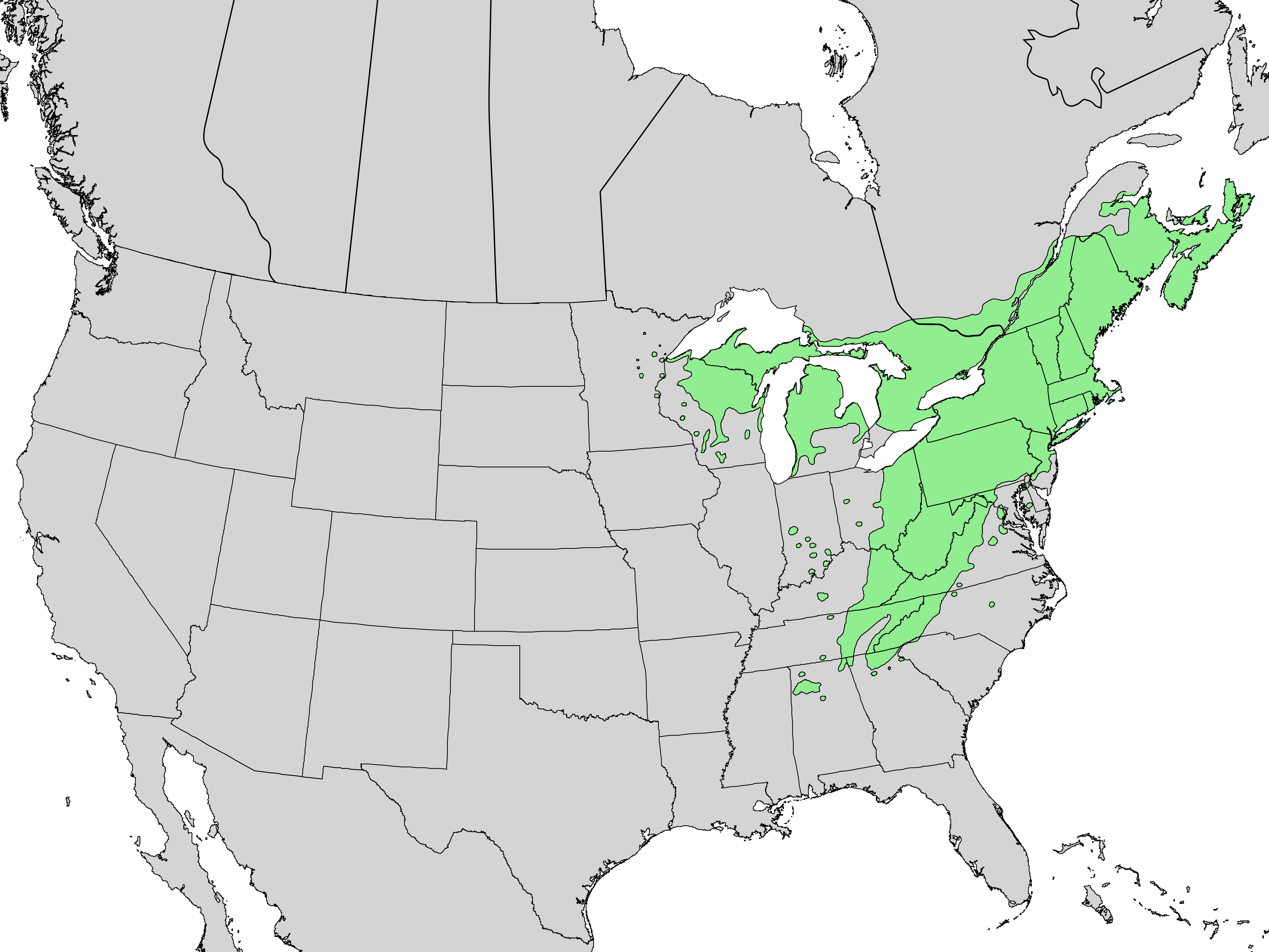
Modern range of Tsuga canadensis

The mid-Holocene hemlock decline was an abrupt decrease in Eastern Hemlock (Tsuga canadensis) populations noticeable in fossil pollen records across the tree's range. It has been estimated to have occurred approximately 5,500 calibrated radiocarbon years before 1950 AD. The decline has been linked to insect activity and to climate factors. Post-decline pollen records indicate changes in other tree species' populations after the event and an eventual recovery of hemlock populations over a period of about 1000–2000 years at some sites.

== Causes ==
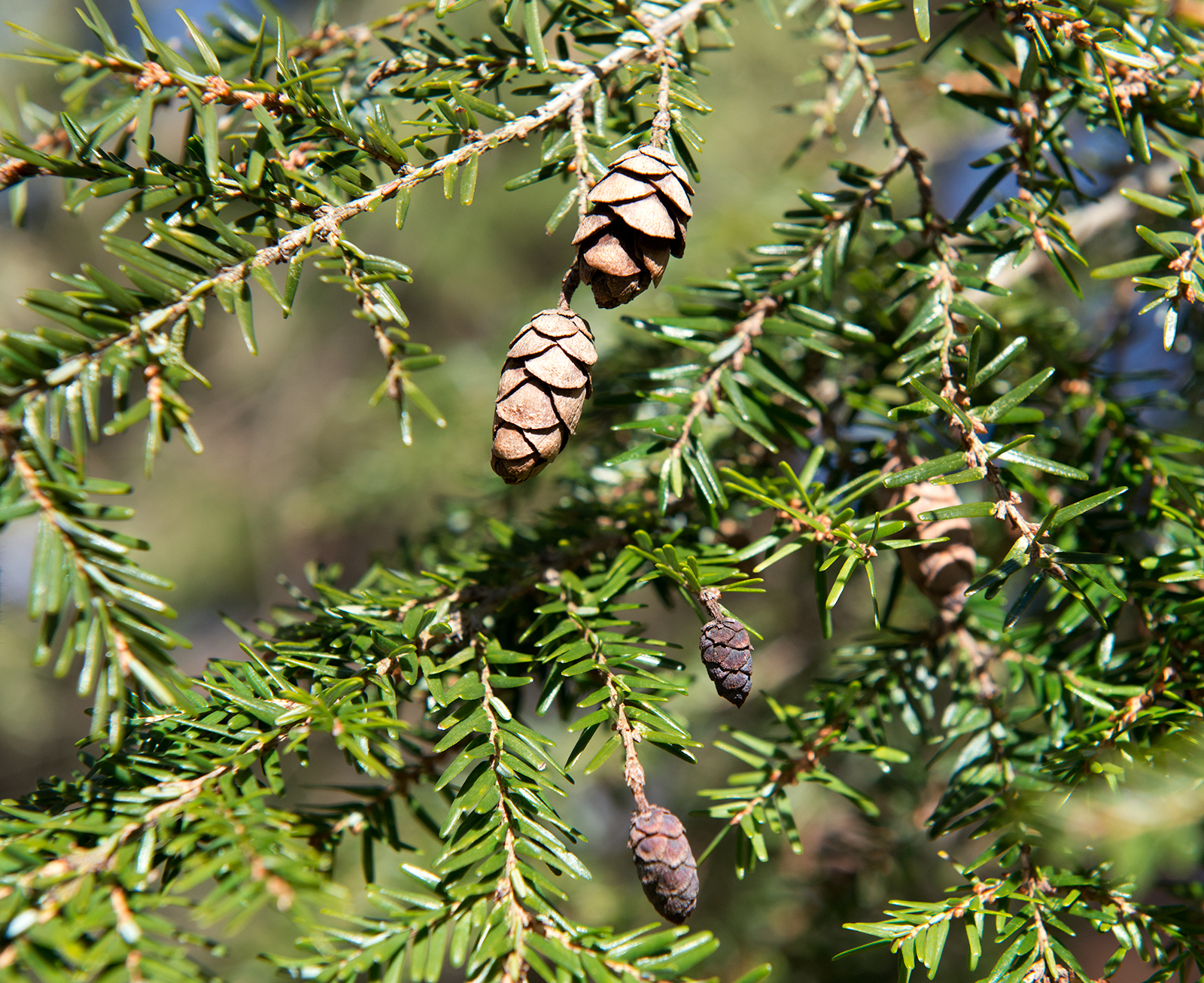
Tsuga canadensis needles and cones

Some relatively earlier studies on this event link it to insect outbreaks (e.g. hemlock looper), while more recent research has argued for climate changes as the driving factors in this decline. Evidence used to point towards an insect outbreak includes sudden nature of the event and the debated assertion that similar trends were not shown in other species. Fossil evidence used to support the insect pathogen argument include the presence of fossil hemlock looper and spruce budworm head capsules, and more prevalent than normal macrofossil hemlock needles with evidence of feeding by the hemlock looper. Arguments for climate changes as the driving factor of this event include linking the decline in hemlock fossil pollen to trends from other tree species and to lake-level reconstructions from sediment cores and ground-penetrating radar that indicate a change to drier conditions. These climate changes may have been associated with shifts in atmospheric and ocean circulation. While its causes have been debated, this event may be used to provide insight into how modern forests may respond to pathogen outbreaks or to anthropogenic climate change.

== Post-decline dynamics ==
Increases in the fossil pollen of other tree species such as birch have been found at some sites following the decline in hemlock pollen. In some areas, hemlock fossil pollen indicates a recovery of the population that took place over the period from about 1000-2000 years after the decline, while in other areas, fossil pollen indicates that the hemlock population never fully recovered or that forest composition was forever altered following the event. A continuation of drought conditions may have delayed hemlock recovery in some areas.
