= Yaronia =

Scientific classification
- Kingdom: Animalia
- Phylum: Mollusca
- Class: Gastropoda
- Subclass: Vetigastropoda
- Order: Trochida
- Superfamily: Trochoidea
- Family: Colloniidae
- Genus: Yaronia; Mienis, 2011

Genus of gastropods

Yaronia is a genus of sea snails, marine gastropod mollusks in the subfamily Denticallosiinae of the family Colloniidae, the turban snails.

== Species ==
Species within the genus Yaronia include:

- Yaronia gestroi (Caramagna, 1888)
- Yaronia pustulata (Brocchi, 1821)

Synonyms

- Yaronia albobrunnea (Bozzetti, 2014): synonym of Denticallosia albobrunnea (Bozzetti, 2014) (superseded combination)

Taxon inquirendum

- Yaronia pyropus (Reeve, 1848)
