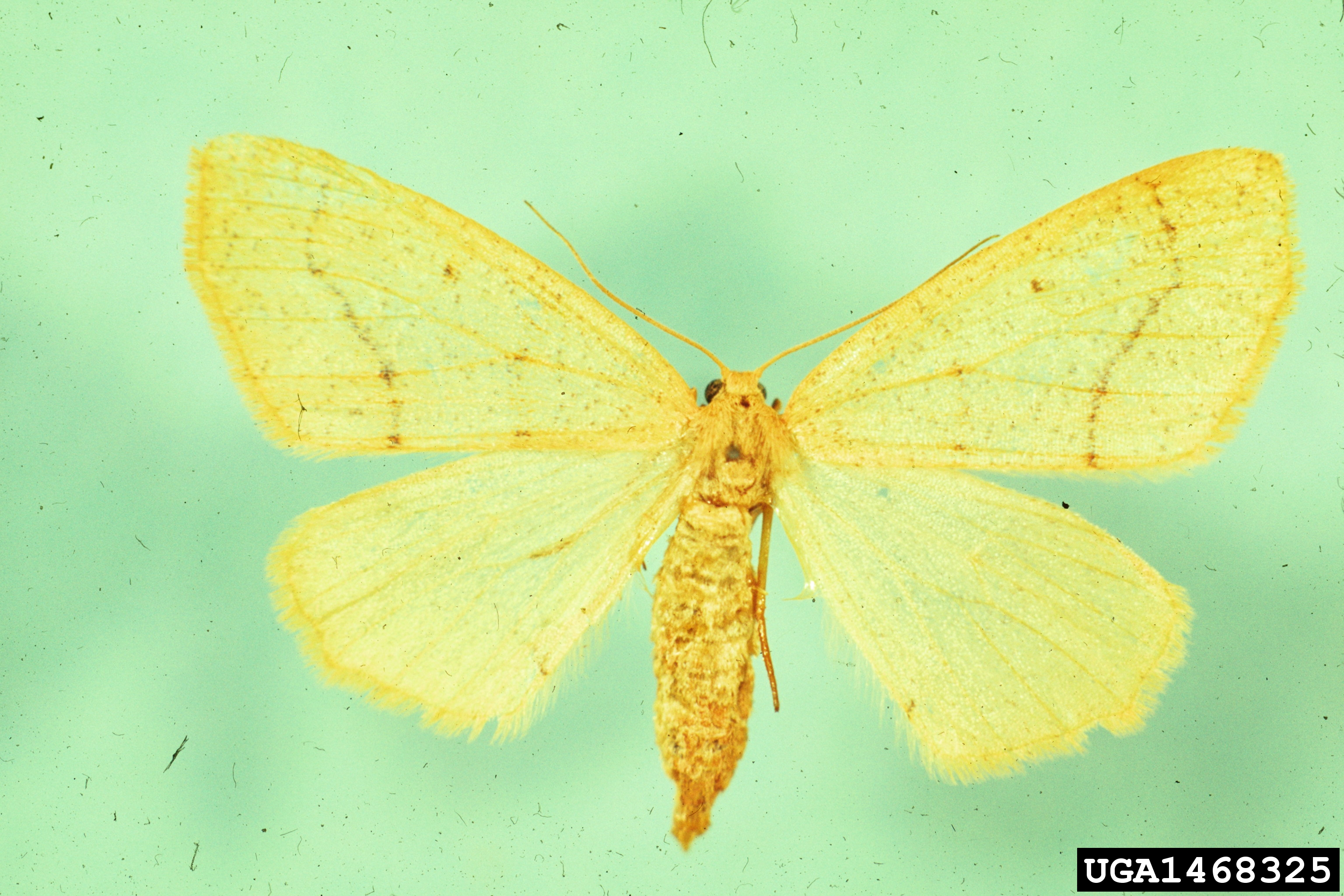

Scientific classification
- Kingdom: Animalia
- Phylum: Arthropoda
- Class: Insecta
- Order: Lepidoptera
- Family: Geometridae
- Genus: Lambdina
- Species: L. vitraria

Binomial name
- Lambdina vitraria Grote, 1883

Synonyms
- Lambdina punctata; Lambdina jacularia

= Lambdina vitraria =

Species of moth

Lambdina vitraria is a moth of the family Geometridae. It is found in North America, including Arizona and Utah.

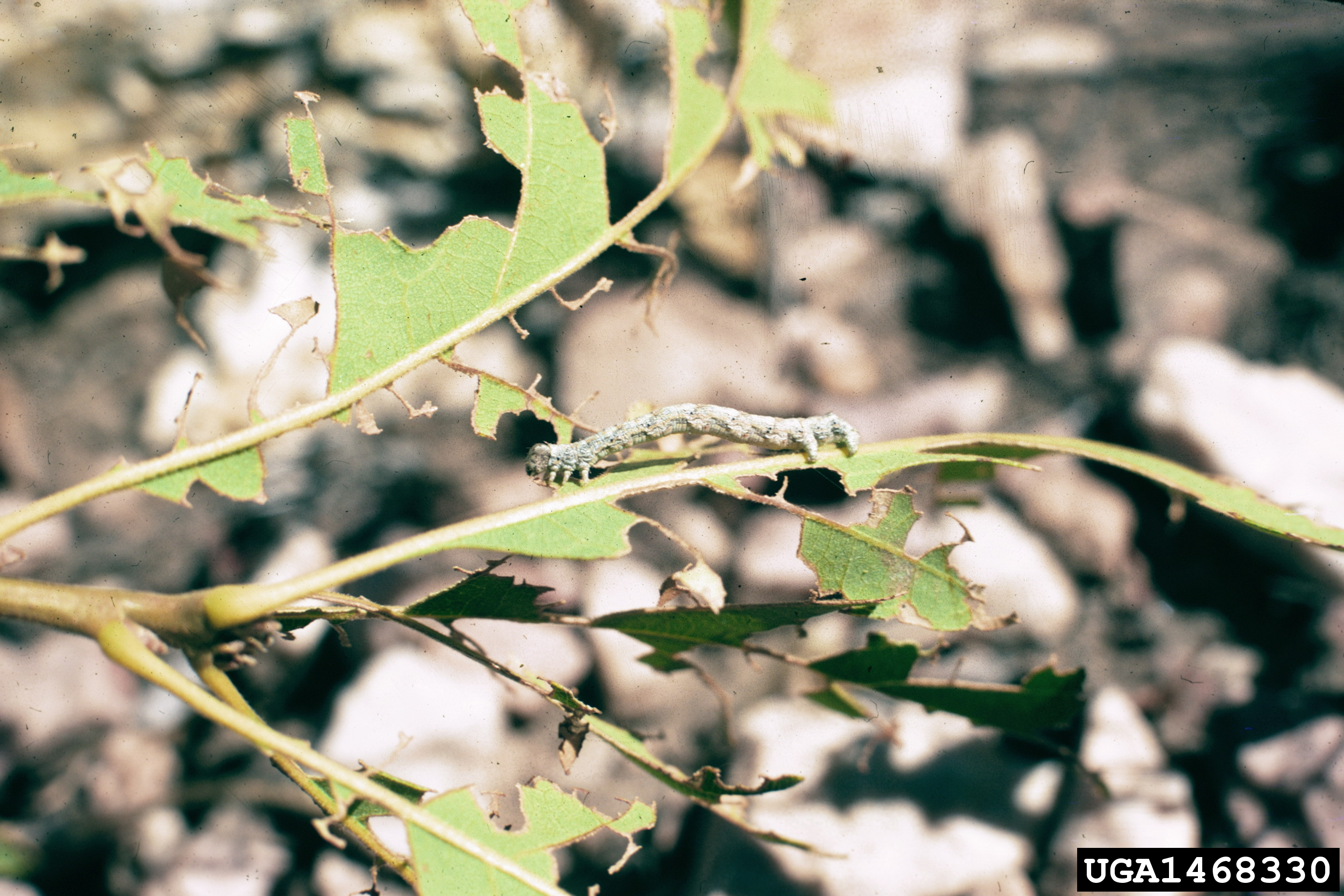
Caterpillar

The larva feeds on Quercus species, including Quercus gambelii.
