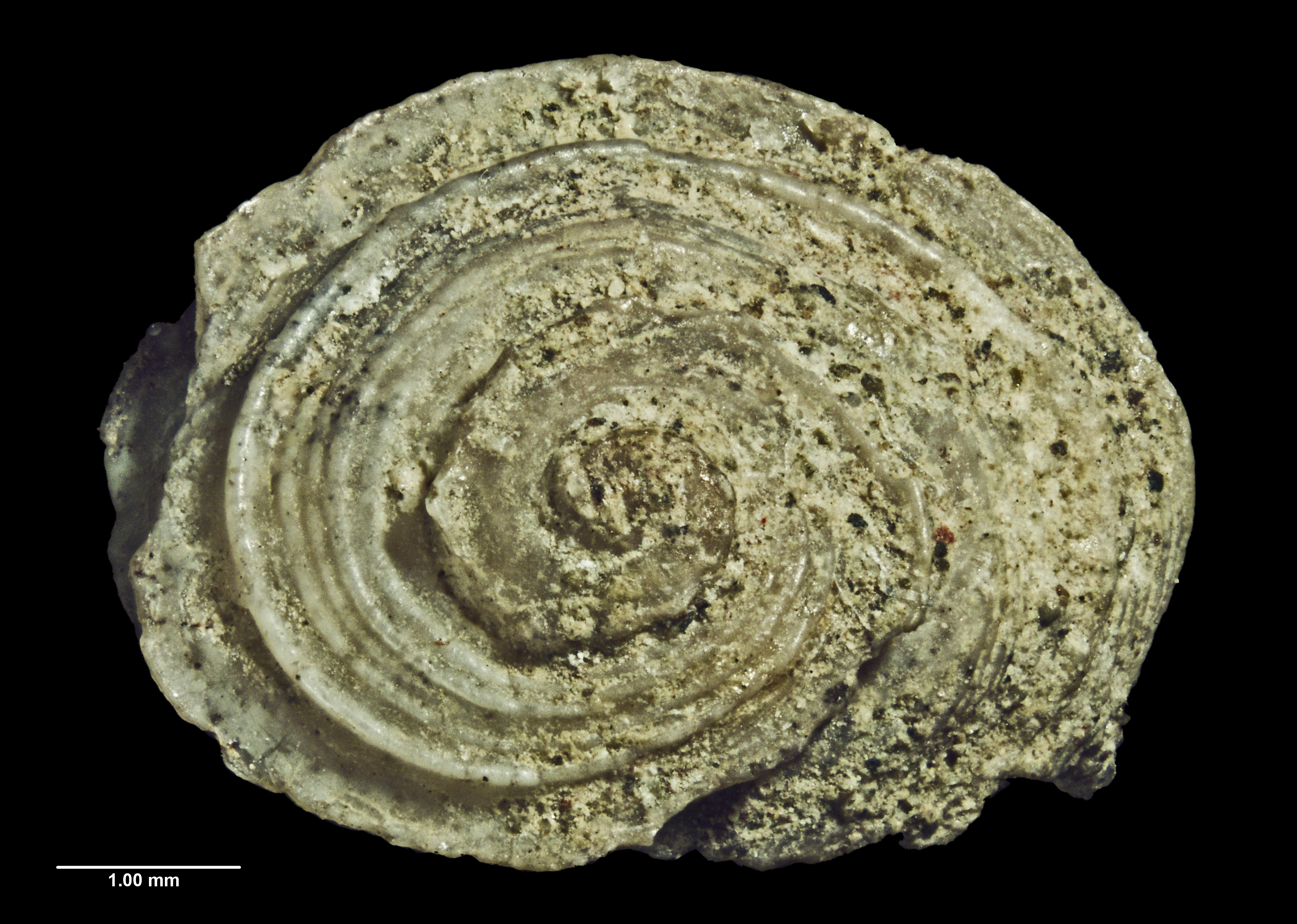
- Holotype from Auckland War Memorial Museum

Scientific classification
- Kingdom: Animalia
- Phylum: Mollusca
- Class: Gastropoda
- Subclass: Vetigastropoda
- Order: Trochida
- Family: Colloniidae
- Genus: †Cirsochilus
- Species: †C. priscus

Binomial name
- †Cirsochilus priscus A. W. B. Powell, 1935

Synonyms
- Cirsochilus (Cirsochilus) priscus (A. W. B. Powell, 1935); Risellopsis prisca A. W. B. Powell, 1935

= Cirsochilus priscus =

Cirsochilus priscus Temporal range: early Miocene

Extinct species of gastropod

Cirsochilus priscus is an extinct species of sea snail, a marine gastropod mollusc, in the family Colloniidae. Fossils of the species date to early Miocene strata of the west coast of the Auckland Region.

== Description ==
In the original description, Powell described the species as follows:

Shell small, solid, depressed trochiform, perforate, spirally striated and prominently keeled. Whorls 4 1/2, including a typical almost flat protoconch of 2 1/2 smooth whorls. Spire-whorls with two strong cords, which later, with the addition of another strong cord from beneath the lower suture, develop into the three strong peripheral keels so characteristic of the Recent genotype. In addition, the surface, both above and below, is sculptured with fine spiral threads; about five above and three below the upper keel of the first post-nuclear whorl, and increasing to about double this number at the termination of the last whorl. On the base there is a strong spiral ridge almost the strength of one of the keels. This is situated midway across the base and defines the termination of the spiral cord sculpture from above from a smooth deeply excavated umbilical depression which terminates in a small perforation, overhung by the reflexed inner-lip callus. Medially the inner lip has a callus projection which overhangs the umbilical depression. Spire low, about half the height of aperture.

The holotype of the species measures 3.3 mm (0.13 in) in length and has a diameter of 5.5 mm (0.22 in). The species can be differentiated from Risellopsis varia due to the presence of more strongly and evenly developed tricarinate keels, a more concave umbilical depression on the base sculpture, and a strong callus projection found on the outer reflexed edge of the inner-lip.

== Taxonomy ==
The species was first described by A. W. B. Powell in 1935, using the name Risellopsis prisca. In 1990, the species was recombined as Cirsochilus priscus by A. G. Beu and P. A. Maxwell in 1990. This, or its alternative representation Cirsochilus (Cirsochilus) priscus, are the currently accepted names for the species.

The holotype was collected at an unknown date prior to 1935 from southern Maukatia Bay near Muriwai, Auckland Region (then more commonly known as Motutara), and is held in the collections of Auckland War Memorial Museum.

== Distribution ==
This extinct marine species occurs in early Miocene strata of the Nihotupu Formation of New Zealand, on the west coast of the Waitākere Ranges of the Auckland Region, New Zealand.

== Gallery ==
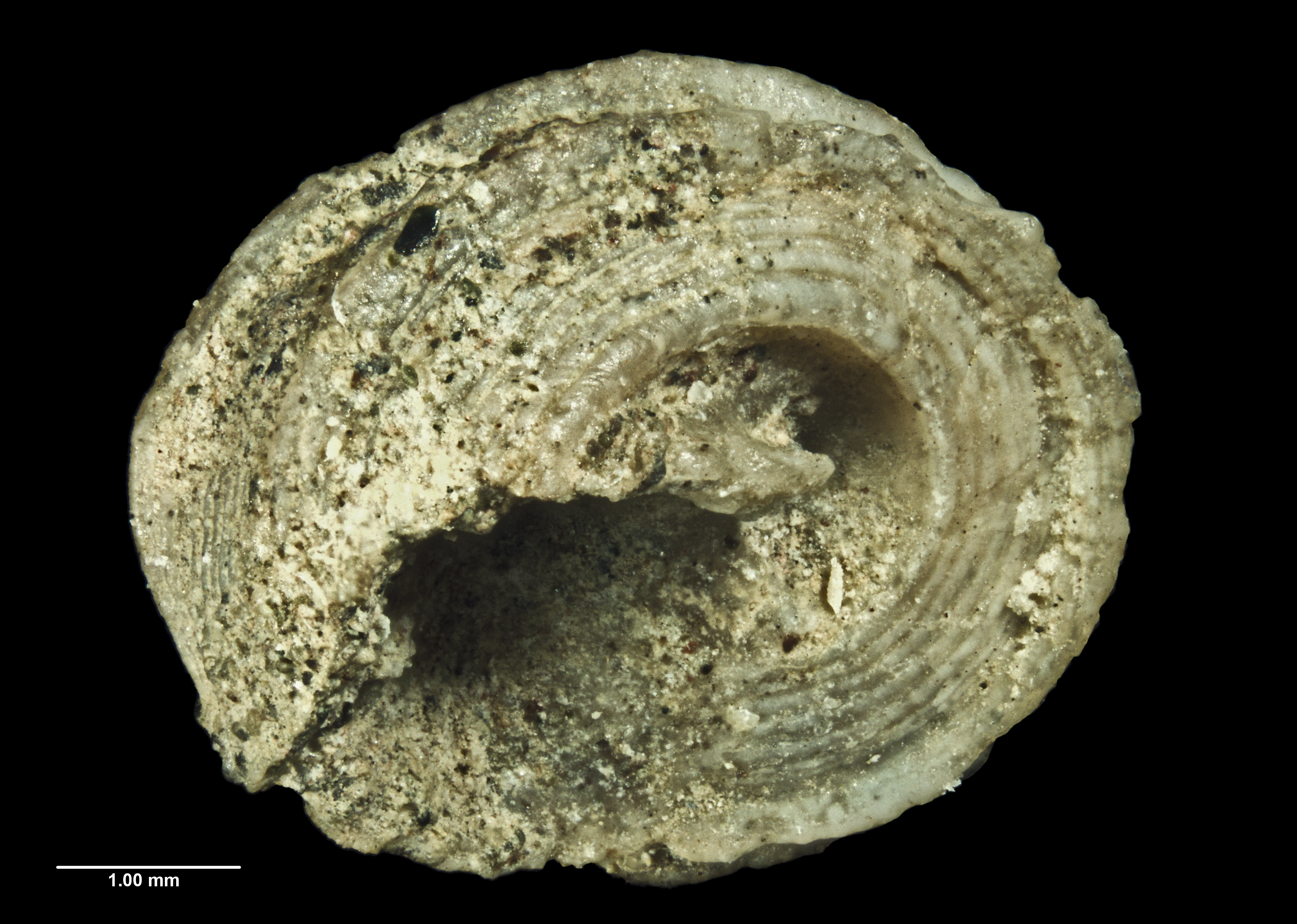
Underside view of holotype

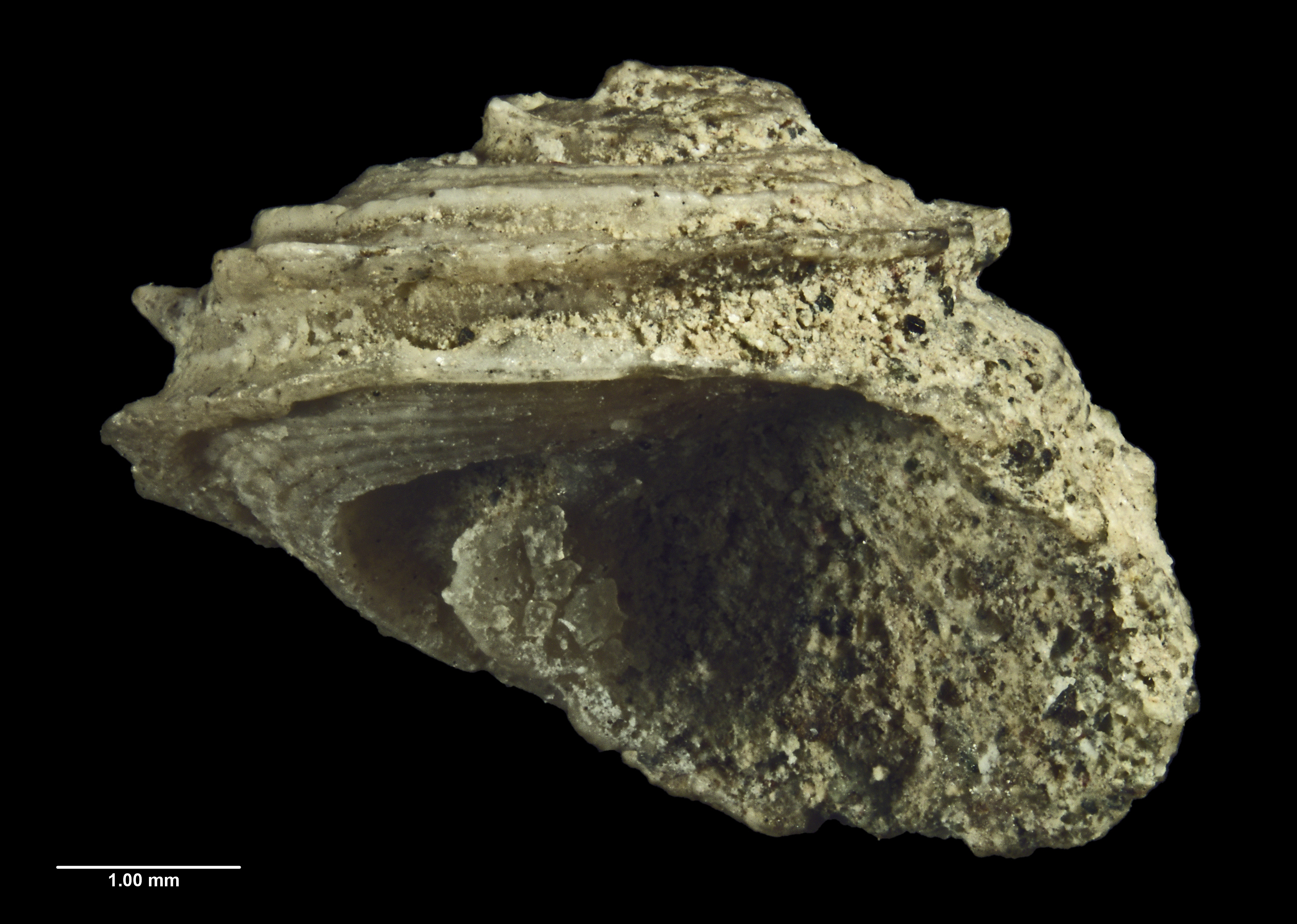
Side view of holotype
