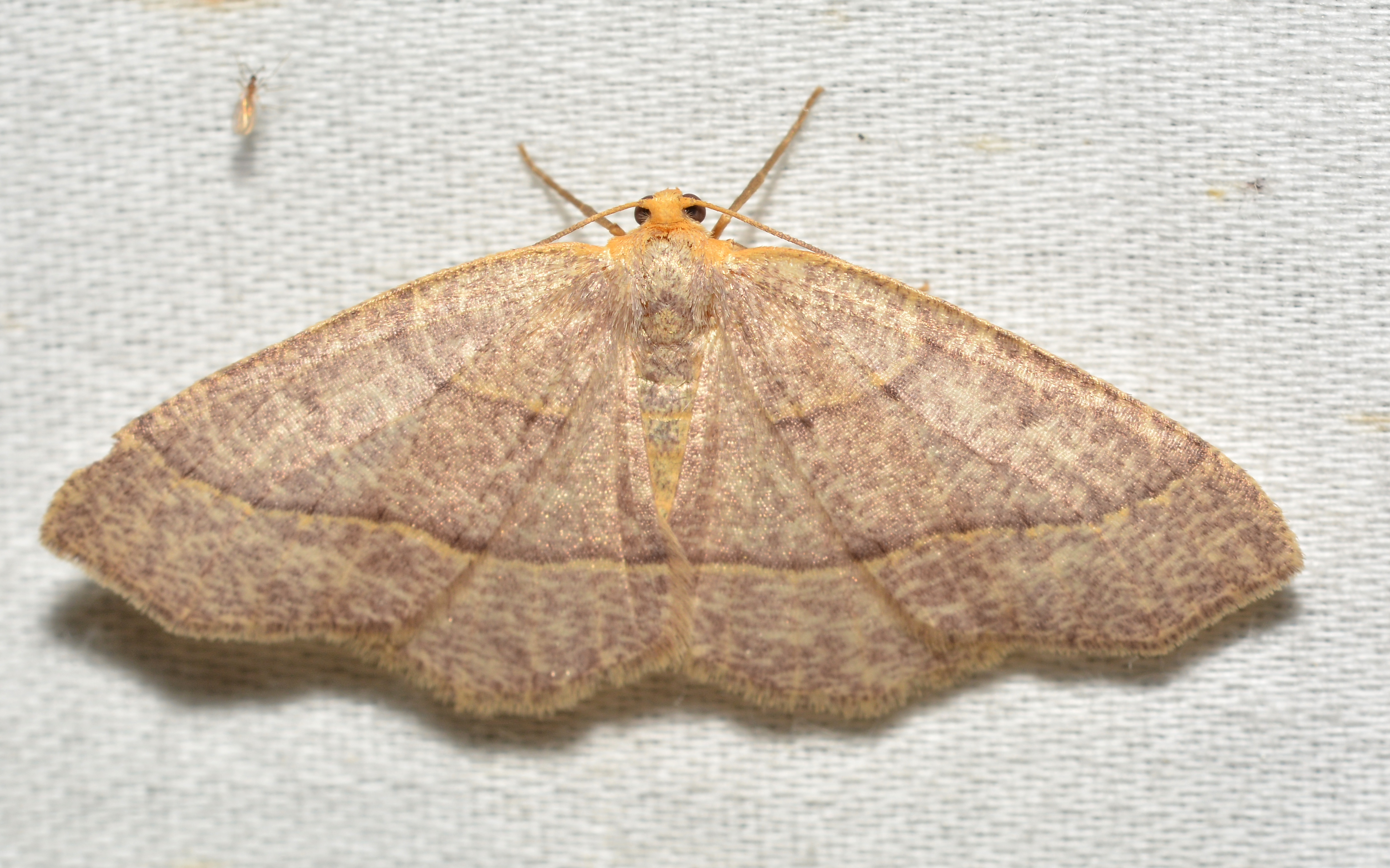
- Adult
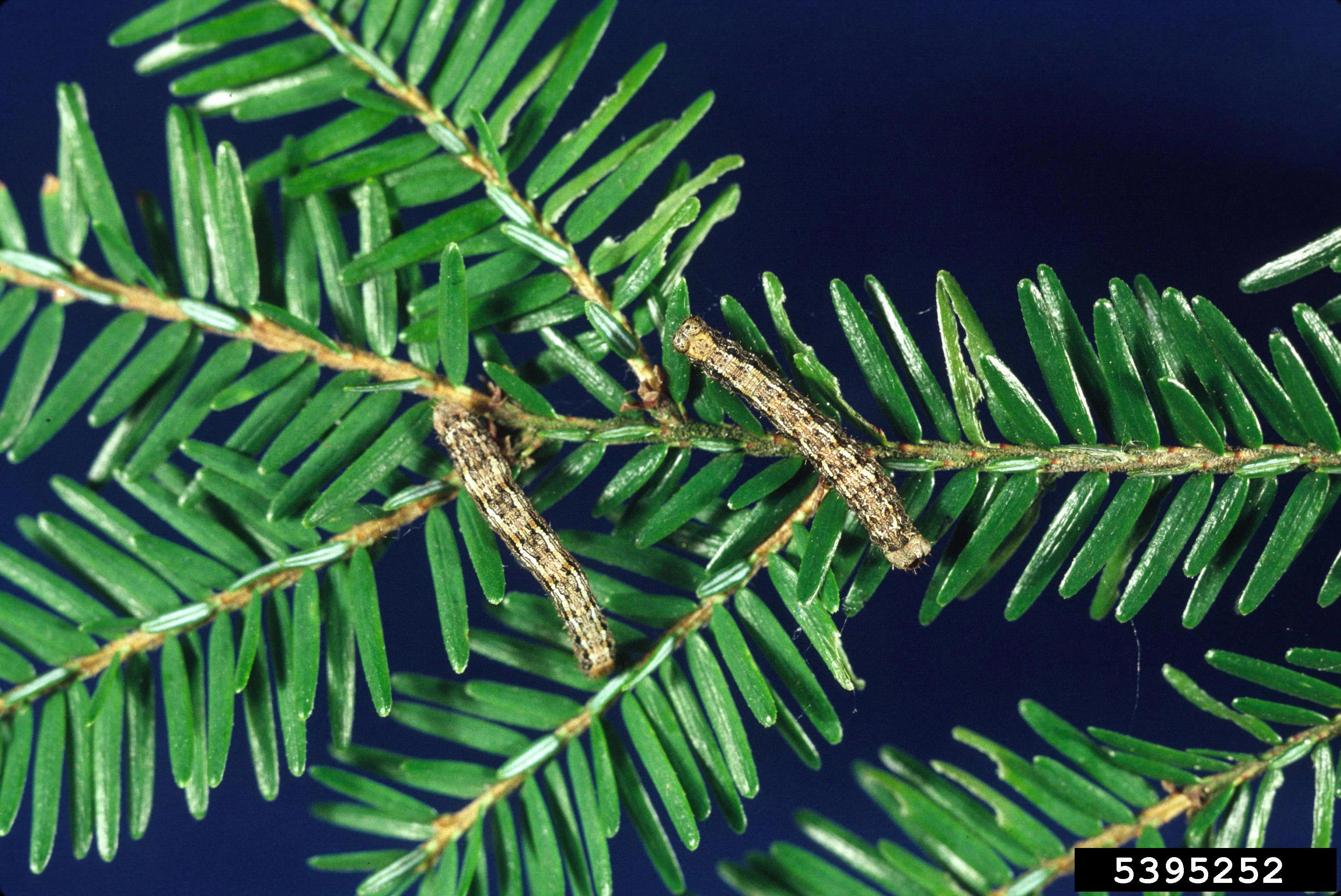
- Larva

Scientific classification
- Kingdom: Animalia
- Phylum: Arthropoda
- Clade: Pancrustacea
- Class: Insecta
- Order: Lepidoptera
- Family: Geometridae
- Genus: Lambdina
- Species: L. fervidaria

Binomial name
- Lambdina fervidaria Hübner, 1827

Synonyms
- Lambdina athasaria (Walker, 1860); Lambdina aequaliaria (Walker, 1860); Lambdina seminudata (Walker, 1863); Lambdina siccaria (Walker, 1866); Lambdina bibularia (Grote & Robinson, 1867); Lambdina semiundaria (Packard, 1867)

= Lambdina fervidaria =

Species of moth

Lambdina fervidaria, the curve-lined looper or spring hemlock looper, is a moth of the family Geometridae. It is found in Canada (Nova Scotia, Prince Edward Island, New Brunswick, Quebec, Ontario, Manitoba and Saskatchewan) and the eastern parts of the United States, south to Georgia.

The wingspan is about 27 mm. The moth flies from May to August depending on the location.

The larva feeds on Quercus and Fraxinus. The subspecies Lambdina fervidaria athasaria prefers Abies balsamea, Picea and Tsuga canadensis

== Subspecies ==
There are two recognised subspecies:

- Lambdina fervidaria fervidaria
- Lambdina fervidaria athasaria (Walker, 1860)
