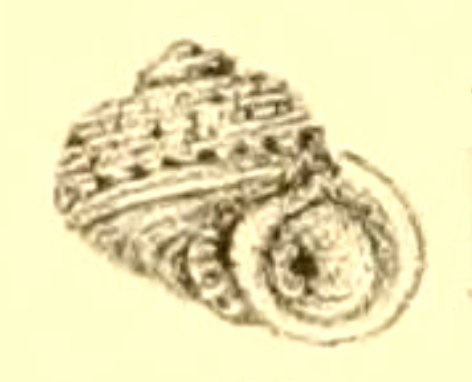
- Shell of Neocollonia ponsonbyi (holotype)

Scientific classification
- Kingdom: Animalia
- Phylum: Mollusca
- Class: Gastropoda
- Subclass: Vetigastropoda
- Order: Trochida
- Family: Colloniidae
- Genus: Neocollonia
- Species: N. ponsonbyi

Binomial name
- Neocollonia ponsonbyi (G.B. Sowerby III, 1897)

Synonyms
- Bothropoma ponsonbyi (G.B. Sowerby III, 1897); Turbo ponsonbyi G.B. Sowerby III, 1897 (original combination)

= Neocollonia ponsonbyi =

Species of gastropod

Neocollonia ponsonbyi is a species of sea snail, a marine gastropod mollusk in the family Colloniidae.

== Description ==
The shell grows to a length of 8 mm, its diameter also 8 mm.

(Original description in Latin) The subglobose shell is thick and deeply umbilicate. It is gray, spotted with brown and is densely spirally ridged. The ridges are rounded, articulated with small brown spots, with a smaller ridge intervening. The spire is briefly conical. The shell contains 4 convex whorls. The suture is canaliculated. The body whorl is rounded. The base of the shell is convex, with a thick nodose rib in the umbilical region and is bordered by a deep and rather wide groove. The aperture is almost circular, its interior white. The peristome is thick. The operculum is flat on the inside, convex on the outside, deeply umbilicate, wrinkled, bordered by a somewhat narrow keel.

== Distribution ==
This marine species occurs off Northeast Cape to Durban, South Africa
