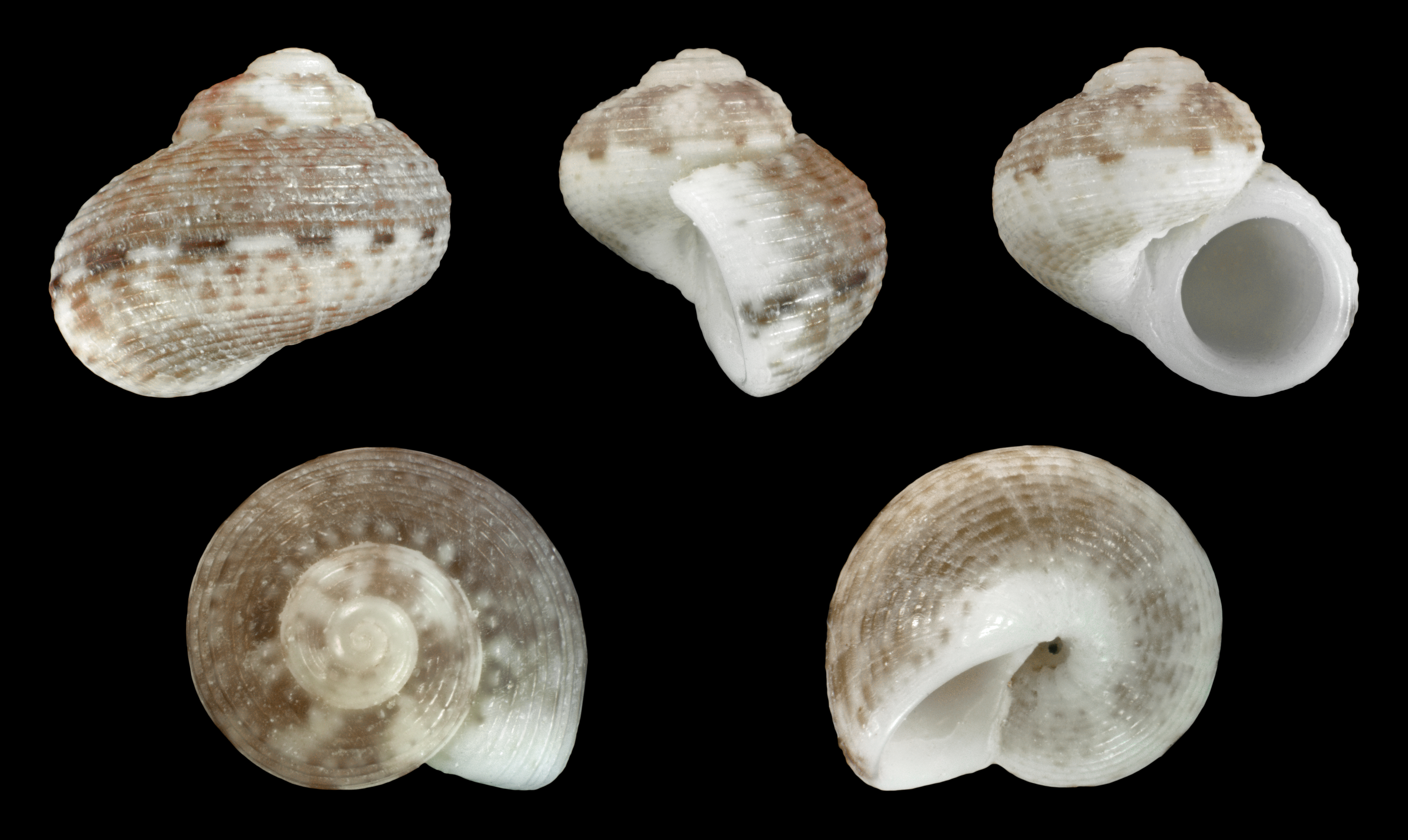
- A shell of Neocollonia pilula

Scientific classification
- Kingdom: Animalia
- Phylum: Mollusca
- Class: Gastropoda
- Subclass: Vetigastropoda
- Order: Trochida
- Family: Colloniidae
- Genus: Neocollonia
- Species: N. pilula

Binomial name
- Neocollonia pilula (Dunker, 1860)

Synonyms
- Bothropoma cf. pilula Bosch et al., 1995; Bothropoma isseli Thiele, 1924; Bothropoma pilula (Dunker, 1860) superseded combination; Bothropoma pilulum (Dunker, 1860) (wrong spelling of species name; pilula is a noun in apposition); Collonia japonica (A. Adams, 1861); Collonia pilula (Dunker, 1860); Complicatacollonista isseli (Thiele, 1924) superseded combination; Cynisca japonica A. Adams, 1861 (junior synonym); Leptothyra inepta (Gould, 1861); Leptothyra pilula R. W. Dunker, 1860; Liotia pilula Dunker, 1860 (original combination); Monilea inepta Gould, 1861; Monilea rotundata G. B. Sowerby III, 1894 (junior synonym); Neocollonia diversicolor Poppe, Tagaro & S.-I Huang, 2023 junior subjective synonym; Neocollonia inepta (A. Gould, 1861) junior subjective synonym; Neocollonia isseli (Thiele, 1924) junior subjective synonym; Neocollonia kantori Poppe, Tagaro & S.-I Huang, 2023 junior subjective synonym; Neocollonia pilula (Dunker, 1860); Neocollonia pilula pilula (Dunker, 1860); Neocollonia splendida Poppe, Tagaro & S.-I Huang, 2023 · unaccepted > junior subjective synonym

= Neocollonia pilula =

Species of gastropod

Neocollonia pilula is a species of sea snail, a marine gastropod mollusk in the family Colloniidae.

Subspecies

- Neocollonia pilula rosa (Pilsbry, 1904) : synonym of Planacollonista rosa (Pilsbry, 1904) (superseded combination)

== Description ==
The shell grows to a size of 5 mm.

(Description of Monilea inepta, originally in Latin) The small, solid, ovate-conical shell is encircled by articulated threads, one of which is more prominent, in rosy or clay-colored hues with paler intervals. The sutural region is tessellated, with 4 convex whorls and a blunt apex. The base is convex, with a moderate, plicate umbilicus encircled by a whitish band. The aperture is circular with a thick, simple lip, and the columella is smooth.

== Distribution ==
This marine species occurs off South Japan, China; off Papua New Guinea and the Philippines. It has also been recorded in the Red Sea and off Madagascar.
