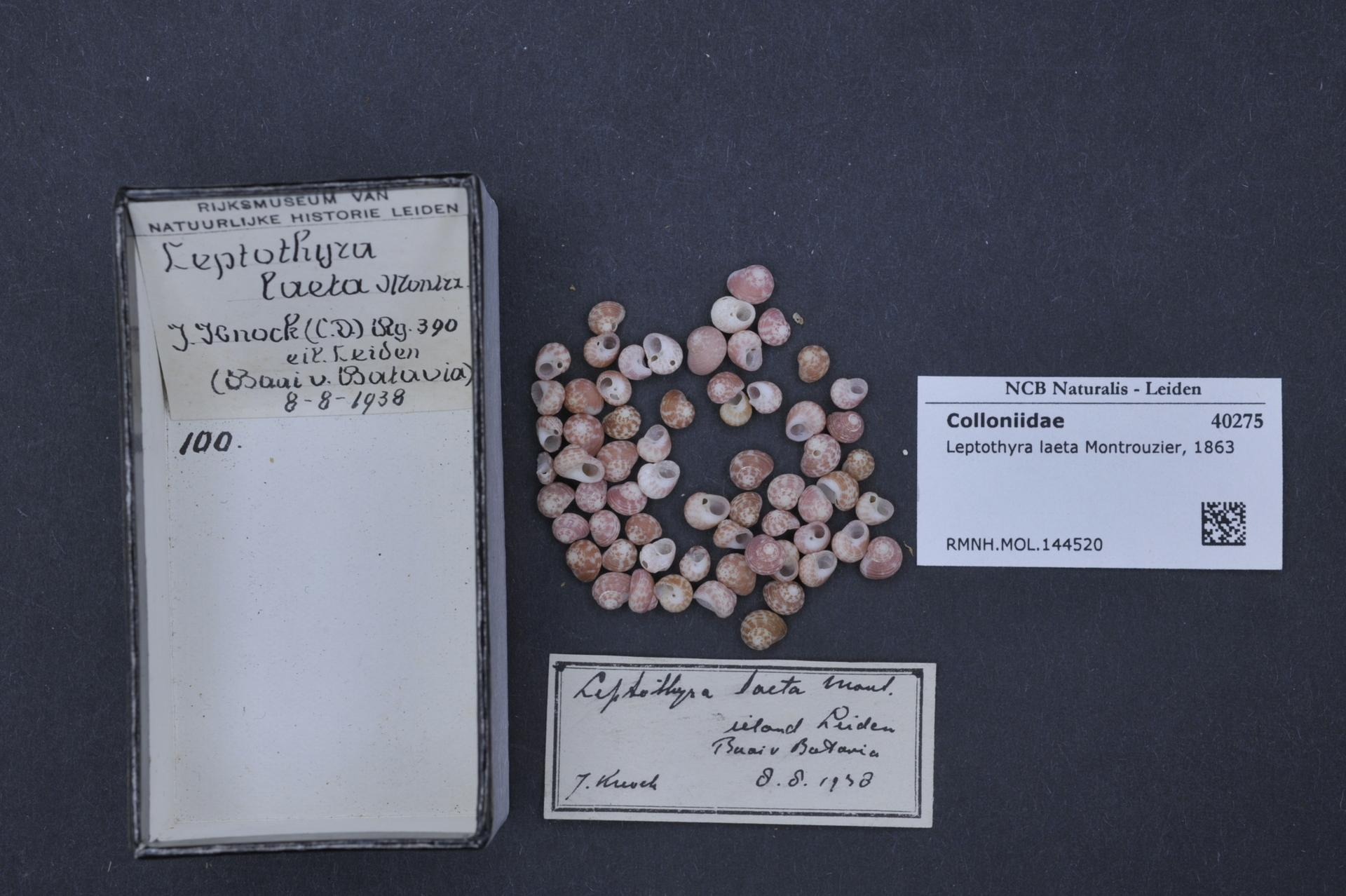
- Artiscollonia granulosa shells

Scientific classification
- Kingdom: Animalia
- Phylum: Mollusca
- Class: Gastropoda
- Subclass: Vetigastropoda
- Order: Trochida
- Family: Colloniidae
- Subfamily: Colloniinae
- Genus: Artiscollonia; Poppe, Tagaro & S.-I Huang, 2023

Type species
- Artiscollonia mainguyi Poppe, Tagaro & S.-I Huang, 2023

= Artiscollonia =

Genus of gastropod

Artiscollonia is a genus of small sea snail with calcareous opercula, a marine gastropod mollusk in the family Colloniidae.

== Species ==
- Artiscollonia fedosovi Poppe, Tagaro & S.-I Huang, 2023
- Artiscollonia granulosa (Pease, 1868)
- Artiscollonia mainguyi Poppe, Tagaro & S.-I Huang, 2023
- Artiscollonia mirans Poppe, Tagaro & S.-I Huang, 2023
- Artiscollonia monalizae Poppe, Tagaro & S.-I Huang, 2023
- Artiscollonia nix Poppe, Tagaro & S.-I Huang, 2023
- Artiscollonia placens Poppe, Tagaro & S.-I Huang, 2023
- Artiscollonia tongana Poppe, Tagaro & S.-I Huang, 2023
