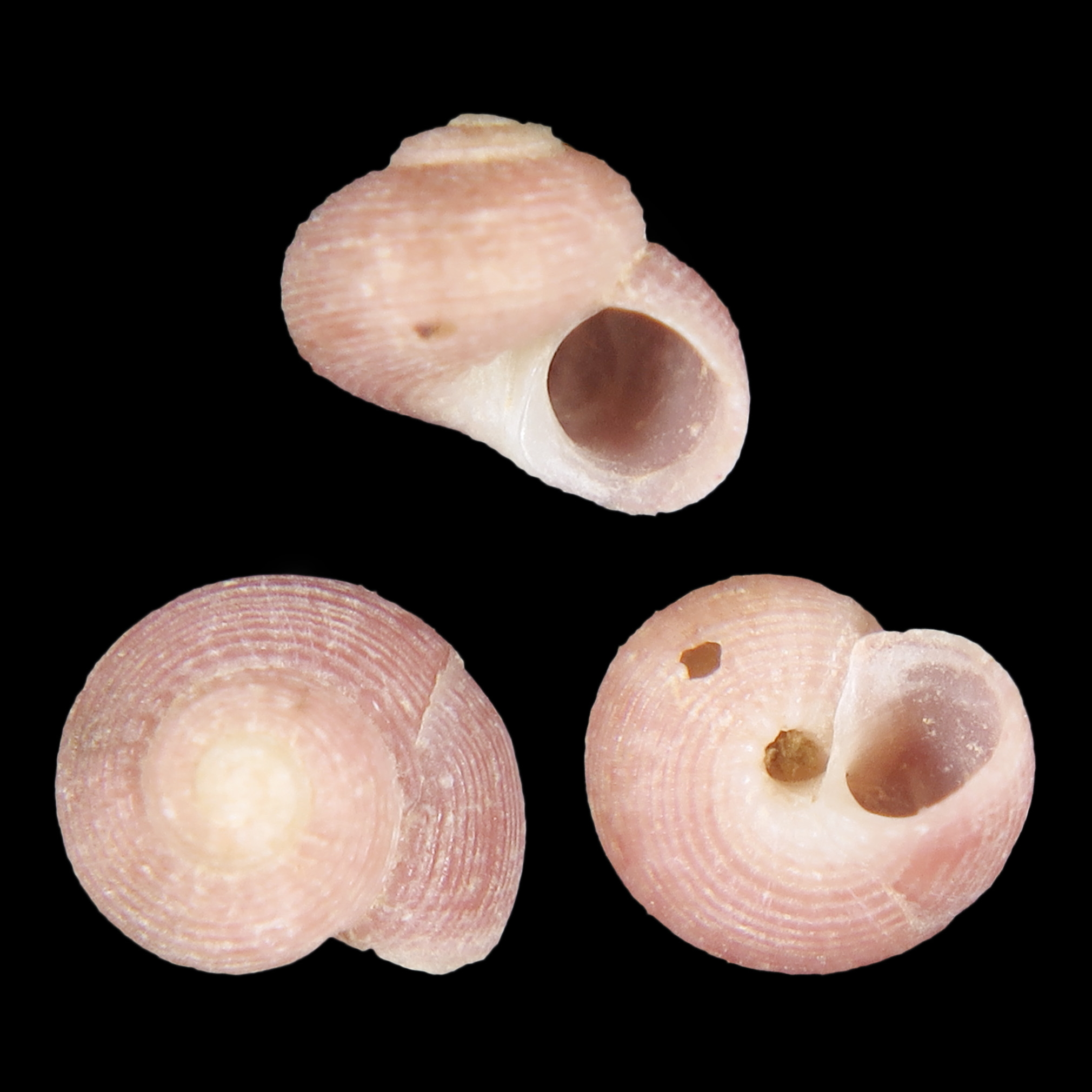
- ~Shell of Neocollonia roseobrunneis (holotype at MNHN, Paris)

Scientific classification
- Kingdom: Animalia
- Phylum: Mollusca
- Class: Gastropoda
- Subclass: Vetigastropoda
- Order: Trochida
- Family: Colloniidae
- Genus: Neocollonia; Kuroda & T. Habe, 1954

Type species
- Liotia pilula Dunker, 1860

Synonyms
- Bothropoma Thiele, 1924 (junior homonym of Geophorus (Bothropoma) A. J. Wagner, 1908) ·

= Neocollonia =

Genus of gastropods

Neocollonia is a genus of sea snails, marine gastropod mollusks in the subfamily Colloniinae of the family Colloniidae.

== Species ==
Species within the genus Neocollonia include:

- Neocollonia astrolabensis (Melvill, 1897)
- Neocollonia comorensis Poppe, Tagaro & S.-I Huang, 2023
- Neocollonia decorata (Thiele, 1930)
- Neocollonia gardineri (Melvill, 1909)
- Neocollonia gotoi Poppe & Tagaro, 2026
- Neocollonia mcleani Poppe, Tagaro & S.-I Huang, 2023
- † Neocollonia mediocarinata (Reich & Wesselingh, 2014)
- Neocollonia miltochrista (Melvill, 1918)
- Neocollonia munda (H. Adams, 1873)
- Neocollonia pilula (Dunker, 1860)
- Neocollonia ponsonbyi (G. B. Sowerby III, 1897)
- † Neocollonia pseudomunda (Harzhauser, 2014)
- Neocollonia rhysopoma (Barnard, 1964)
- Neocollonia roseobrunneis Poppe, Tagaro & S.-I Huang, 2023

The following species used to belong to Bothropoma Thiele, 1924 (junior homonym of Geophorus (Bothropoma) A. J. Wagner, 1908)

- Bothropoma bellulum (H. Adams, 1873): synonym of Depressipoma pentegoniostoma (P. P. Carpenter, 1856)
- Bothropoma decoratum Thiele, 1930: synonym of Neocollonia decorata (Thiele, 1930)
- Bothropoma isseli Thiele, 1929: synonym of Neocollonia pilula (Dunker, 1860) (junior subjective synonym)
- Bothropoma mundum (H. Adams, 1873): synonym of Neocollonia munda (H. Adams, 1873)
- Bothropoma pilula (Dunker, 1860): synonym of Neocollonia pilula (Dunker, 1860) (superseded combination)
- Bothropoma ponsonbyi (Sowerby, 1897): synonym of Neocollonia ponsonbyi (G. B. Sowerby III, 1897)
- Bothropoma rhysopoma (Barnard, 1964): synonym of Neocollonia rhysopoma (Barnard, 1964)
