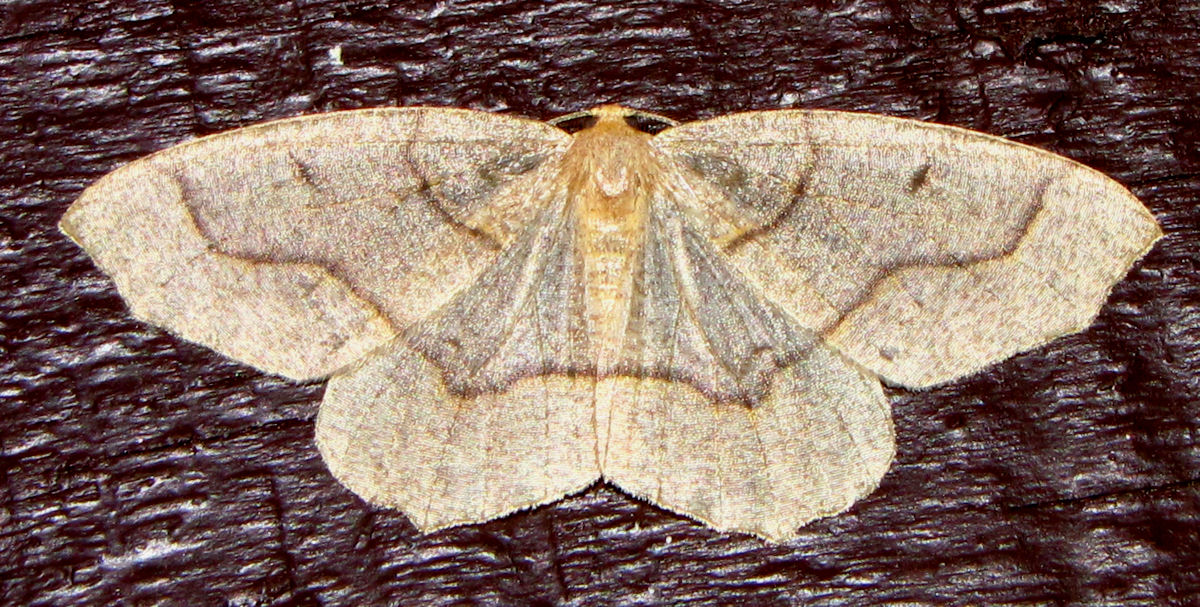
- Lambdina fiscellaria

Scientific classification
- Domain: Eukaryota
- Kingdom: Animalia
- Phylum: Arthropoda
- Class: Insecta
- Order: Lepidoptera
- Family: Geometridae
- Tribe: Ourapterygini
- Genus: Lambdina; Capps, 1943

= Lambdina =

Genus of moths

Lambdina is a genus of moths in the family Geometridae first described by Hahn William Capps in 1943.

== Species ==
Listed alphabetically:

- Lambdina canitiaria Rupert, 1944
- Lambdina fervidaria (Hübner, 1827) - curve-lined looper
  - Lambdina fervidaria athasaria (Walker, 1860) - spring hemlock looper
- Lambdina fiscellaria (Guenée, 1857) - mournful thorn or hemlock looper
- Lambdina flavilinearia (Barnes & McDunnough, 1913)
- Lambdina laeta (Hulst, 1900)
- Lambdina pellucidaria (Grote & Robinson, 1867) - pitch pine looper, eastern pine looper or yellow-headed looper
- Lambdina phantoma (Barnes & McDunnough, 1916)
- Lambdina pultaria (Guenée, 1857)
- Lambdina vitraria (Grote, 1883)
