= Lambdina pultaria =

Scientific classification
- Kingdom: Animalia
- Phylum: Arthropoda
- Class: Insecta
- Order: Lepidoptera
- Family: Geometridae
- Tribe: Ourapterygini
- Genus: Lambdina
- Species: L. pultaria

Binomial name
- Lambdina pultaria (Guenée in Boisduval & Guenée, 1858)

Synonyms
- Ellopia invexata Walker, 1863; Ellopia pultaria Guenée in Boisduval and Guenée, 1858; Ellopia scitata Walker, 1863

Species of moth

Lambdina pultaria, the southern oak looper, is a species of geometrid moth in the family Geometridae. It is found in North America.

The MONA or Hodges number for Lambdina pultaria is 6889.
