= Neocollonia rhysopoma =

Scientific classification
- Kingdom: Animalia
- Phylum: Mollusca
- Class: Gastropoda
- Subclass: Vetigastropoda
- Order: Trochida
- Family: Colloniidae
- Genus: Neocollonia
- Species: N. rhysopoma

Binomial name
- Neocollonia rhysopoma (Barnard, 1964)

Synonyms
- Bothropoma rhysopoma (Barnard, 1964); Calcar rhysopoma Barnard, 1964 (original combination)

Species of gastropod

Neocollonia rhysopoma is a species of sea snail, a marine gastropod mollusk in the family Colloniidae.

== Description ==
The length of the shell attains 2.5 mm.

== Distribution ==
This marine species occurs off Natal, South Africa.
