= Lambdina flavilinearia =

Scientific classification
- Domain: Eukaryota
- Kingdom: Animalia
- Phylum: Arthropoda
- Class: Insecta
- Order: Lepidoptera
- Family: Geometridae
- Genus: Lambdina
- Species: L. flavilinearia

Binomial name
- Lambdina flavilinearia (Barnes & McDunnough, 1913)

Synonyms
- Therina flavilinearia Barnes & McDunnough, 1913

Species of moth

Lambdina flavilinearia is a species of moth in the family Geometridae first described by William Barnes and James Halliday McDunnough in 1913. It is found in North America.

The MONA or Hodges number for Lambdina flavilinearia is 6890.
