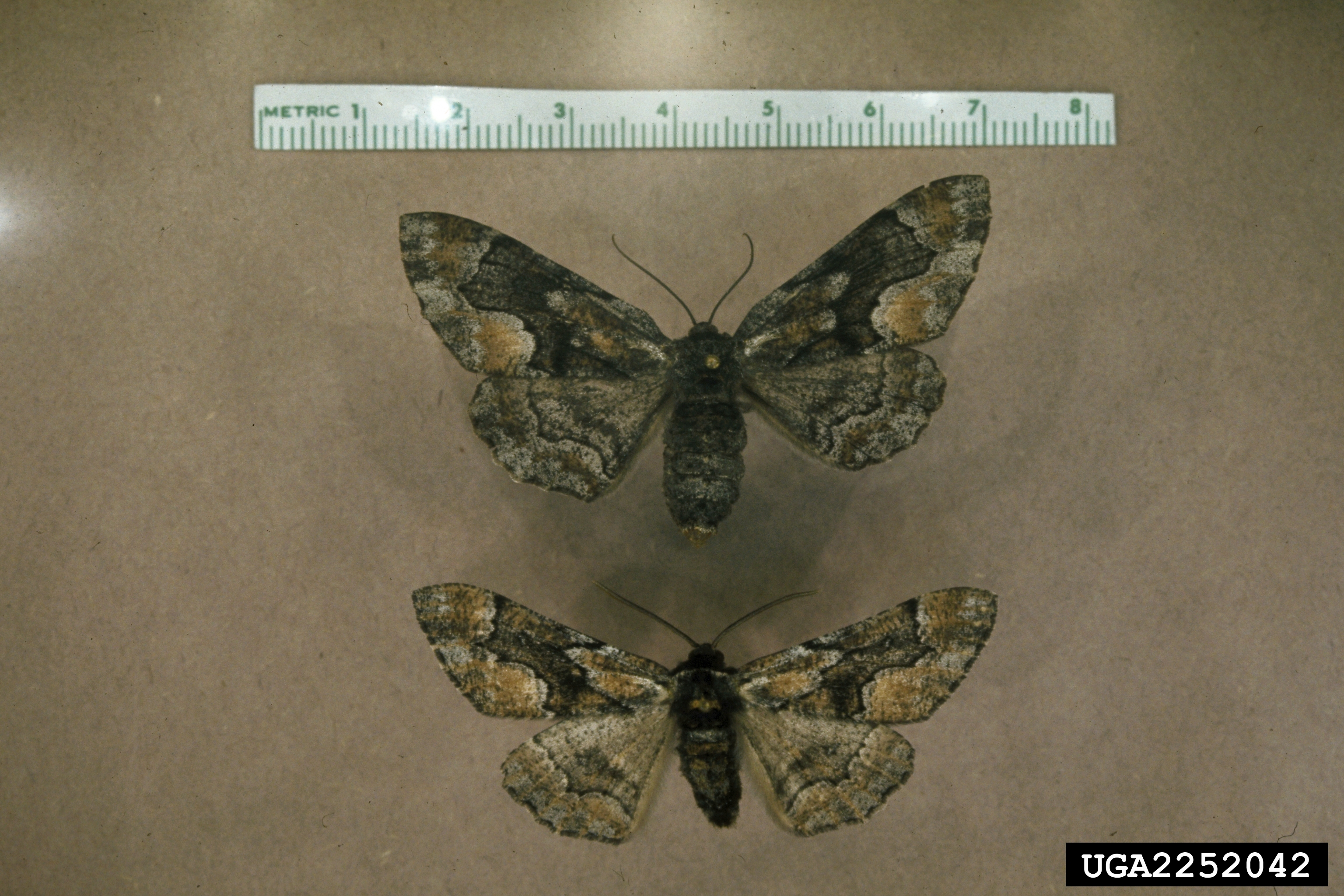

Scientific classification
- Kingdom: Animalia
- Phylum: Arthropoda
- Class: Insecta
- Order: Lepidoptera
- Family: Geometridae
- Genus: Lambdina
- Species: L. pellucidaria

Binomial name
- Lambdina pellucidaria Grote & Robinson, 1867

= Lambdina pellucidaria =

Species of moth

Lambdina pellucidaria, known by the common names pitch pine looper, eastern pine looper and yellow-headed looper, is a moth of the family Geometridae. It is found in eastern parts of the United States, from New York west to Illinois and south to Georgia.

The wingspan is about 33 mm. The moth flies from March to June depending on the location.

The larvae feed on pitch, red, and other hard pines, as well as oak.

When adults emerge they lay eggs on both sides of needles. Larvae hatch and feed on needles until late September in the northeast US (varies depending on location). When they are full grown they drop to the ground, overwinter and pupate in the duff underneath the trees.

Larvae are 1-1.5 inches, pale brown to greenish-grayish bodies, with lighter dorsum and darker striped and sides, yellow legs, spotted head and black spiracles. They vary considerably in coloring and are often best identified by observing if needles are mined rather than eaten completely, as most other loopers will do.
