= Collonia incerta =

Scientific classification
- Kingdom: Animalia
- Phylum: Mollusca
- Class: Gastropoda
- Subclass: Vetigastropoda
- Order: Trochida
- Superfamily: Trochoidea
- Family: Colloniidae
- Subfamily: Colloniinae
- Genus: Collonia
- Species: C. incerta

Binomial name
- Collonia incerta (E. A. Smith, 1890)

Synonyms
- Turbo (Collonia) incerta E. A. Smith, 1890

Species of gastropod

Collonia incerta is a species of small sea snail with calcareous opercula, a marine gastropod mollusk in the family Colloniidae.
