= Collonia admissa =

Scientific classification
- Kingdom: Animalia
- Phylum: Mollusca
- Class: Gastropoda
- Subclass: Vetigastropoda
- Order: Trochida
- Superfamily: Trochoidea
- Family: Colloniidae
- Subfamily: Colloniinae
- Genus: Collonia
- Species: C. admissa

Binomial name
- Collonia admissa (E. A. Smith, 1890)

Synonyms
- Turbo (Collonia) admissus E. A. Smith, 1890

Species of gastropod

Collonia admissa is a species of small sea snail with calcareous opercula, a marine gastropod mollusk in the family Colloniidae.

== Description ==
The shell grows to a height of 2.5 mm.

== Distribution ==
This species occurs in the Atlantic Ocean off St Helena.
