= Neocollonia decorata =

Scientific classification
- Kingdom: Animalia
- Phylum: Mollusca
- Class: Gastropoda
- Subclass: Vetigastropoda
- Order: Trochida
- Family: Colloniidae
- Genus: Neocollonia
- Species: N. decorata

Binomial name
- Neocollonia decorata (Thiele, 1930)

Synonyms
- Bothropoma decoratum Thiele, 1930 ·

Species of gastropod

Neocollonia decorata is a species of sea snail, a marine gastropod mollusk in the family Colloniidae.

== Distribution ==
This marine species occurs off Western Australia.
