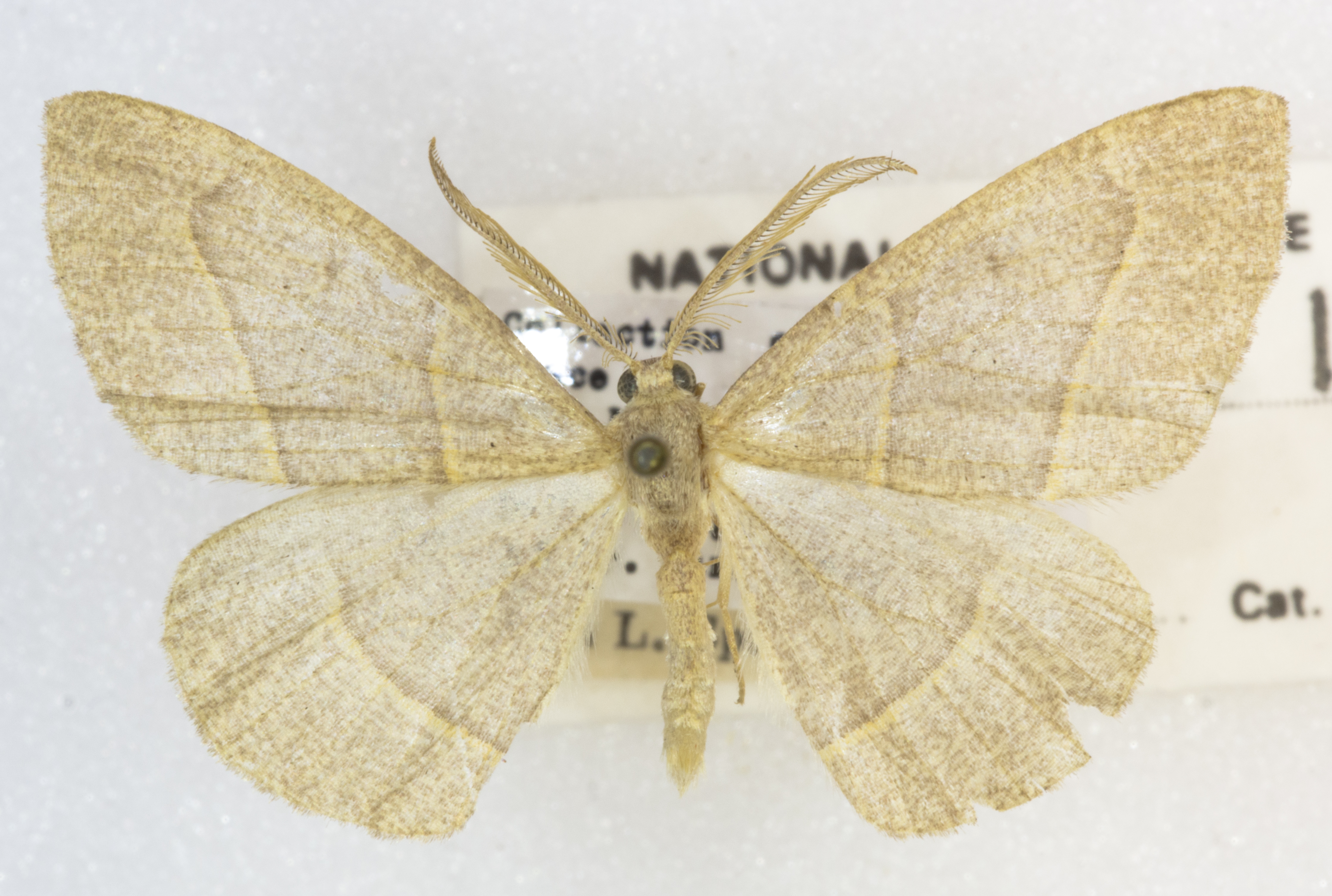

Scientific classification
- Domain: Eukaryota
- Kingdom: Animalia
- Phylum: Arthropoda
- Class: Insecta
- Order: Lepidoptera
- Family: Geometridae
- Genus: Lambdina
- Species: L. laeta

Binomial name
- Lambdina laeta (Hulst, 1900)

Synonyms
- Therina laeta Hulst, 1900

= Lambdina laeta =

Species of moth

Lambdina laeta is a species of geometrid moth in the family Geometridae. It is found in North America.

The MONA or Hodges number for Lambdina laeta is 6891.
