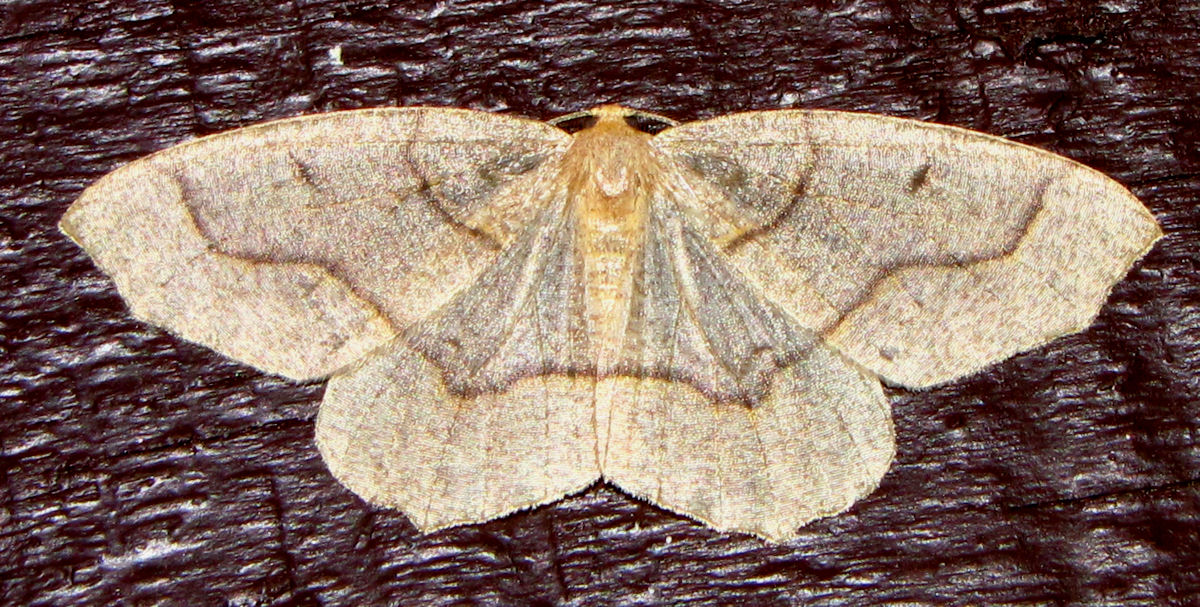
- Bon Echo Provincial Park, Ontario

Scientific classification
- Kingdom: Animalia
- Phylum: Arthropoda
- Clade: Pancrustacea
- Class: Insecta
- Order: Lepidoptera
- Family: Geometridae
- Genus: Lambdina
- Species: L. fiscellaria

Binomial name
- Lambdina fiscellaria Guenée, 1857

Subspecies
- 3, see text

Synonyms
- Ellopia fiscellaria Guenée; Ellopia fervidaria Hubner; Ellopia somniaria Hulst; Lambdina flagitiaria Guenée, (1858); Lambdina peccataria Guenée, (1858); Lambdina johnsoni Swett, 1913; Lambdina turbataria Barnes & McDunnough, 1916; Therina fiscellaria

= Lambdina fiscellaria =

Species of moth

Lambdina fiscellaria, the mournful thorn or hemlock looper, is a moth of the family Geometridae. It is found in North America, from the Pacific to the Atlantic coast and from Canada south to Pennsylvania, Wisconsin and California.

The wingspan is about 35 mm. The moth flies from August to early October depending on the location.

The larvae feed on hemlock, balsam fir, white spruce, oak and other hardwoods.

== Subspecies ==
There are three recognized subspecies:

- Lambdina fiscellaria fiscellaria – eastern hemlock looper
- Lambdina fiscellaria lugubrosa – western hemlock looper
- Lambdina fiscellaria somniaria – western oak looper or Garry oak looper
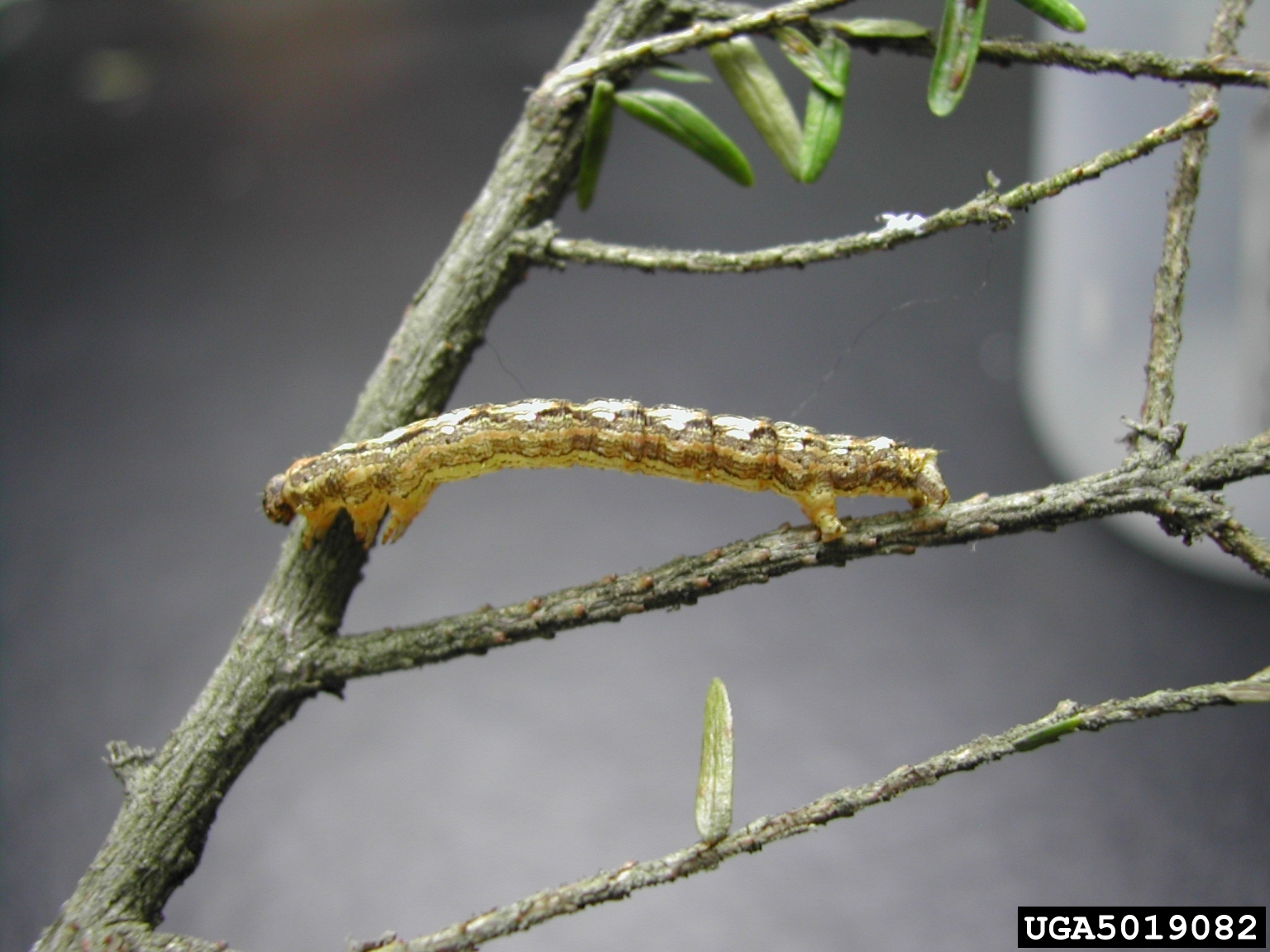
Lambdina fiscellaria fiscellaria caterpillar

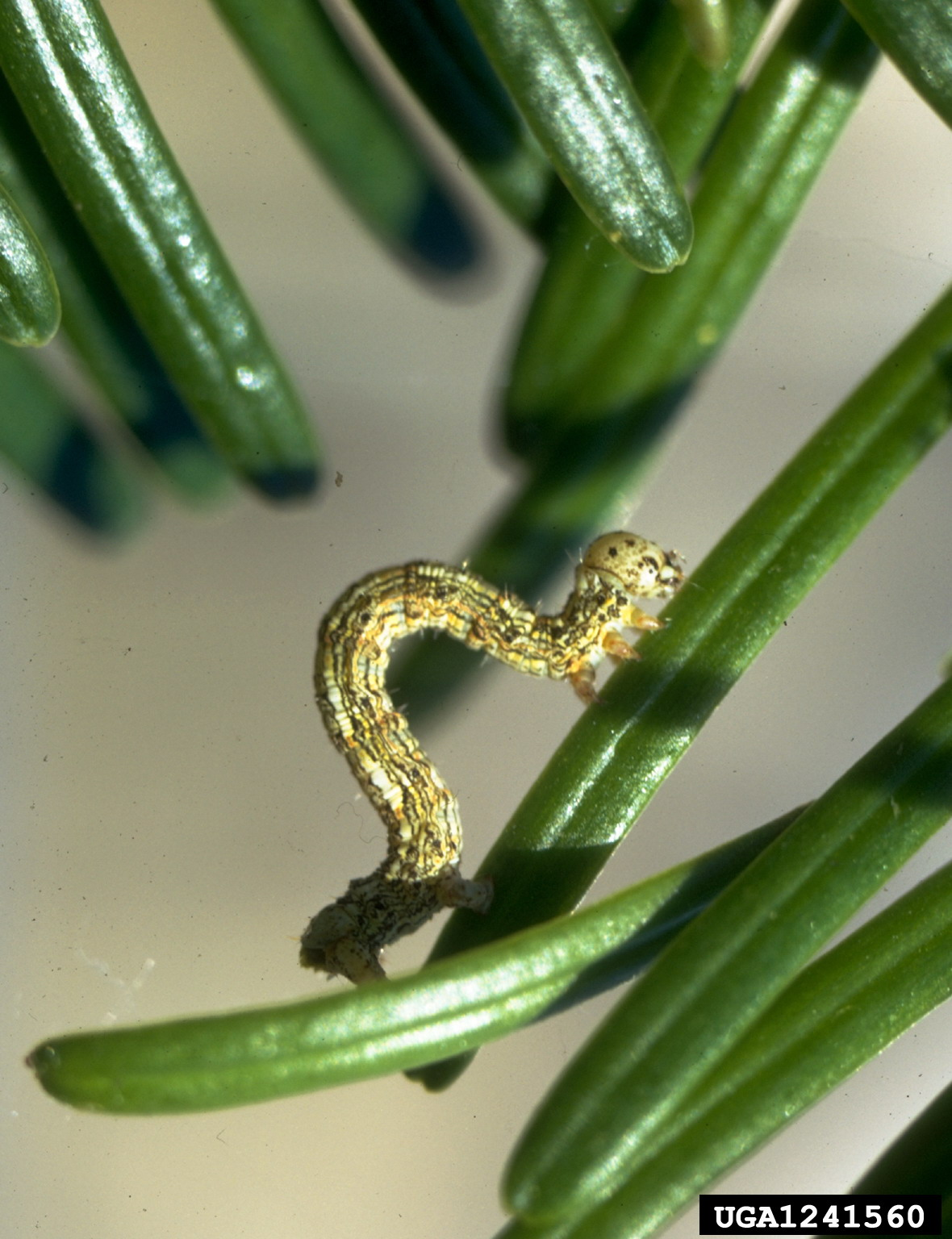
Lambdina fiscellaria lugubrosa caterpillar

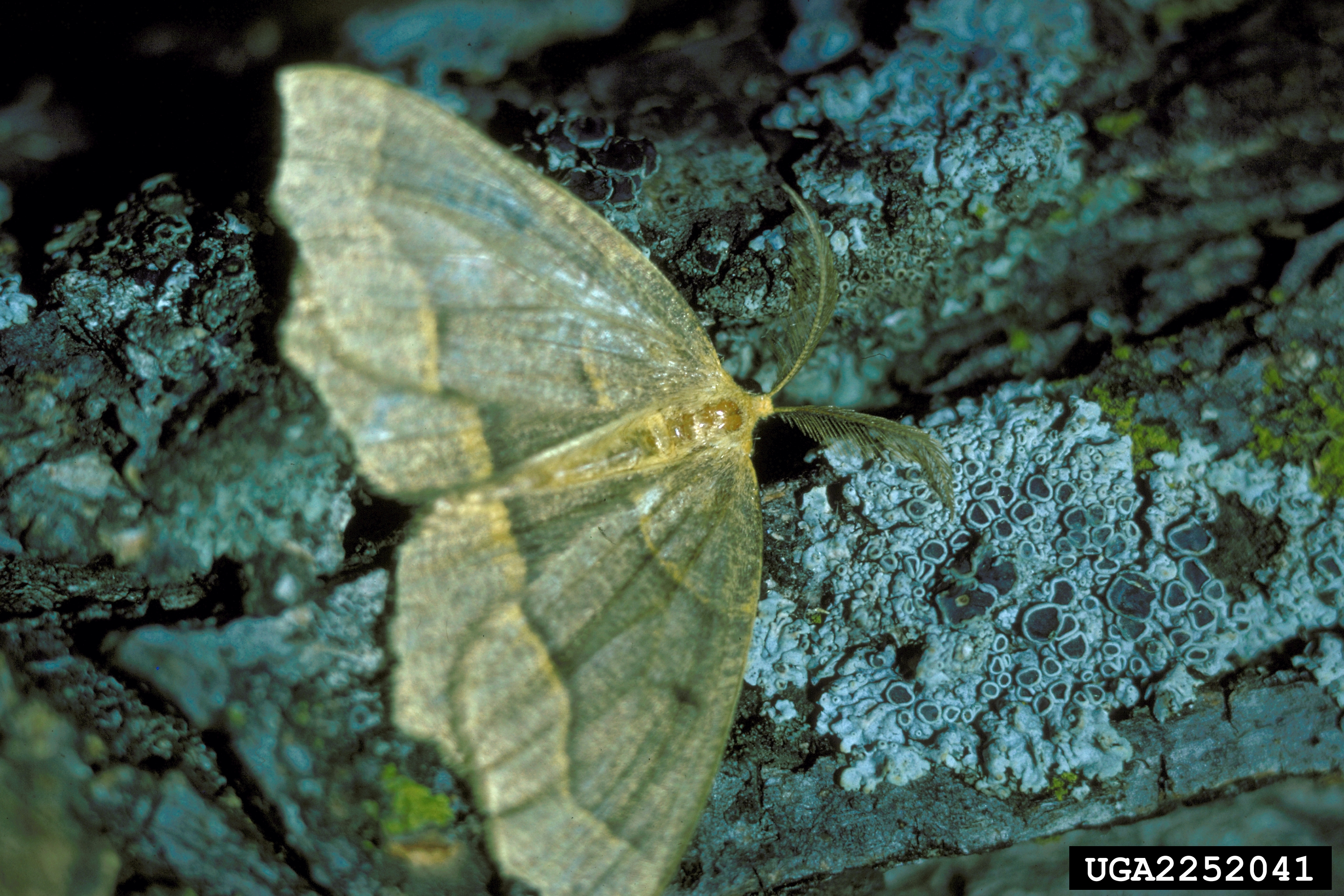
Lambdina fiscellaria somniaria adult

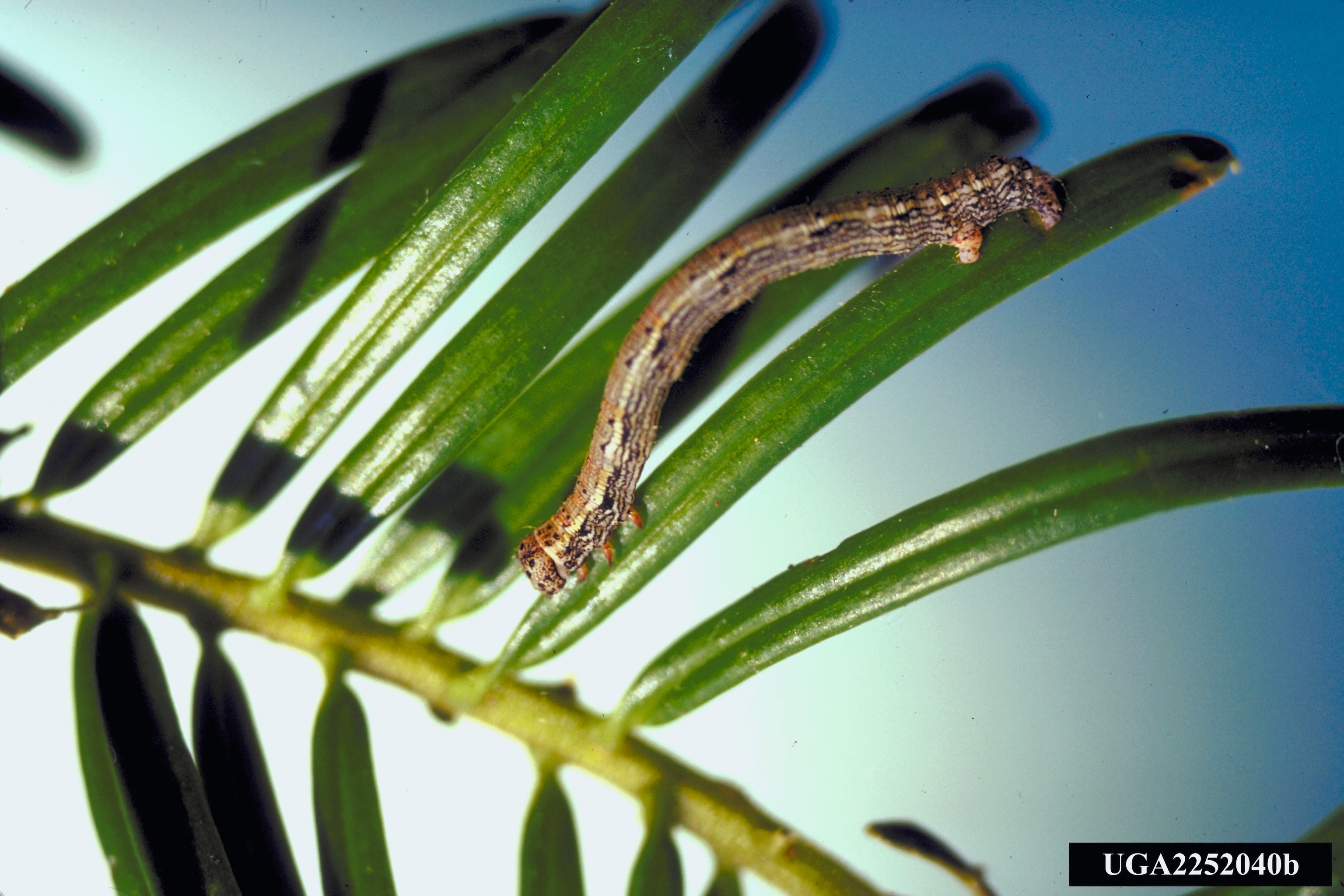
Lambdina fiscellaria somniaria caterpillar

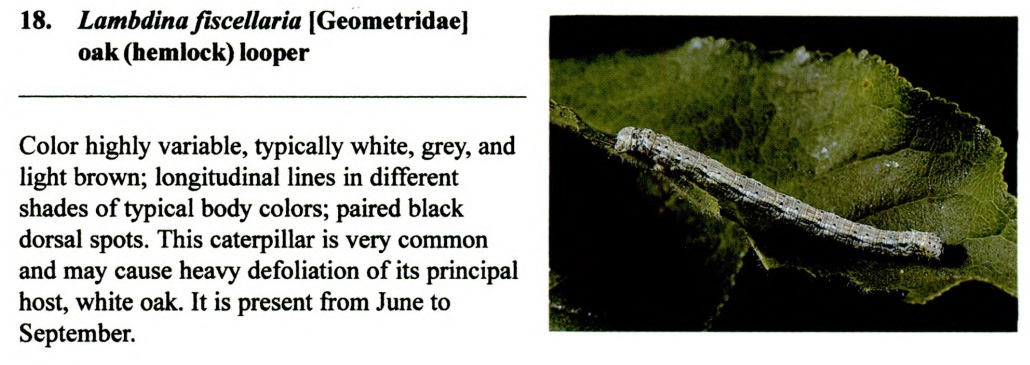
Lambdina fiscellaria caterpillar
