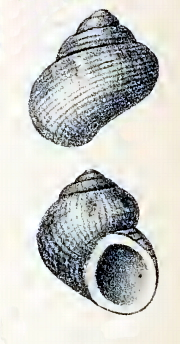
- Drawing with two views of a shell of Yaronia gestroi

Scientific classification
- Kingdom: Animalia
- Phylum: Mollusca
- Class: Gastropoda
- Subclass: Vetigastropoda
- Order: Trochida
- Family: Colloniidae
- Genus: Yaronia
- Species: Y. gestroi

Binomial name
- Yaronia gestroi (Caramagna, 1888)

Synonyms
- Collonia gestroi Caramagna, 1888; Leptothyra gestroi (Caramagna, 1888)

= Yaronia gestroi =

Species of gastropod

Yaronia gestroi is a species of sea snail, a marine gastropod mollusk in the family Colloniidae.

== Description ==
The shell attains a height of 15 mm. The thick, imperforate shell has a conoid shape. It is whitish. The five whorls are convex, separated by a slightly profound suture. They are all over obliquely minutely striate. encircled by minutely granulose lirae, with smaller ones intercalated. The three first whorls are but little projecting, the fourth is double the length of the first three, the last whorl is inflated. The penultimate and last whorls contain a median series of reddish-brown quadrangular maculations or have the spiral lirae articulated with brown. Beneath they show a less obvious zone of the same color;. The spiral lines number 7 to 8 on the penultimate whorl, 15 on the body whorl. The outer lip is acute, slightly sulcate, with dots of carmine. The inner lip is arcuate, reflexed, and planate. The aperture is subrotund and pearly. The operculum is calcareous and also pearly.

== Distribution ==
This species occurs in the Red Sea and in the Indian Ocean off Madagascar.
