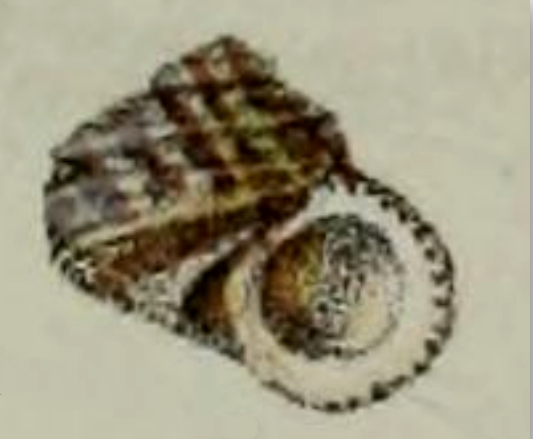
- Shell of Neocollonia munda (holotype)

Scientific classification
- Kingdom: Animalia
- Phylum: Mollusca
- Class: Gastropoda
- Subclass: Vetigastropoda
- Order: Trochida
- Family: Colloniidae
- Genus: Neocollonia
- Species: N. munda

Binomial name
- Neocollonia munda (H. Adams, 1873)

Synonyms
- Bothropoma cf. munda Bosch et al., 1995; Bothropoma mundum (H. Adams, 1873); Collonia munda H. Adams, 1873 superseded combination

= Neocollonia munda =

Species of gastropod

Nepcollona munda is a species of sea snail, a marine gastropod mollusk in the family Colloniidae.

== Description ==
The length of the shell attains 4 mm, its width 4 mm.

(Original description in Latin) The depressed-turbinate shell is solid and narrowly umbilicate. It is encircled by numerous ridges, with larger ones at the periphery. The surface is closely striated longitudinally. It is whitish, and adorned with pale tawny streaks and spots. It features 4 convex whorls, angular above, with the body whorl having a slightly convex base. The umbilicus is bordered by a crenulated cord. The circular aperture is accompanied by a varicose, strongly crenulated peristome

== Distribution ==
This species occurs in the Red Sea and the Arabian Sea.
