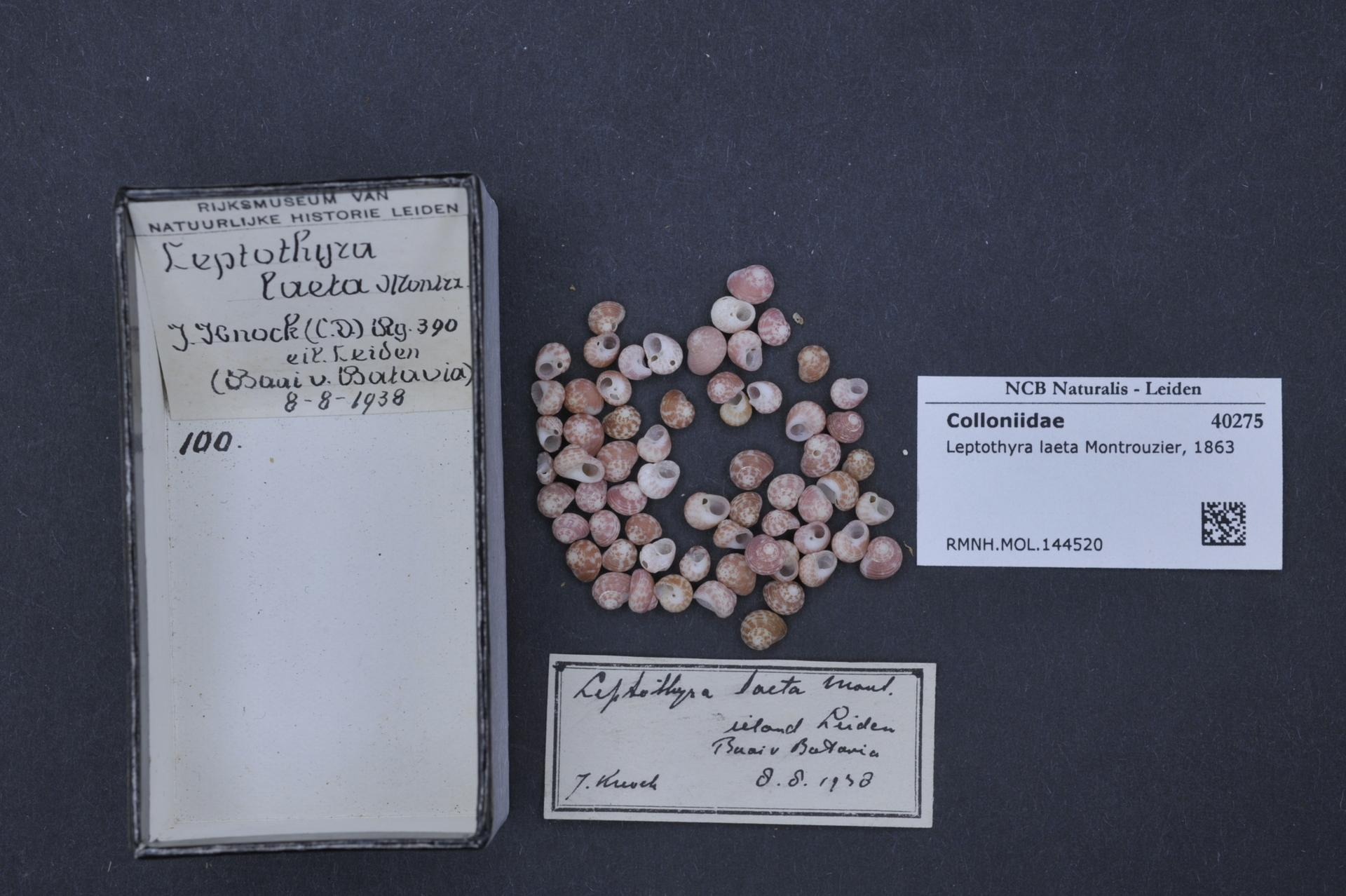
- Artiscollonia granulosa shells

Scientific classification
- Kingdom: Animalia
- Phylum: Mollusca
- Class: Gastropoda
- Subclass: Vetigastropoda
- Order: Trochida
- Family: Colloniidae
- Genus: Artiscollonia
- Species: A. granulosa

Binomial name
- Artiscollonia granulosa (Pease, 1868)

Synonyms
- Collonia laeta Montrouzier, R.P. in Souverbie, S.M. & R.P. Montrouzier, 1863; Leptothyra laeta (Montrouzier in Souverbie & Montrouzier, 1863); Turbo laetus Montrouzier in Souverbie & Montrouzier, 1863

= Artiscollonia granulosa =

Species of gastropod

Artiscollonia granulosa is a species of small sea snail with calcareous opercula, a marine gastropod mollusk in the family Colloniidae.

== Distribution ==
This marine species occurs in Indo-Malaysia and Oceania.
