= Latirulus =

Scientific classification
- Kingdom: Animalia
- Phylum: Mollusca
- Class: Gastropoda
- Subclass: Caenogastropoda
- Order: Neogastropoda
- Family: Fasciolariidae
- Genus: Latirulus; Cossmann, 1889

Genus of gastropods

Latirulus is a genus of sea snails, marine gastropod mollusks in the family Fasciolariidae, the spindle snails, the tulip snails and their allies.

== Species ==
Species within the genus Latirulus include:

- Latirulus craticulatus (Linnaeus, 1758): synonym of Turrilatirus craticulatus)
- Latirulus fasciatus Habe & Okutani, 1968
- Latirulus melvilli (Schepman, 1911): synonym of Turrilatirus melvilli
- Latirulus nagasakiensis (Smith, 1880): synonym of Turrilatirus nagasakiensis (E.A. Smith, 1880)
- Latirulus turrita (Gmelin, 1791): synonym of Turrilatirus turritus (Gmelin, 1791)
