= Provanna shinkaiae =

Scientific classification
- Kingdom: Animalia
- Phylum: Mollusca
- Class: Gastropoda
- Subclass: Caenogastropoda
- Order: incertae sedis
- Family: Provannidae
- Genus: Provanna
- Species: P. shinkaiae

Binomial name
- Provanna shinkaiae Okutani & Fujikura, 2002

Species of gastropod

Provanna shinkaiae is a species of sea snail, a marine gastropod mollusk in the family Provannidae.

== Distribution ==
This abyssal species occurs on the slope of the Japan Trench.

== Bibliography ==
- Okutani T. & Fujikura K. 2002. Abyssal gastropods and bivalves collected by Shinkai 6500 on slope of the Japan Trench. Venus, 60(4): 211–224
