= Provanna glabra =

Scientific classification
- Kingdom: Animalia
- Phylum: Mollusca
- Class: Gastropoda
- Subclass: Caenogastropoda
- Order: incertae sedis
- Family: Provannidae
- Genus: Provanna
- Species: P. glabra

Binomial name
- Provanna glabra Okutani, Tsuchida & Fujikura, 1992

Species of gastropod

Provanna glabra is a species of sea snail, a marine gastropod mollusk in the family Provannidae.

== Distribution ==
Provanna glabra lives in the Northwest Pacific. The most sightings have been reported in Japan, but it has also been found in Taiwan.
