= Provanna abyssalis =

Scientific classification
- Kingdom: Animalia
- Phylum: Mollusca
- Class: Gastropoda
- Subclass: Caenogastropoda
- Order: incertae sedis
- Family: Provannidae
- Genus: Provanna
- Species: P. abyssalis

Binomial name
- Provanna abyssalis Okutani & Fujikura, 2002

Species of gastropod

Provanna abyssalis is a species of abyssal sea snail, a marine gastropod mollusk in the family Provannidae.

== Distribution ==
This deep-water species occurs off Japan.
