= Provanna nassariaeformis =

Conservation status
- Near Threatened (IUCN 3.1)

Scientific classification
- Kingdom: Animalia
- Phylum: Mollusca
- Class: Gastropoda
- Subclass: Caenogastropoda
- Order: incertae sedis
- Family: Provannidae
- Genus: Provanna
- Species: P. nassariaeformis

Binomial name
- Provanna nassariaeformis Okutani, 1990

Species of gastropod

Provanna nassariaeformis is a species of sea snail, a marine gastropod mollusk in the family Provannidae.
