= Desbruyeresia marisindica =

Conservation status
- Endangered (IUCN 3.1)

Scientific classification
- Kingdom: Animalia
- Phylum: Mollusca
- Class: Gastropoda
- Subclass: Caenogastropoda
- Order: incertae sedis
- Family: Provannidae
- Genus: Desbruyeresia
- Species: D. marisindica

Binomial name
- Desbruyeresia marisindica Okutani, Hashimoto & Sasaki, 2004

Species of gastropod

Desbruyeresia marisindica is a species of sea snail, a marine gastropod mollusk in the family Provannidae.

The specific name marisindica is from the Latin language word mare that means "sea" and from the Latin word indica that means "Indian" referring to the Indian Ocean, where the species lives.

== Distribution ==
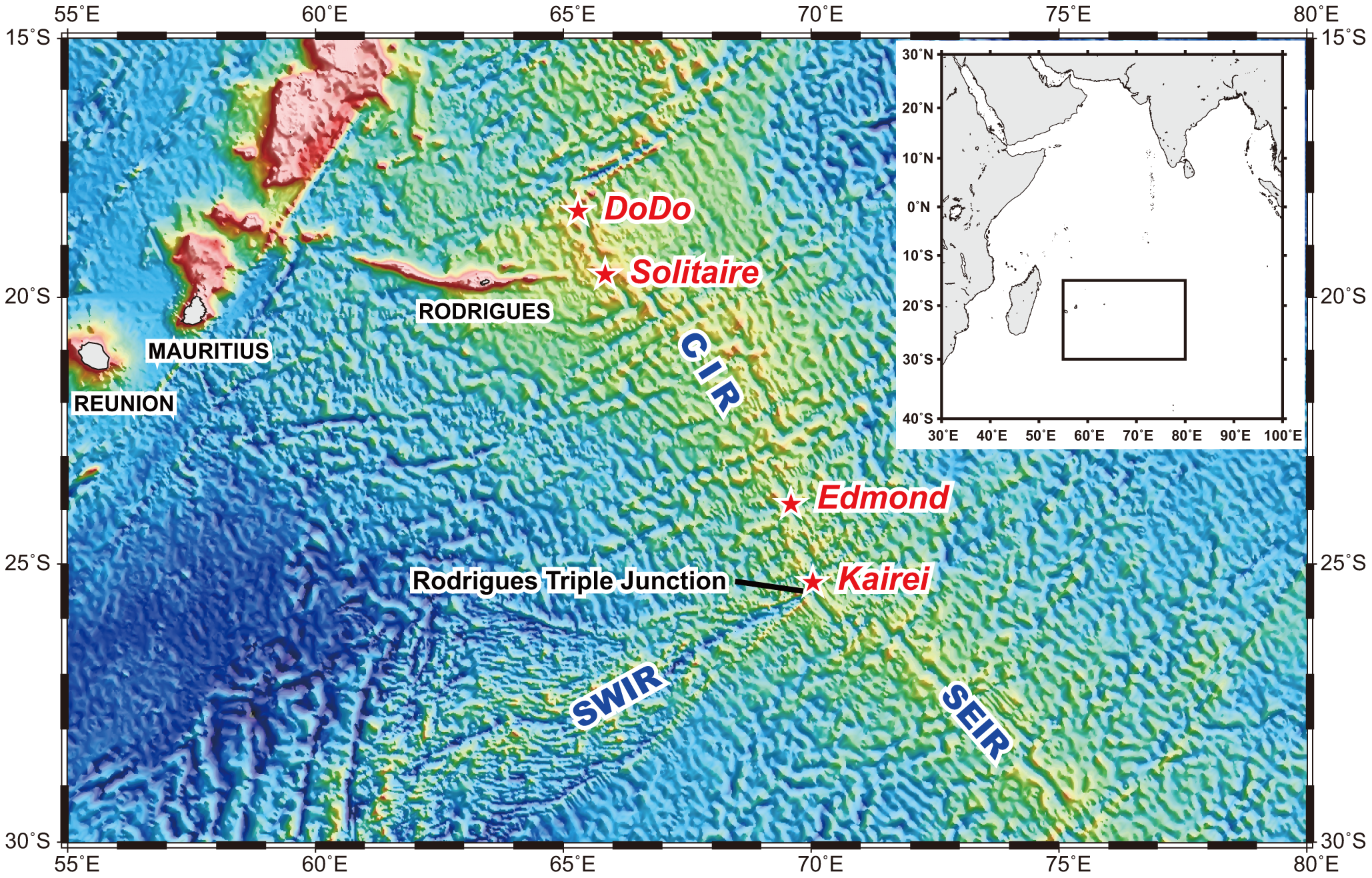
Map of southern part of the Central Indian Ridge (CIR) showing location of the Kairei hydrothermal vent site.

The type locality is the Kairei hydrothermal vent site on the Central Indian Ridge, just north of the Rodrigues Triple Point.
