= Provanna lomana =

Scientific classification
- Kingdom: Animalia
- Phylum: Mollusca
- Class: Gastropoda
- Subclass: Caenogastropoda
- Order: incertae sedis
- Family: Provannidae
- Genus: Provanna
- Species: P. lomana

Binomial name
- Provanna lomana (Dall, 1918)

Synonyms
- Trichotropis lomana Dall, 1918

Species of gastropod

Provanna lomana is a species of sea snail, a marine gastropod mollusk in the family Provannidae.

== Distribution ==
This marine species occurs off Point Loma, San Diego County, California, in seeps, vents and whale-falls.
