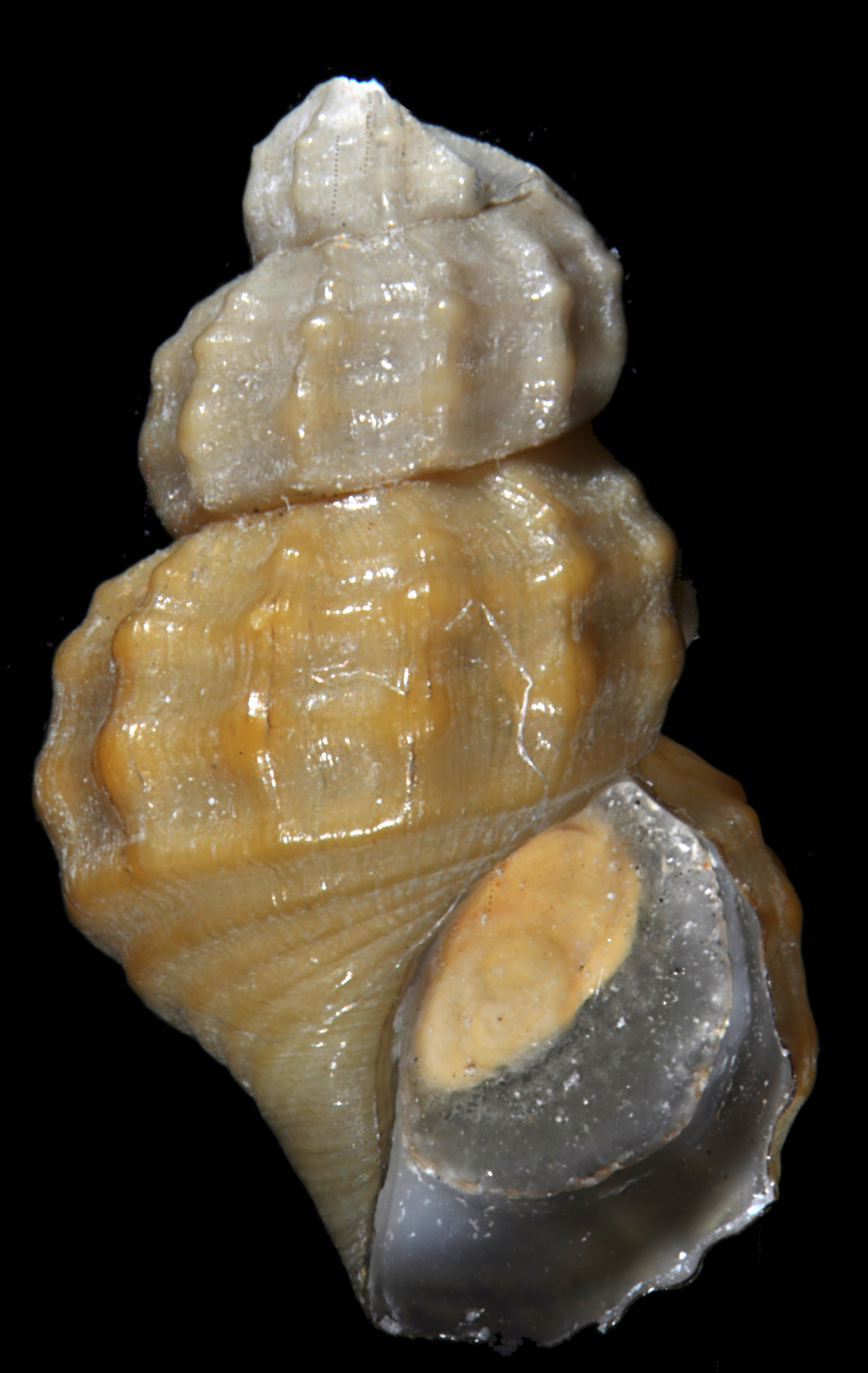
- Shell of Provanna segonzaci (holotype at MNHN, Paris)

Conservation status
- Critically Endangered (IUCN 3.1)

Scientific classification
- Kingdom: Animalia
- Phylum: Mollusca
- Class: Gastropoda
- Subclass: Caenogastropoda
- Order: incertae sedis
- Family: Provannidae
- Genus: Provanna
- Species: P. segonzaci

Binomial name
- Provanna segonzaci Warén & Ponder, 1991

= Provanna segonzaci =

Species of gastropod

Provanna segonzaci is a species of sea snail, a marine gastropod mollusk in the family Provannidae.

== Distribution ==
This marine species occurs in hydrothermal vents off the Valufa Ridge, southeast of Fiji.
