= Desbruyeresia cancellata =

Conservation status
- Vulnerable (IUCN 3.1)

Scientific classification
- Kingdom: Animalia
- Phylum: Mollusca
- Class: Gastropoda
- Subclass: Caenogastropoda
- Order: incertae sedis
- Family: Provannidae
- Genus: Desbruyeresia
- Species: D. cancellata

Binomial name
- Desbruyeresia cancellata Warén & Bouchet, 1993

Species of gastropod

Desbruyeresia cancellata is a species of sea snail, a marine gastropod mollusk in the family Provannidae.
