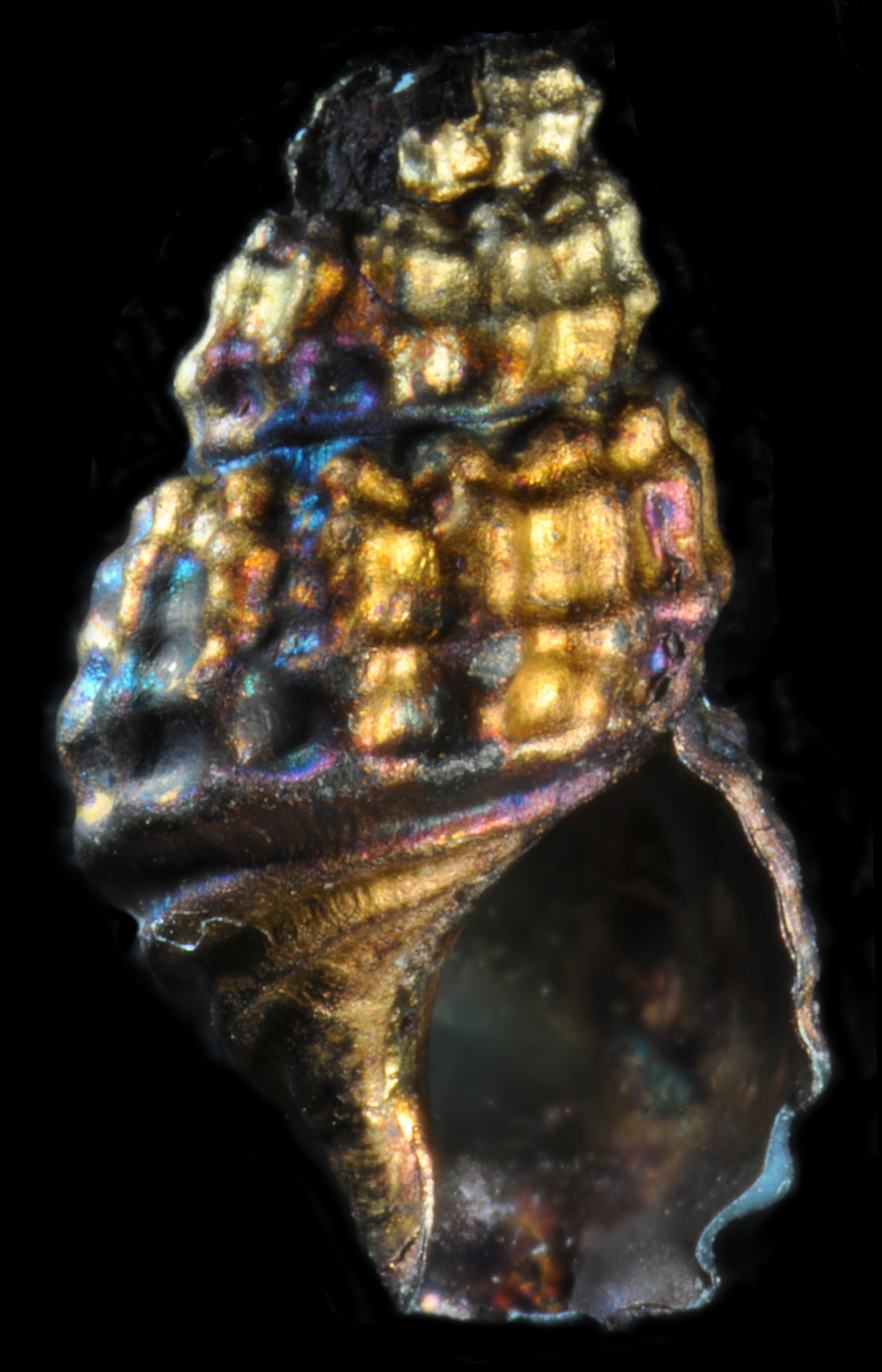

Scientific classification
- Kingdom: Animalia
- Phylum: Mollusca
- Class: Gastropoda
- Subclass: Caenogastropoda
- Order: incertae sedis
- Family: Provannidae
- Genus: Provanna
- Species: P. sculpta

Binomial name
- Provanna sculpta Warén & Ponder, 1991

= Provanna sculpta =

Species of gastropod

Provanna sculpta is a species of sea snail, a marine gastropod mollusk in the family Provannidae.

== Distribution ==
This species occurs in the Gulf of Mexico, off Louisiana.

== Description ==
The maximum recorded shell length is 7.1 mm.

== Habitat ==
Minimum recorded depth is 576 m. Maximum recorded depth is 576 m.
