= Provanna variabilis =

Scientific classification
- Kingdom: Animalia
- Phylum: Mollusca
- Class: Gastropoda
- Subclass: Caenogastropoda
- Order: incertae sedis
- Family: Provannidae
- Genus: Provanna
- Species: P. variabilis

Binomial name
- Provanna variabilis Warén & Bouchet, 1986

Species of gastropod

Provanna variabilis is a species of sea snail, a marine gastropod mollusk in the family Provannidae.

== Distribution ==
This marine species occurs at hydrothermal vents off the Juan de Fuca Ridge, Northeast Pacific Ocean.
