= Calliostoma belauense =

Scientific classification
- Kingdom: Animalia
- Phylum: Mollusca
- Class: Gastropoda
- Subclass: Vetigastropoda
- Order: Trochida
- Family: Calliostomatidae
- Genus: Calliostoma
- Species: C. belauense

Binomial name
- Calliostoma belauense Okutani & Kurata, 1998

Synonyms
- Calliostoma belauensis Okutani & Kurata, 1998; Calliostoma (Fautor) belauensis Okutani, T.A. & Kurata, 1998

Species of gastropod

Calliostoma belauense is a species of sea snail, a marine gastropod mollusk in the family Calliostomatidae.

Some authors place this taxon in the subgenus Calliostoma (Fautor)

== Distribution ==
This species occurs in the Pacific Ocean off the Palau Islands.
