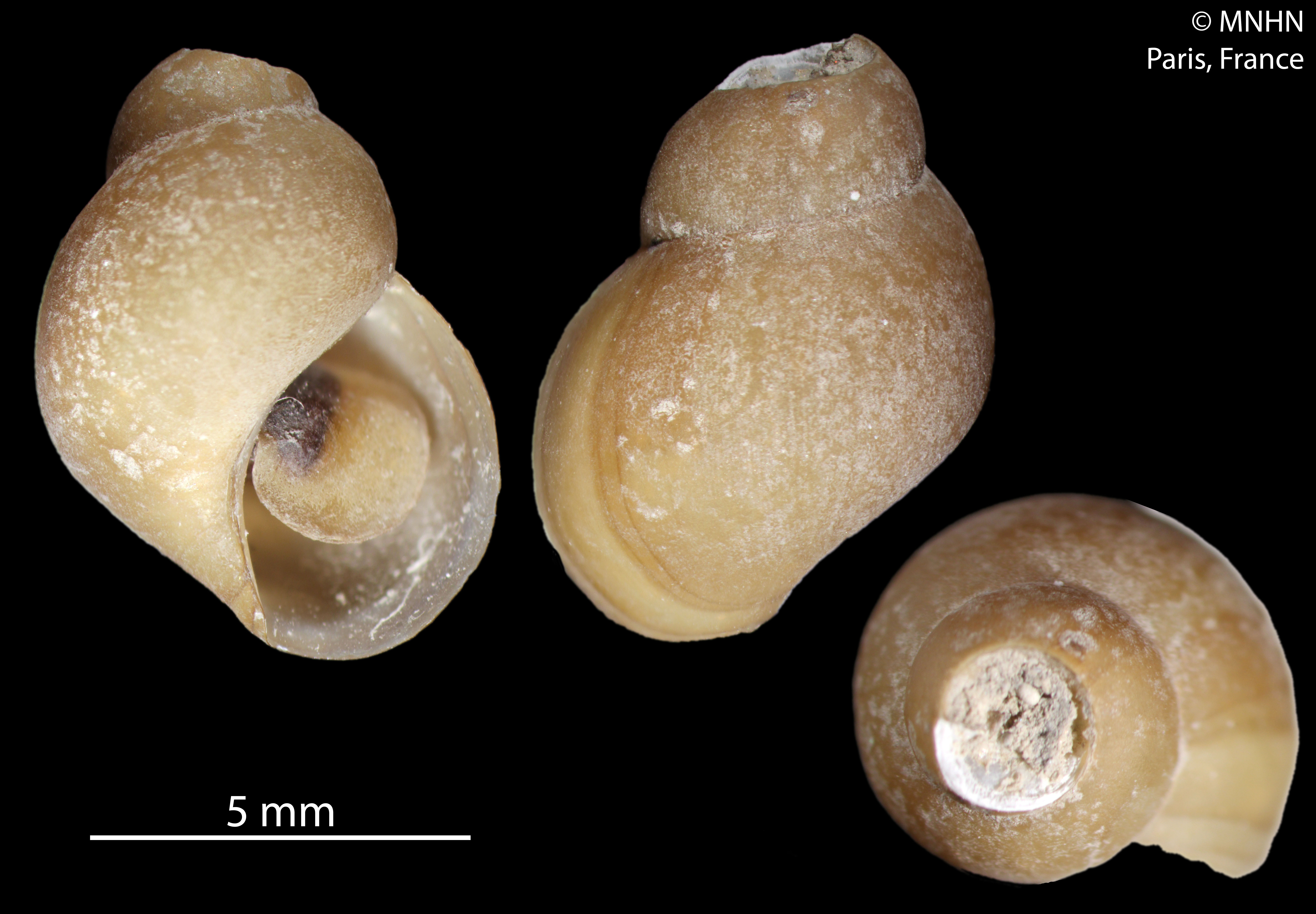
- Shell of Provanna laevis (paratype at MNHN, Paris)

Scientific classification
- Kingdom: Animalia
- Phylum: Mollusca
- Class: Gastropoda
- Subclass: Caenogastropoda
- Order: incertae sedis
- Family: Provannidae
- Genus: Provanna
- Species: P. laevis

Binomial name
- Provanna laevis Warén & Ponder, 1991

= Provanna laevis =

Species of gastropod

Provanna laevis is a species of sea snail, a marine gastropod mollusk in the family Provannidae.

== Distribution ==
This marine species occurs off the Guaymas Transform Ridge, Gulf of California, Western Mexico
