= Provanna pacifica =

Scientific classification
- Kingdom: Animalia
- Phylum: Mollusca
- Class: Gastropoda
- Subclass: Caenogastropoda
- Order: incertae sedis
- Family: Provannidae
- Genus: Provanna
- Species: P. pacifica

Binomial name
- Provanna pacifica (Dall, 1908)

Synonyms
- Trichotropis pacifica Dall, 1908

Species of gastropod

Provanna pacifica is a species of sea snail, a marine gastropod mollusk in the family Provannidae.
