= Alvania flava =

Scientific classification
- Kingdom: Animalia
- Phylum: Mollusca
- Class: Gastropoda
- Subclass: Caenogastropoda
- Order: Littorinimorpha
- Superfamily: Rissooidea
- Family: Rissoidae
- Genus: Alvania
- Species: A. flava

Binomial name
- Alvania flava Okutani, 1964

Species of gastropod

Alvania flava is a species of minute sea snail, a marine gastropod mollusk or micromollusk in the family Rissoidae.

== Description ==
The length of the shell varies between 0.6 mm and 3 mm.

== Distribution ==
This species occurs in Sea of Japan; also off the Philippines and the Kuriles, Russia.
