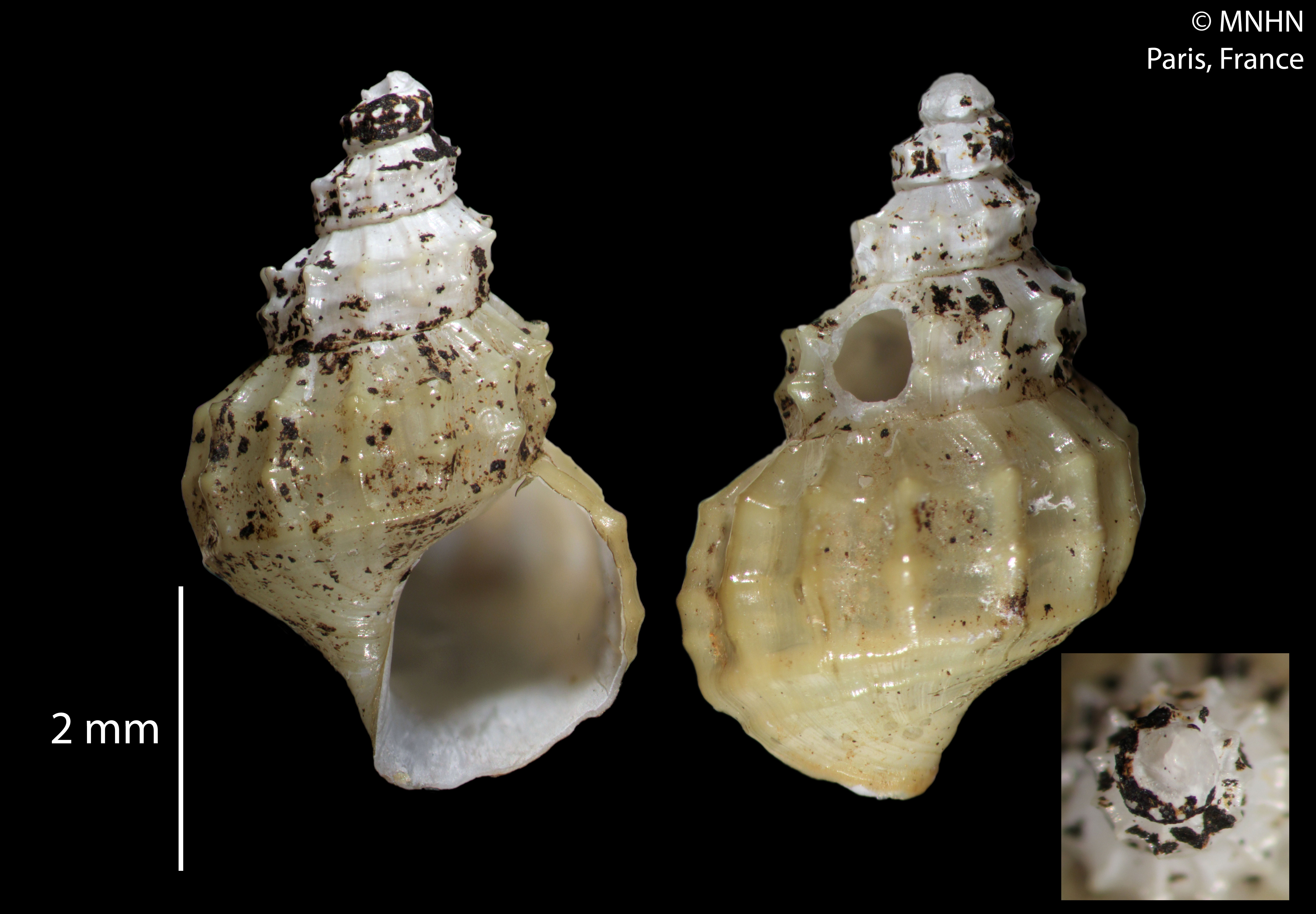
- Shell of Provanna goniata (paratype at MNHN, Paris)

Scientific classification
- Kingdom: Animalia
- Phylum: Mollusca
- Class: Gastropoda
- Subclass: Caenogastropoda
- Order: incertae sedis
- Family: Provannidae
- Genus: Provanna
- Species: P. goniata

Binomial name
- Provanna goniata Warén & Bouchet, 1986

= Provanna goniata =

Species of gastropod

Provanna goniata is a species of deep-sea sea snail, a marine gastropod mollusk in the family Provannidae.

== Distribution ==
This marine species occurs in East Pacific hydrothermal vents in the Guyamas Transform Ridge
