= Provanna ios =

Conservation status
- Near Threatened (IUCN 3.1)

Scientific classification
- Kingdom: Animalia
- Phylum: Mollusca
- Class: Gastropoda
- Subclass: Caenogastropoda
- Order: incertae sedis
- Family: Provannidae
- Genus: Provanna
- Species: P. ios

Binomial name
- Provanna ios Warén & Bouchet, 1986

Species of gastropod

Provanna ios is a species of deep-sea sea snail, a marine gastropod mollusk in the family Provannidae.

== Distribution ==
This species occurs in East Pacific hydrothermal vents at the Galapagos Rift.
