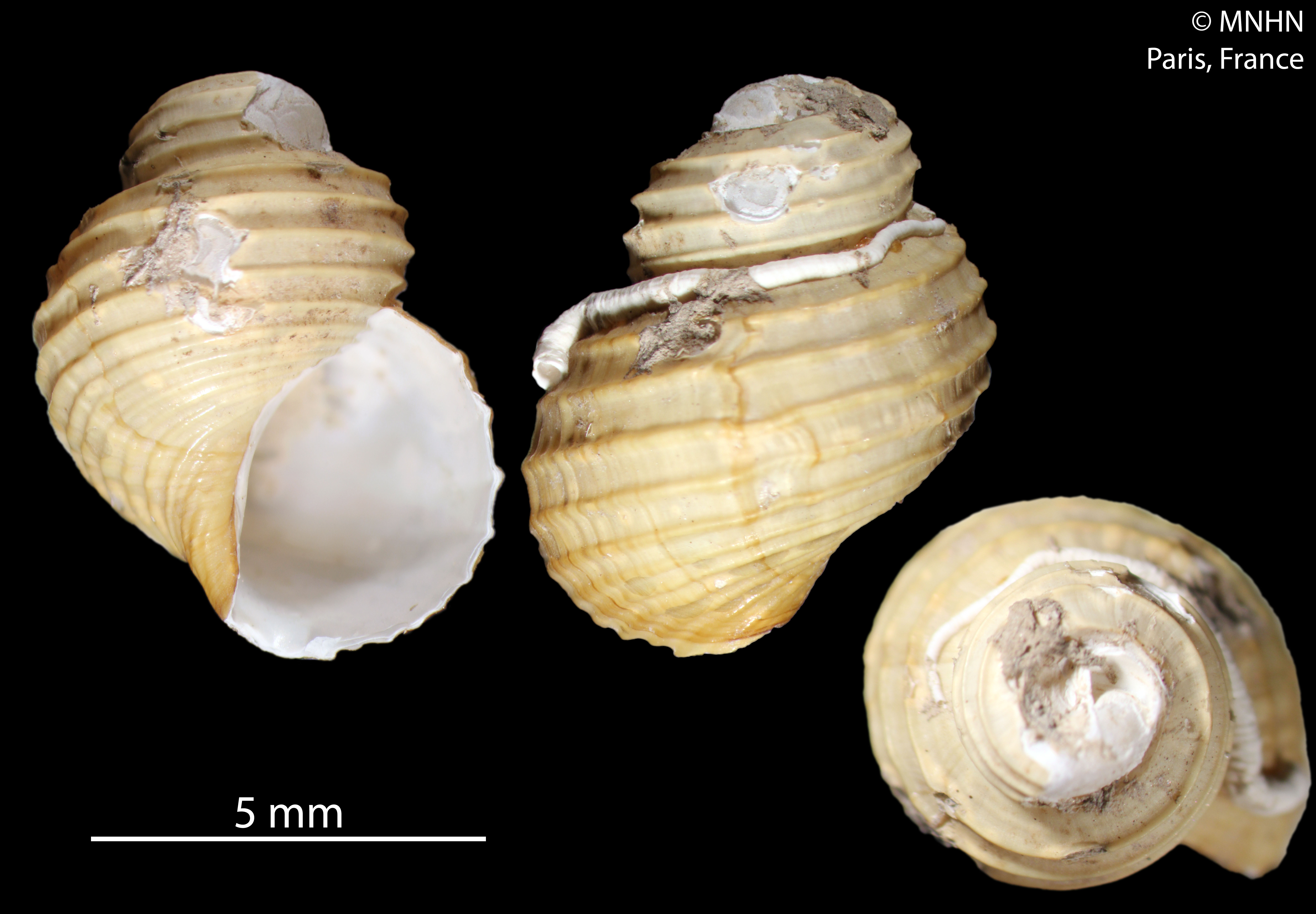
- Shell of Provanna macleani (paratype at MNHN, Paris)

Scientific classification
- Kingdom: Animalia
- Phylum: Mollusca
- Class: Gastropoda
- Subclass: Caenogastropoda
- Order: incertae sedis
- Family: Provannidae
- Genus: Provanna
- Species: P. macleani

Binomial name
- Provanna macleani Warén & Bouchet, 1989

= Provanna macleani =

Species of gastropod

Provanna macleani is a species of sea snail, a marine gastropod mollusk in the family Provannidae.

== Distribution ==
This species occurs near East Pacific hydrothermal vents
