= Latirulus fasciatus =

Scientific classification
- Kingdom: Animalia
- Phylum: Mollusca
- Class: Gastropoda
- Subclass: Caenogastropoda
- Order: Neogastropoda
- Family: Fasciolariidae
- Genus: Latirulus
- Species: L. fasciatus

Binomial name
- Latirulus fasciatus Habe & Okutani, 1968

Species of gastropod

Latirulus fasciatus is a species of sea snail, a marine gastropod mollusc in the family Fasciolariidae, the spindle snails, the tulip snails and their allies.

== Description ==
The snails are small, with their shells averaging 60 millimeters long. The shells can be white, with thin brown stripes going around the circumference of their shells, or a mottled brown. They live in island areas in the Pacific Ocean, such as in Hawaii or Japan.
