= Provanna chevalieri =

Scientific classification
- Kingdom: Animalia
- Phylum: Mollusca
- Class: Gastropoda
- Subclass: Caenogastropoda
- Order: incertae sedis
- Family: Provannidae
- Genus: Provanna
- Species: P. chevalieri

Binomial name
- Provanna chevalieri Warén & Bouchet, 2009

Species of gastropod

Provanna chevalieri is a species of sea snail, a marine gastropod mollusk in the family Provannidae.

== Description & Characteristics ==
Provanna chevalieri is a species of gastropod in the family Provannidae. It is known for its unique shell morphology which includes a slender, elongated shape and distinct patterns.

== Habitat & Distribution ==
Provanna chevalieri is typically found in hydrothermal vent ecosystems in the deep sea. These environments are characterized by extreme conditions, including high pressure, high temperature, and the presence of toxic chemicals. This species commonly occurs at methane seeps in deep water off the Congo River.

== Ecology & Behaviour ==
This species is adapted to survive in harsh deep-sea conditions. It has specialized feeding mechanisms that allow it to utilize the unique resources available in hydrothermal vent habitats.

== Discovery and Taxonomy ==
Provanna chevalieri was first described by Warén and Bouchet in 1989 based on specimens collected from hydrothermal vents in the Pacific Ocean. Its taxonomic classification has been refined through genetic and morphological studies.

== Conservation status ==
Currently, there is limited information on the conservation status of Provanna chevalieri. However, hydrothermal vent ecosystems face threats from deep-sea mining and climate change, which could impact species like P. chevalieri.
