= Turbonilla corgani =

Scientific classification
- Kingdom: Animalia
- Phylum: Mollusca
- Class: Gastropoda
- Family: Pyramidellidae
- Genus: Turbonilla
- Species: T. corgani

Binomial name
- Turbonilla corgani Okutani, 1968

Synonyms
- Turbonilla punicea Okutani, 1964

Species of gastropod

Turbonilla corgani is a species of sea snail, a marine gastropod mollusk in the family Pyramidellidae, the pyrams and their allies.
