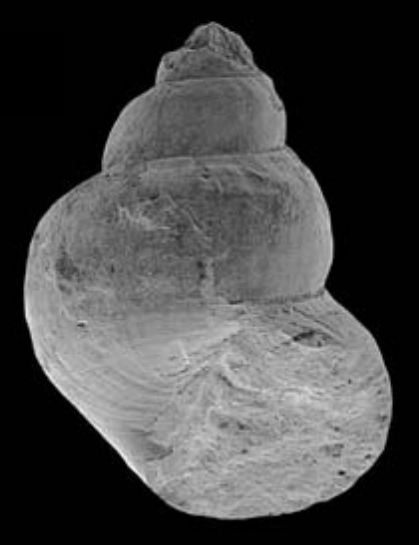
- Provanna hirokoae

Scientific classification
- Kingdom: Animalia
- Phylum: Mollusca
- Class: Gastropoda
- Subclass: Caenogastropoda
- Order: incertae sedis
- Superfamily: Abyssochrysoidea
- Family: Provannidae
- Genus: Provanna; Dall, 1918

Type species
- Trichotropis (Provanna) lomana Dall, 1918

Synonyms
- Trichotropis (Provanna) Dall, 1918 (original rank)

= Provanna =

Provanna Temporal range: Cretaceous-Recent

Genus of gastropods

Provanna is a genus of sea snails, marine gastropod mollusks in the family Provannidae.

This is a very old genus with species already existing in Cretaceous seep deposits off Japan (93 - 100 million years ago). The Caribbean and the Pacific fauna were isolated about 3 million years ago by the closure of the Central American Isthmus.

== Description ==
The apical whorls of the protoconch are lacking through decollation. The opening is then sealed with a calcareous plug. The sculpture of the ovate fusiform shell shows scattered sigmoidal axial ribs that are crossed by spiral cords. The whorls are broad.

== Habitat ==
They are common in hydrothermal vents, hydrocarbon cold seeps and (more rarely) on deep-water food-falls, depending on the species. Most species feed on filamentous bacteria, while others feed on detritus.

== Species ==
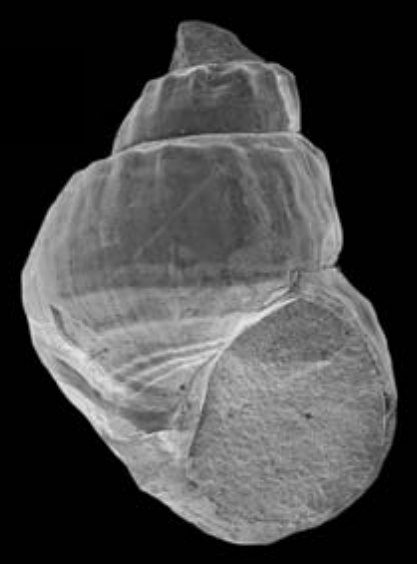
Provanna alexi

Species within the genus Provanna include:

- Provanna abyssalis Okutani & Fujikura, 2002
- Provanna admetoides Warén & Ponder, 1991
- † Provanna alexi Amano & Little, 2014
- † Provanna antiqua Squires, 1995
- † Provanna azurini Kiel, Aguilar & Kase, 2020
- Provanna beebei Linse, Nye, Copley & C. Chen, 2019
- Provanna buccinoides Warén & Bouchet, 1993
- Provanna chevalieri Warén & Bouchet, 2009
- Provanna cingulata C. Chen, Watanabe & Ohara, 2018
- Provanna clathrata Sasaki, Ogura, Watanabe & Fujikura, 2016
- Provanna cooki Linse, Nye, Copley & C. Chen, 2019
- Provanna fenestrata C. Chen, Watanabe & Sasaki, 2019
- † Provanna fortis Hybertsen & Kiel, 2018
- Provanna glabra Okutani, Tsuchida & Fujikura, 1992
- Provanna goniata Warén & Bouchet, 1986
- † Provanna hirokoae Amano & Little, 2014
- Provanna ios Warén & Bouchet, 1986
- Provanna kuroshimensis Sasaki, Ogura, Watanabe & Fujikura, 2016
- Provanna laevis Warén & Ponder, 1991
- Provanna lomana (Dall, 1918)
- Provanna lucida Sasaki, Ogura, Watanabe & Fujikura, 2016
- Provanna macleani Warén & Bouchet, 1989
- † Provanna marshalli Saether, Little & K. A. Campbell, 2010
- Provanna muricata Warén & Bouchet, 1986
- † Provanna nakagawaensis Kaim, Jenkins & Hikida, 2009
- Provanna nassariaeformis Okutani, 1990
- Provanna pacifica (Dall, 1908)
- † Provanna pelada Kiel, Hybertsen, Hyžný & Klompmaker, 2019
- Provanna reticulata Warén & Bouchet, 2009
- Provanna sculpta Warén & Ponder, 1991
- Provanna segonzaci Warén & Ponder, 1991
- Provanna shinkaiae Okutani & Fujikura, 2002
- Provanna stephanos C. Chen, Watanabe & Sasaki, 2019
- Provanna subglabra Sasaki, Ogura, Watanabe & Fujikura, 2016
- † Provanna tappuensis Kaim, Jenkins & Warén, 2008
- † Provanna urahoroensis Amano & Jenkins, 2013
- Provanna variabilis Warén & Bouchet, 1986

Several fossil species have been described, predominantly identified from hydrocarbon seep deposits (Saether et al., 2010), including:

- Provanna antiqua Squires & Goedert, 1995
- Provanna marshalli Saether, Little & Campbell, 2010
- Provanna nakagawaensis Kaim, Jenkins & Hikida, 2009
- Provanna tappuensis Kaim, Jenkins & Warén, 2008

There also are several fossil species known, but not formally described and named, from Central America, Japan, and possibly the Philippines (see Saether et al., 2010).

Species brought into synonymy

- Provanna marianensis Okutani & Fujikura, 1990: synonym of Desbruyeresia marianensis (Okutani & Fujikura, 1990)
