= Desbruyeresia marianensis =

Conservation status
- Vulnerable (IUCN 3.1)

Scientific classification
- Kingdom: Animalia
- Phylum: Mollusca
- Class: Gastropoda
- Subclass: Caenogastropoda
- Order: incertae sedis
- Family: Provannidae
- Genus: Desbruyeresia
- Species: D. marianensis

Binomial name
- Desbruyeresia marianensis (Okutani & Fujikura, 1990)

Synonyms
- Provanna marianensis Okutani & Fujikura, 1990

Species of gastropod

Desbruyeresia marianensis is a species of sea snail, a marine gastropod mollusk in the family Provannidae.

== Distribution ==
This marine species occurs in hydrothermal vents and seeps, Marianas Trench .
