= Provanna reticulata =

Scientific classification
- Kingdom: Animalia
- Phylum: Mollusca
- Class: Gastropoda
- Subclass: Caenogastropoda
- Order: incertae sedis
- Family: Provannidae
- Genus: Provanna
- Species: P. reticulata

Binomial name
- Provanna reticulata Warén & Bouchet, 2009

Species of gastropod

Provanna reticulata is a species of sea snail, a marine gastropod mollusk in the family Provannidae.

== Distribution ==
This species occurs at methane seeps in deep water off the Congo River.
