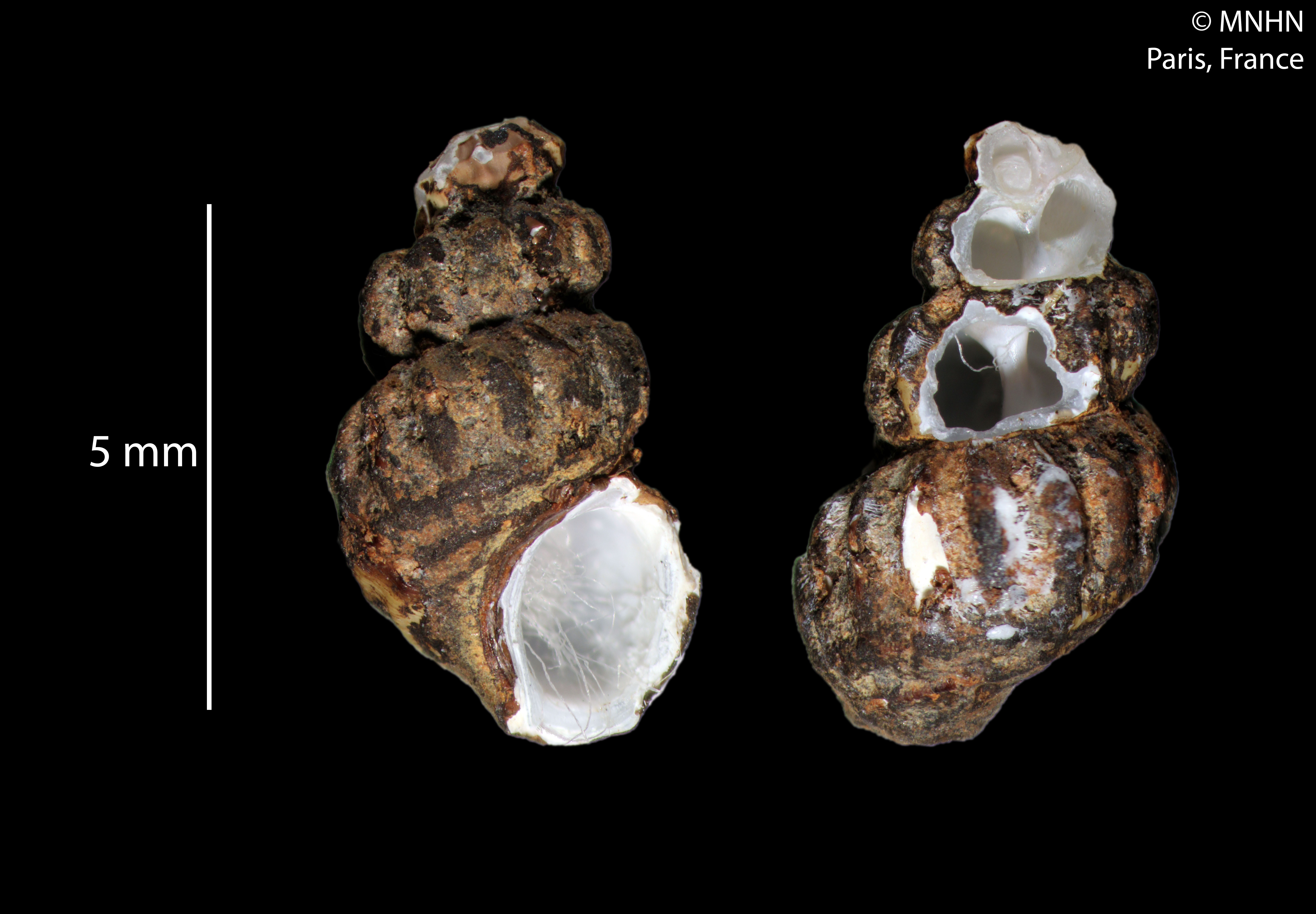
- Shell of Provanna muricata (paratype at MNHN, Paris)

Conservation status
- Near Threatened (IUCN 3.1)

Scientific classification
- Kingdom: Animalia
- Phylum: Mollusca
- Class: Gastropoda
- Subclass: Caenogastropoda
- Order: incertae sedis
- Family: Provannidae
- Genus: Provanna
- Species: P. muricata

Binomial name
- Provanna muricata Warén & Bouchet, 1986

= Provanna muricata =

Species of gastropod

Provanna muricata is a species of sea snail, a marine gastropod mollusk in the family Provannidae.

== Distribution ==
This species occurs in East Pacific hydrothermal vents at the Galapagos Rift.

== Bibliography ==
- Warén A. & Bouchet P., 1986. Four new species of Provanna Dall (Prosobranchia, Cerithiacea?) from East Pacific hydrothermal sites. Zoologica Scripta 15(2): 157-164
