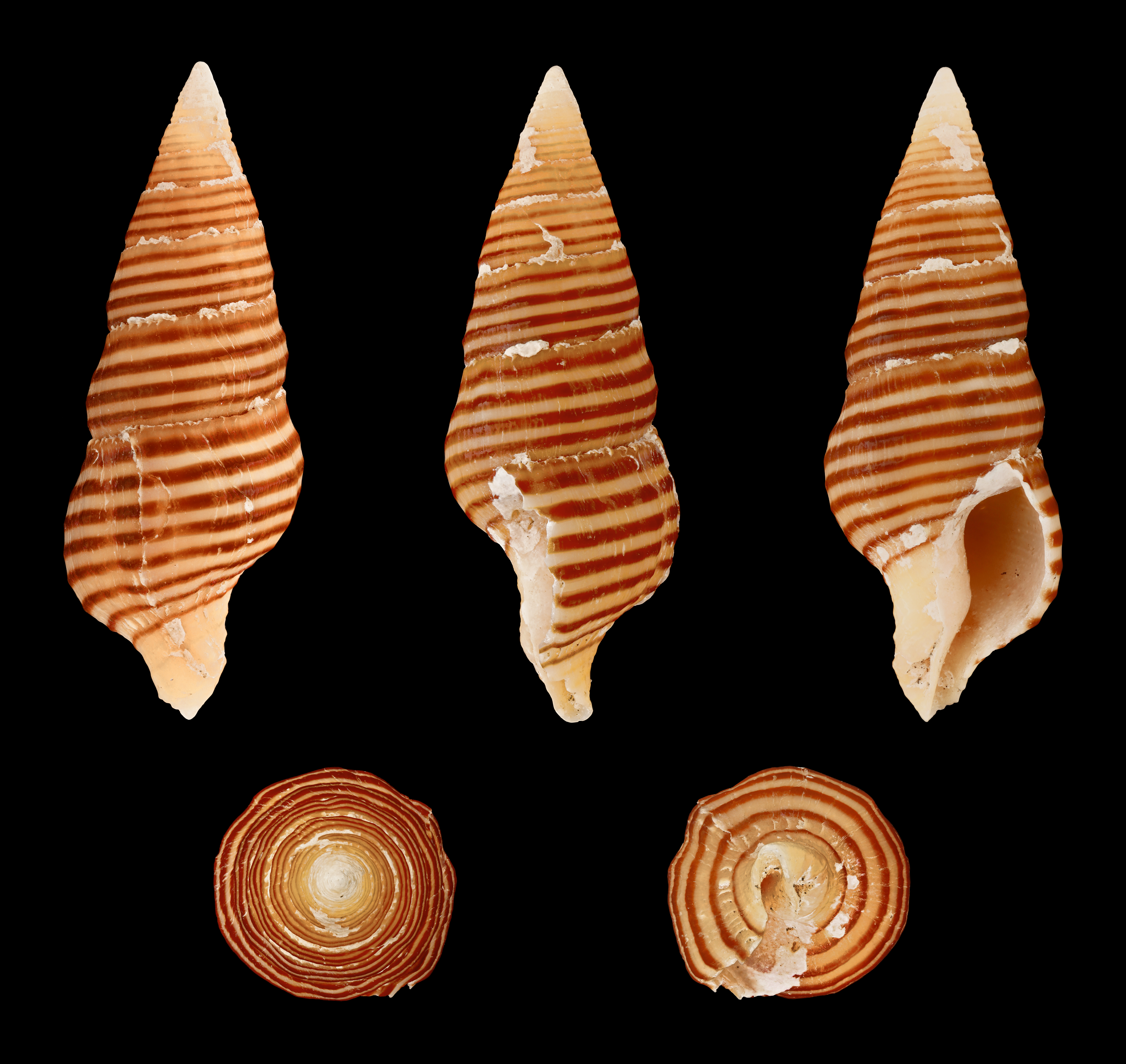
- Turrilatirus turritus (Gmelin, 1791)

Scientific classification
- Kingdom: Animalia
- Phylum: Mollusca
- Class: Gastropoda
- Subclass: Caenogastropoda
- Order: Neogastropoda
- Superfamily: Buccinoidea
- Family: Fasciolariidae
- Genus: Turrilatirus; Vermeij & M.A. Snyder, 2006

Type species
- Voluta turrita Gmelin, 1791

= Turrilatirus =

Genus of gastropods

Turrilatirus is a genus of sea snails, marine gastropod mollusks in the subfamily Fasciolariinae of the family Fasciolariidae, the spindle snails, the tulip snails and their allies.

== Species ==
Species within the genus Turrilatirus include:

- Turrilatirus craticulatus (Linnaeus, 1758)
- Turrilatirus iris (Lightfoot, 1786)
- Turrilatirus lautus (Reeve, 1847)
- Turrilatirus melvilli (Schepman, 1911)
- Turrilatirus nagasakiensis (E.A. Smith, 1880)
- † Turrilatirus patruelis (Bellardi, 1884)
- Turrilatirus sanguifluus (Reeve, 1847)
- Turrilatirus turritus (Gmelin, 1791)
