= Cordesia =

Scientific classification
- Kingdom: Animalia
- Phylum: Mollusca
- Class: Gastropoda
- Subclass: Caenogastropoda
- Order: incertae sedis
- Family: Provannidae
- Genus: Cordesia; Warén & Bouchet, 2009
- Species: C. provannoides

Binomial name
- Cordesia provannoides Warén & Bouchet, 2009

Species of gastropod

Cordesia provannoides is a species of sea snail, a marine gastropod mollusk in the family Provannidae.

Cordesia provannoides is the only species in the genus Cordesia.

== Distribution ==
This species was originally described from specimens collected at the cold seeps along the Florida Escarpment in the Gulf of Mexico. It also occurs at methane seeps in deep water off the Congo River.

Larvae of the Cordesia provannoides, or a very similar species, has been collected 0–100 m below the surface in the tropical East Atlantic overlying a total water depth of 4570 m.
