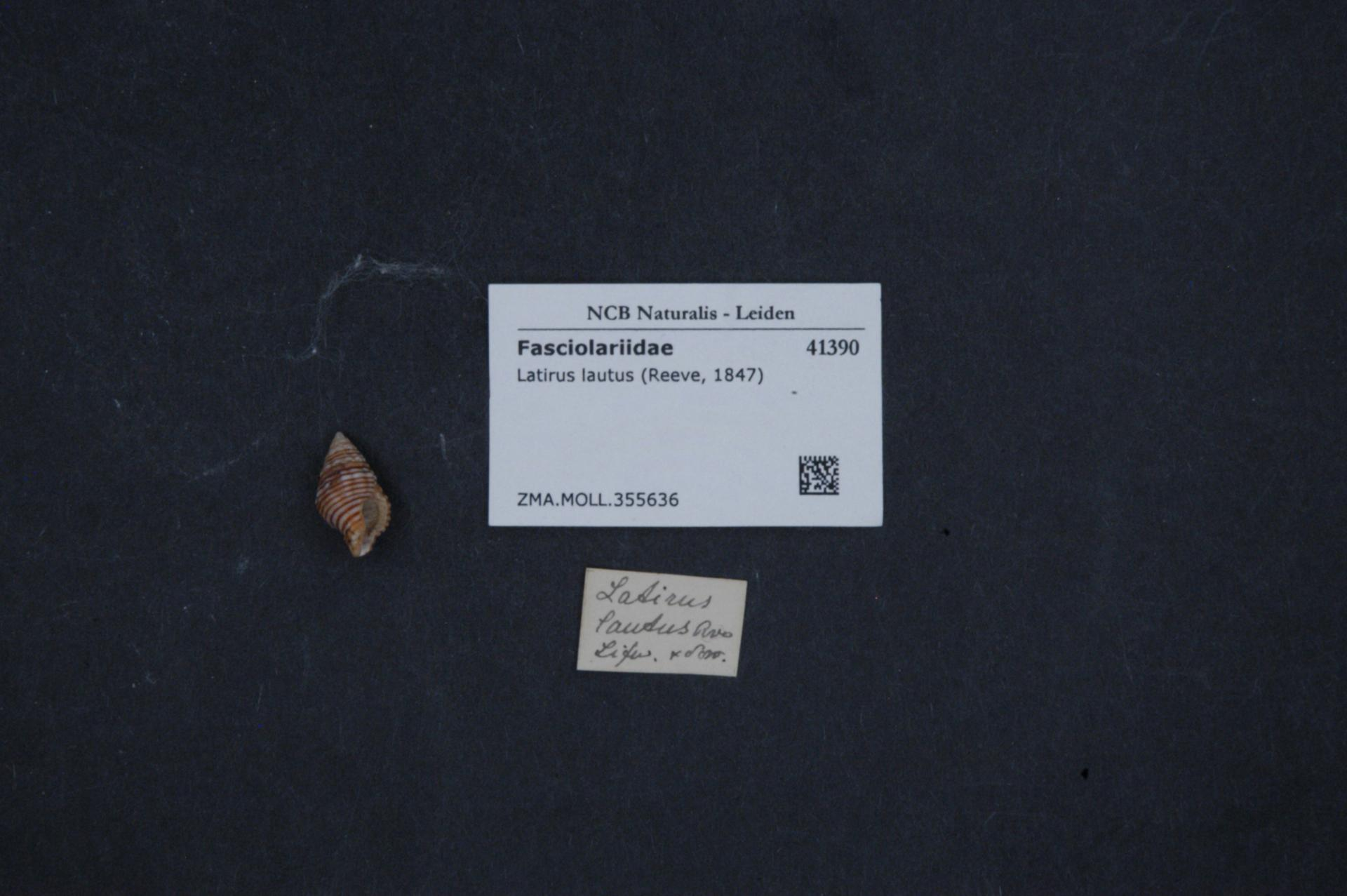

Scientific classification
- Kingdom: Animalia
- Phylum: Mollusca
- Class: Gastropoda
- Subclass: Caenogastropoda
- Order: Neogastropoda
- Family: Fasciolariidae
- Genus: Turrilatirus
- Species: T. lautus

Binomial name
- Turrilatirus lautus (Reeve, 1847)

Synonyms
- Latirus lautus (Reeve, 1847); Turbinella lauta Reeve, 1847

= Turrilatirus lautus =

Species of gastropod

Turrilatirus lautus is a species of sea snail, a marine gastropod mollusk in the family Fasciolariidae, the spindle snails, the tulip snails and their allies.
