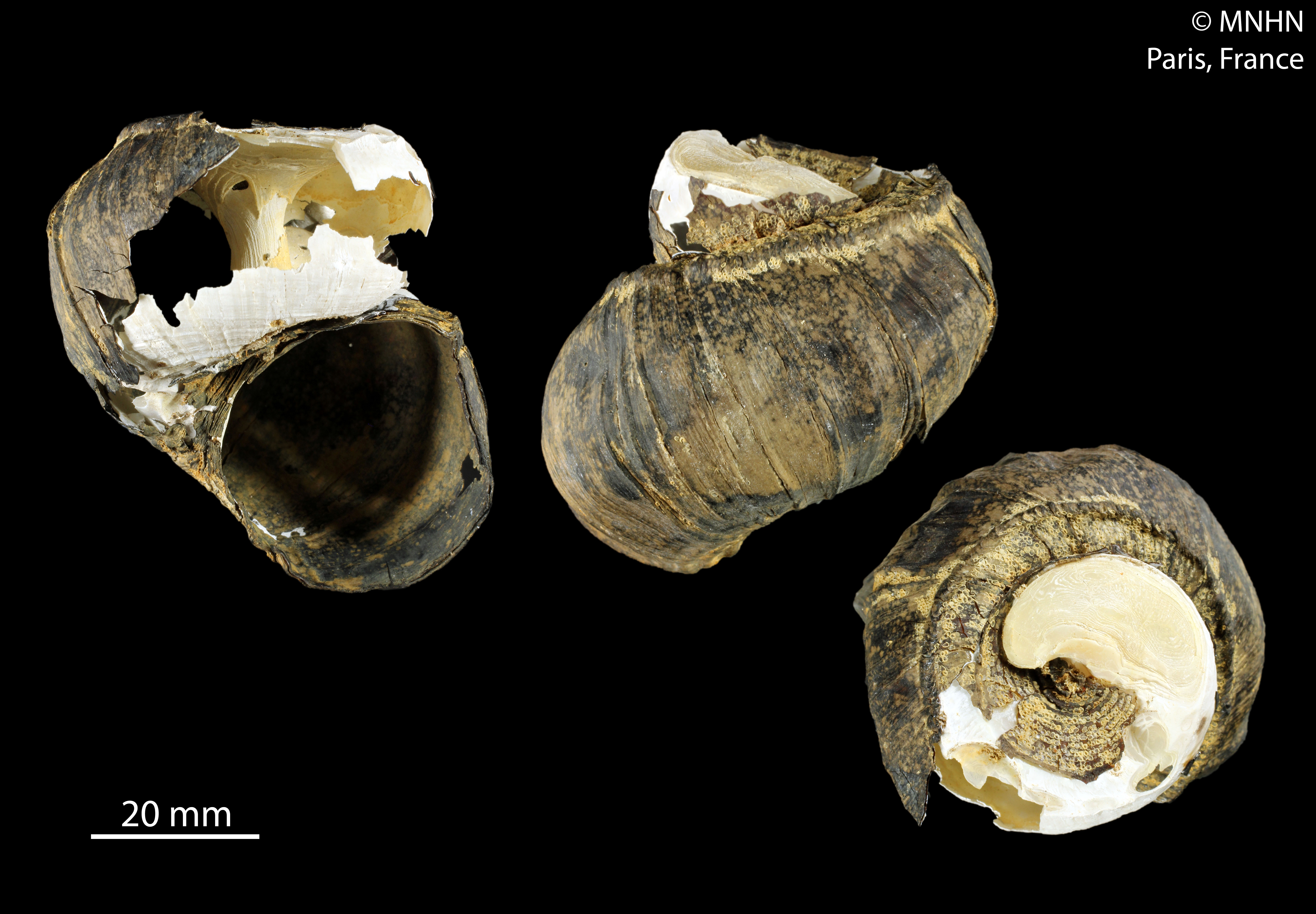
- Shell of Ifremeria nautilei (paratype at MNHN, Paris)

Conservation status
- Endangered (IUCN 3.1)

Scientific classification
- Kingdom: Animalia
- Phylum: Mollusca
- Class: Gastropoda
- Subclass: Caenogastropoda
- Order: incertae sedis
- Family: Paskentanidae
- Subfamily: Alviniconchinae
- Genus: Ifremeria
- Species: I. nautilei

Binomial name
- Ifremeria nautilei Bouchet & Warén, 1991

Synonyms
- Olgaconcha tufari L. Beck, 1991

= Ifremeria =

Species of gastropod

Ifremeria nautilei is a species of large, deepwater hydrothermal vent sea snail, a marine gastropod mollusk in the family Provannidae, and the only species in the genus Ifremeria. This species lives in the South Pacific Ocean

Other species in the family Provannidae live in similar deepwater hydrothermal vent habitats. As is the case in species in the genus Alviniconcha, the tissues of Ifremeria nautilei contain symbiotic bacteria which live on the sulfur from the vents, and the snails derive their nutrition from this symbiosis.

This species is particularly notable because the female snails have a brood pouch on the foot, and because they release a gastropod larval form which had never been observed and described before until 2008.

== Description ==
Ifremeria nautilei attains a maximum dimension of 85 mm, which is larger than other abyssochroids (length usually under 20 mm). This species hosts symbiotic chemoautotrophic bacteria that oxidize sulfur from hydrothermal vents. This arrangement enables it to satisfy most of its metabolic requirements.

This species is unique among the others in this superfamily in two respects. Firstly females of the species possess a brood pouch (a metapodial pedal gland) in the foot. Secondly the species releases unusual, previously unknown, uniformly ciliated lecithotrophic larvae, which are now known as Warén's larvae. These are free swimming larvae which swim with their posterior end forwards. They metamorphose after 15 days into shelled veliger larvae, the more usual form.

Warén's larva (named after Anders Warén of the Swedish Museum of Natural History), is the first new gastropod larval form to have been described in more than 100 years.

== Distribution ==
This species occurs at depths between 1,700 m and 2,900 m, in hydrothermal vents and hydrocarbon cold seeps in the Valufa Ridge, which is southeast of Fiji, in the South Pacific Ocean.
