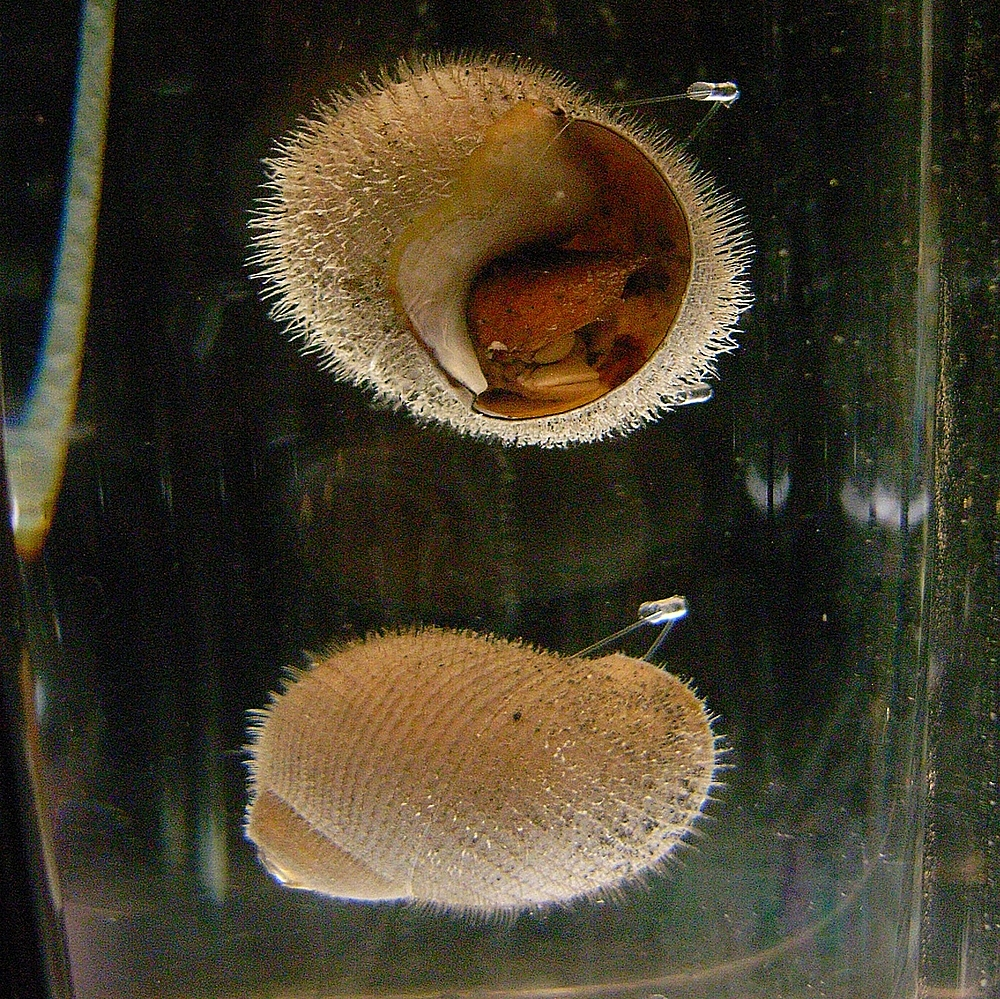
- Two preserved specimens of Alviniconcha hessleri

Scientific classification
- Kingdom: Animalia
- Phylum: Mollusca
- Class: Gastropoda
- Subclass: Caenogastropoda
- Order: incertae sedis
- Family: Paskentanidae
- Subfamily: Alviniconchinae
- Genus: Alviniconcha; Okutani & Ohta, 1988

Type species
- Alviniconcha hessleri Okutani & Ohta, 1988

Species
- Alviniconcha adamantis S. B. Johnson, Warén, Tunnicliffe, Van Dover, Wheat, T. F. Schultz & Vrijenhoek, 2014; Alviniconcha boucheti S. B. Johnson, Warén, Tunnicliffe, Van Dover, Wheat, T. F. Schultz & Vrijenhoek, 2014; Alviniconcha hessleri Okutani & Ohta, 1988; Alviniconcha kojimai S. B. Johnson, Warén, Tunnicliffe, Van Dover, Wheat, T. F. Schultz & Vrijenhoek, 2014; Alviniconcha marisindica Okutani, 2014; Alviniconcha strummeri S. B. Johnson, Warén, Tunnicliffe, Van Dover, Wheat, T. F. Schultz & Vrijenhoek, 2014

= Alviniconcha =

Genus of gastropods

Alviniconcha is a genus of deep water sea snails, marine gastropod mollusks in the family Paskentanidae. These snails are part of the fauna of the hydrothermal vents in the Indian and Western Pacific Ocean. These and another genus and species within the same family (Ifremeria nautilei) are the only known currently existing animals whose nutrition is derived from an endosymbiotic relationship with a member of bacteria from phylum Campylobacterota (formerly Epsilonproteobacteria) and Gammaproteobacteria, occurring as endosymbionts within the vacuoles of Alviniconcha ctenidia (or molluscan gills). All species of Alviniconcha are thought to be foundational species found near hydrothermal venting fluid supplying their bacterial endosymbionts with vent derived compounds such as hydrogen sulfide. These snails can withstand large variations in temperature (5–33 °C (41–91 °F)), pH, and chemical compositions.

== Description ==
The size of the shell varies between 20 mm (0.79 in) up to 60 mm (2.4 in) in height. The surface of the shell is studded with hairs on the periostracum, which ranges from a yellow/green to brown coloring. However, this thin periostracum is often missing or degraded due to high temperatures and chemical reductants found in nearby venting fluid. While Alviniconcha has been considered cryptic for many years, morphoanatomy studies on A. boucheti, A. kojimai, and A. strummeri have found distinguishing characteristics of the shell and head-foot regions. These three species are the only ones known to cohabitate vent fields, all other species are found in isolated basins in the NW Pacific and Indian Oceans. Morphoanatomy has not been studied for A. adamants, A. hessleri, or A. marisindica, thus shell variation or morphology does not yet correspond to individual species.

== Life History ==
Knowledge gaps remain in the life history of Alviniconcha, however adult shell anatomy resembles planktotrophic development. Unlike the sister genus Ifremeria whose development includes a novel "Waren's" larval form, held within a brood pouch (absent in Alviniconcha).

== Species ==
Until 2014, Alviniconcha consisted solely of the species Alviniconcha hessleri, described in 1988. In 2014, increased recognition of genetic differences between populations resulted in the formal description of five cryptic species within the former A. hessleri that were believed to be morphologically indistinguishable from each other but that have consistent differences in mitochondrial DNA sequences. New research also suggests distributions of Alviniconcha in the SW Pacific are linked to geochemical gradients and endosymbiont chemical requirements.

Species within the genus Alviniconcha include:

- Alviniconcha adamantis - found in the relatively shallow seamounts (less than 1,000 m (3,300 ft)) of the Mariana's Arc and hypothesized to be the ancestor of all other extant Alviniconcha species. Hosts gammaproteobacterial endosymbionts. S.B. Johnson, Warén, Tunnicliffe, Van Dover, Wheat, Schultz & Vrijenhoek, 2014
- Alviniconcha boucheti - found in hydrothermal vents in the Manus, Fiji, and Lau basins ranging from 1,300 to 2,700 m (4,300 to 8,900 ft) in depth. Hosts epsilon-proteobacterial endosymbionts. Named after deep sea gastropod scientist Philippe Bouchet. S.B. Johnson, Warén, Tunnicliffe, Van Dover, Wheat, Schultz & Vrijenhoek, 2014
- Alviniconcha hessleri - first Alviniconcha species to be described. Found at hydrothermal vents in the Mariana Trough at depths greater than 1,400 m (4,600 ft). Hosts gamma-proteobacterial endosymbionts. Most closely related to A. kojimai. Okutani & Ohta, 1988
- Alviniconcha kojimai - found at hydrothermal vents of the Manus, Fiji, and Lau Basins ranging from 1,480 to 2,700 m (4,860 to 8,860 ft) in depth. Hosts both epsilon- and gamma-proteobacterial endosymbionts. S.B. Johnson, Warén, Tunnicliffe, Van Dover, Wheat, Schultz & Vrijenhoek, 2014
- Alviniconcha marisindica - only Alviniconcha species found in the Indian Ocean, named by T. Okutani for the latin name for Indian Sea. Found specifically at vent sites on the Central Indian Ridge ranging from 2,400 to 330 m (7,870 to 1,080 ft) in depth. Hosts epsilon-proteobacterial endosymbionts. Okutani, 2014
- Alviniconcha strummeri - named after punk musician Joe Strummer of The Clash. Only found in the Southern Lau Basin, specifically at the Tui Mall vents sites at a depth of 1,850 m (6,070 ft). Hosts both gamma- and epsilon- proteobacterial endosymbionts. S.B. Johnson, Warén, Tunnicliffe, Van Dover, Wheat, Schultz & Vrijenhoek, 2014
