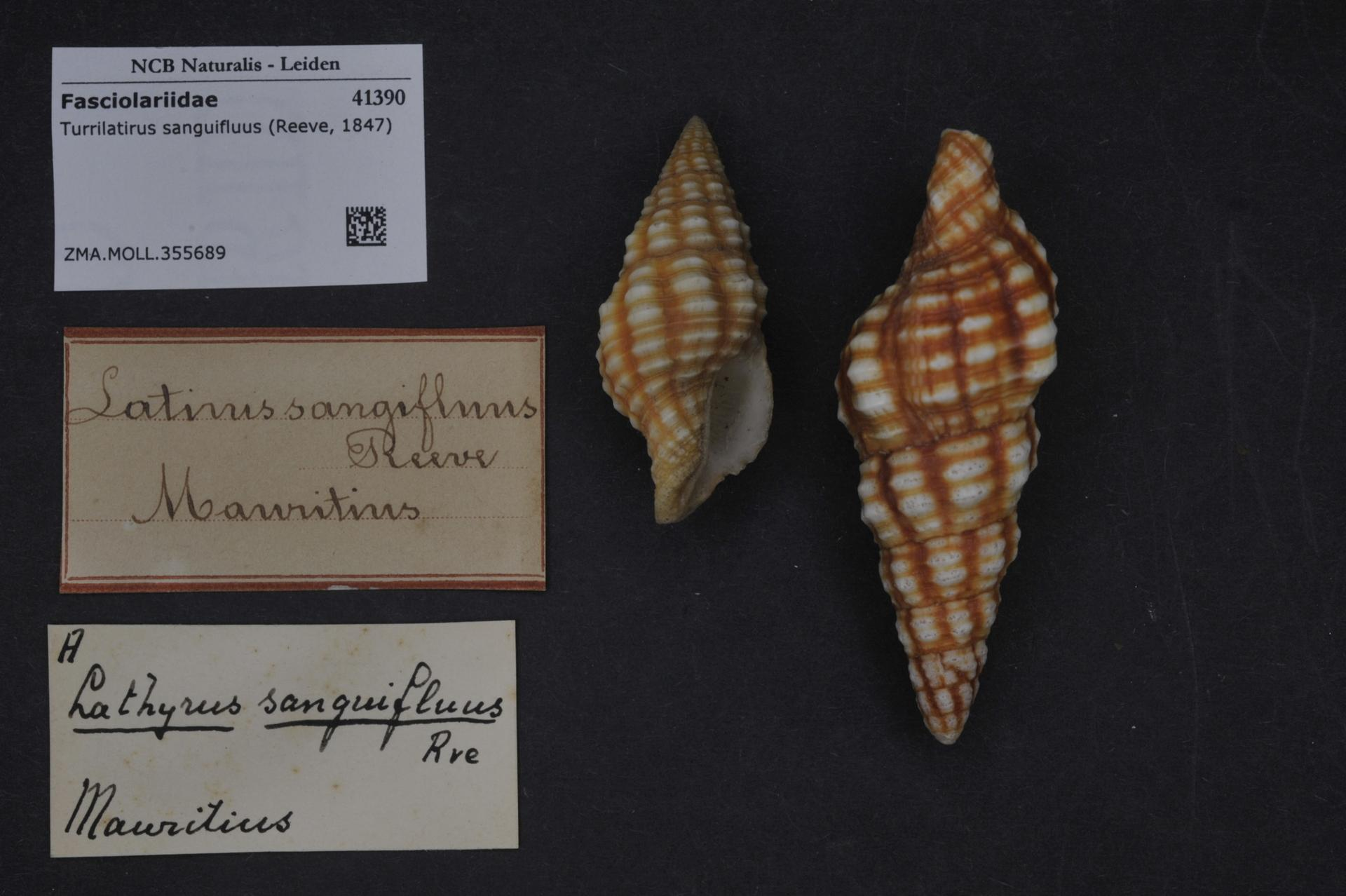

Scientific classification
- Kingdom: Animalia
- Phylum: Mollusca
- Class: Gastropoda
- Subclass: Caenogastropoda
- Order: Neogastropoda
- Family: Fasciolariidae
- Genus: Turrilatirus
- Species: T. sanguifluus

Binomial name
- Turrilatirus sanguifluus (Reeve, 1847)

Synonyms
- Turbinella sanguiflua Reeve, 1847; Latirus sanguiflua (Reeve, 1847)

= Turrilatirus sanguifluus =

Species of mollusc

Turrilatirus sanguifluus is a species of sea snail, a marine gastropod mollusk in the family Fasciolariidae, the spindle snails, the tulip snails and their allies.
