= Desbruyeresia =

Scientific classification
- Kingdom: Animalia
- Phylum: Mollusca
- Class: Gastropoda
- Subclass: Caenogastropoda
- Order: incertae sedis
- Family: Provannidae
- Genus: Desbruyeresia; Warén & Bouchet, 1993

Genus of gastropods

Desbruyeresia is a genus of sea snails, marine gastropod mollusks in the family Provannidae.

== Species ==
Species within the genus Desbruyeresia include:

- Desbruyeresia cancellata Warén & Bouchet, 1993
- Desbruyeresia marianensis (Okutani & Fujikura, 1990)
- Desbruyeresia marisindica Okutani, Hashimoto & Sasaki, 2004
- Desbruyeresia melanioides Warén & Bouchet, 1993
- Desbruyeresia spinosa Warén & Bouchet, 1993
