= Turrilatirus iris =

Scientific classification
- Kingdom: Animalia
- Phylum: Mollusca
- Class: Gastropoda
- Subclass: Caenogastropoda
- Order: Neogastropoda
- Family: Fasciolariidae
- Genus: Turrilatirus
- Species: T. iris

Binomial name
- Turrilatirus iris (Lightfoot, 1786)

Synonyms
- Buccinum iris Lightfoot, 1786; Latirus iris (Lightfoot, 1786)

Species of gastropod

Turrilatirus iris is a species of sea snail, a marine gastropod mollusk in the family Fasciolariidae, the spindle snails, the tulip snails and their allies.
