= Turrilatirus nagasakiensis =

Scientific classification
- Kingdom: Animalia
- Phylum: Mollusca
- Class: Gastropoda
- Subclass: Caenogastropoda
- Order: Neogastropoda
- Family: Fasciolariidae
- Genus: Turrilatirus
- Species: T. nagasakiensis

Binomial name
- Turrilatirus nagasakiensis (E.A. Smith, 1880)

Synonyms
- Latirulus nagasakiensis (E.A. Smith, 1880); Latirus nagasakiensis Smith, 1880

Species of gastropod

Turrilatirus nagasakiensis is a species of sea snail, a marine gastropod mollusk in the family Fasciolariidae, the spindle snails, the tulip snails and their allies.
