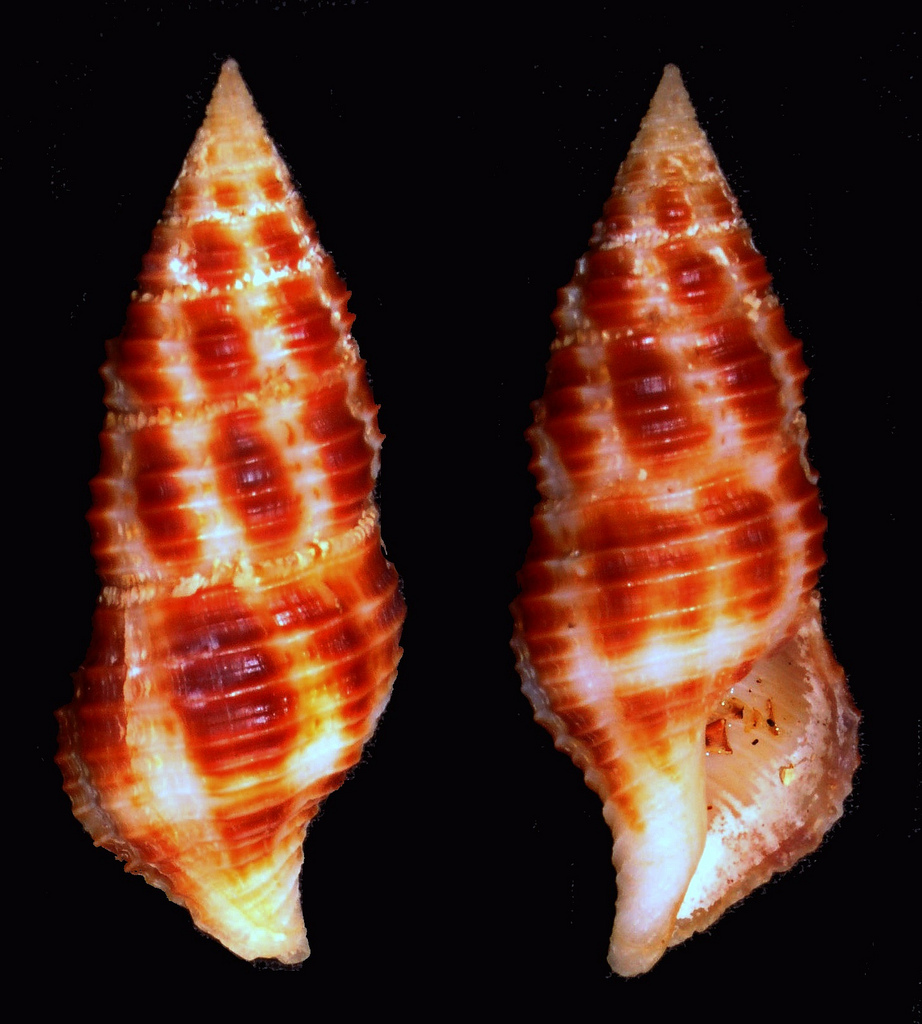
- Turrilatirus craticulatus

Scientific classification
- Kingdom: Animalia
- Phylum: Mollusca
- Class: Gastropoda
- Subclass: Caenogastropoda
- Order: Neogastropoda
- Family: Fasciolariidae
- Genus: Turrilatirus
- Species: T. craticulatus

Binomial name
- Turrilatirus craticulatus (Linnaeus, 1758)

Synonyms
- Latirulus craticulatus (Linnaeus, 1758); Latirus craticulatus (Linnaeus, 1758); Murex craticulatus Linnaeus, 1758

= Turrilatirus craticulatus =

Species of gastropod

Turrilatirus craticulatus is a species of sea snail, a marine gastropod mollusk in the family Fasciolariidae, the spindle snails, the tulip snails and their allies.
