= Turrilatirus melvilli =

Scientific classification
- Kingdom: Animalia
- Phylum: Mollusca
- Class: Gastropoda
- Subclass: Caenogastropoda
- Order: Neogastropoda
- Family: Fasciolariidae
- Genus: Turrilatirus
- Species: T. melvilli

Binomial name
- Turrilatirus melvilli (Schepman, 1911)

Synonyms
- Latirulus melvilli (Schepman, 1911); Latirus melvilli Schepman, 1911

Species of gastropod

Turrilatirus melvilli is a species of sea snail, a marine gastropod mollusk in the family Fasciolariidae, the spindle snails, the tulip snails and their allies.
