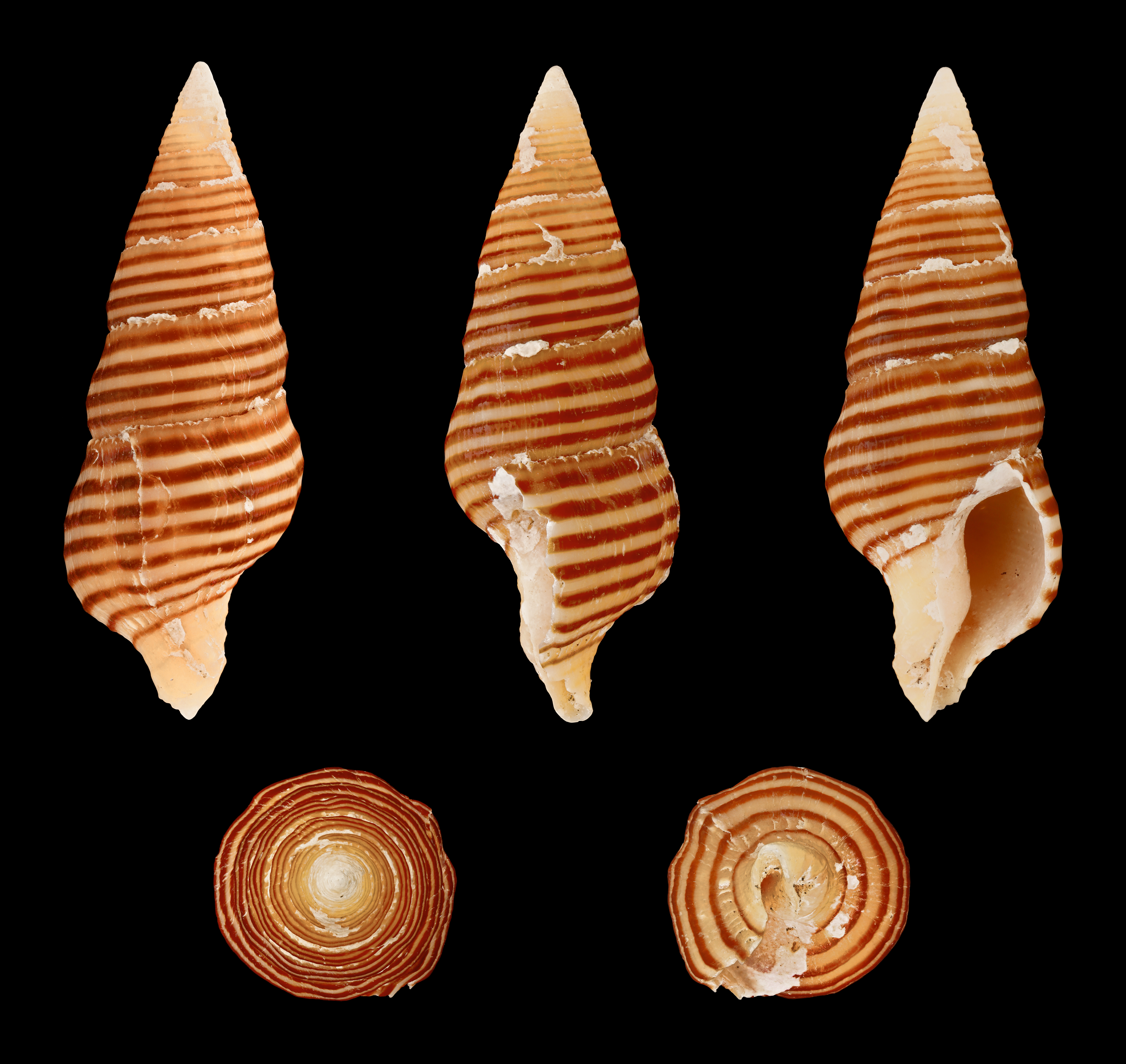

Scientific classification
- Kingdom: Animalia
- Phylum: Mollusca
- Class: Gastropoda
- Subclass: Caenogastropoda
- Order: Neogastropoda
- Family: Fasciolariidae
- Genus: Turrilatirus
- Species: T. turritus

Binomial name
- Turrilatirus turritus (Gmelin, 1791)

Synonyms
- Latirus turrita (Gmelin, 1791); Latirus turritus (Gmelin, 1791); Latirulus turritus (Gmelin, 1791); Voluta turrita Gmelin, 1791

= Turrilatirus turritus =

Species of mollusc

Turrilatirus turritus is a species of sea snail, a marine gastropod mollusk in the family Fasciolariidae, the spindle snails, the tulip snails and their allies.

== Description ==
The length of the shell attains 65 mm.

== Distribution ==
This marine species has a wide distribution: the Red Sea, Mozambique, South Africa, the Mascarenes, the Philippines, Indonesia, Sri Lanka, Japan, Australia, New Caledonia, Papua New Guinea, the Solomon Islands.
