= Takashi Okutani =

Japanese zoologist and malacologist (1931–2025)

- 奥谷喬司
- Born: 15 September 1931; Moji, Fukuoka Prefecture, Japan
- Died: 10 January 2025 (aged 93)
- Education: Tokyo University of Fisheries
- Known for: Research on marine molluscs, particularly cephalopods
- Scientific career
- Fields: Zoology, malacology
- Workplaces: National Museum of Nature and Science; Tokyo University of Fisheries; Nihon University

Takashi Okutani (奥谷 喬司, Okutani Takashi; 15 September 1931 – 10 January 2025) was a Japanese zoologist and malacologist. He was professor emeritus of the Tokyo University of Fisheries and specialised in the taxonomy, ecology and fisheries resources of molluscs. He served as president of the Malacological Society of Japan and was recognised for his contributions to the study of marine invertebrates, especially cephalopods.

== Biography ==
=== Early life and education ===
Okutani was born on 15 September 1931 in Moji, Fukuoka Prefecture, Japan, now part of Kitakyushu.

He graduated from the Department of Aquaculture at Tokyo University of Fisheries in 1954. In 1966, he received a Doctor of Science degree from the University of Tokyo for his dissertation on the taxonomy, distribution, ecology and palaeoecological relationships of deep-sea molluscs in Sagami Bay and surrounding waters.

=== Career ===
In 1954, Okutani joined the Tokai Regional Fisheries Research Laboratory of the Fisheries Agency.

From 1961 to 1962, he conducted research at the Scripps Institution of Oceanography in the United States.

In 1979, he became head of a research laboratory in the Department of Zoology at the National Museum of Nature and Science, then known as the National Science Museum.

In 1984, he was appointed professor at Tokyo University of Fisheries. He retired in 1996 and was subsequently awarded the title of professor emeritus. After his retirement, he served as a professor at Nihon University's College of Bioresource Sciences and was also associated with the Japan Marine Science and Technology Center (now the Japan Agency for Marine-Earth Science and Technology).

Okutani also served as president of the Malacological Society of Japan and later became its honorary president.

=== Death ===
Okutani died on 10 January 2025, at the age of 93. His death was reported on 12 January 2025.

== Research ==
Okutani specialised in the taxonomy, distribution, ecology and fisheries-related biology of molluscs. His research covered marine molluscs, including cephalopods such as squid and octopus, as well as marine gastropods and bivalves.

He contributed to the documentation and classification of Japanese and other marine molluscan fauna and authored and edited numerous scientific books, field guides and reference works.

== Publications ==
Okutani authored, co-authored, edited and translated numerous books on zoology, marine biology and molluscan science.

=== Books ===
- Gakken Illustrated Encyclopedia, Volume 52: Shells (『学研の図鑑 52 貝』). Gakken, 1981.
- Shells of Japan: Nature Observation Series – Ecology (『日本の貝 自然観察シリーズ 生態編』). Shogakukan, 1983.
- An Illustrated Guide to Shells (『貝がらのずかん』). Illustrated by Man Ayukawa. Saela Shobo, 1986.
- Epicurean Shells: Shellfish as a Gift of the Sea (『Epicurean貝 美食主義者の貝エピキュリアン 貝は海の恵み 母なるものの味わい』). Nippon Shuppansha, 1987.
- Squid Can Talk and Fly: An Introduction to the Fascinating World of Squid (『イカはしゃべるし、空も飛ぶ 面白いイカ学入門』). Kodansha Blue Backs, 1989.
- Swimming Shells and the Love of Octopuses: The Strange Ecology of Molluscs (『泳ぐ貝、タコの愛 軟体動物のふしぎな生態』). Shobunsha, 1991.
- Illustrated Guide to the World's Squid (『原色世界イカ類図鑑』). National Federation of Squid Processors Cooperatives, 1995.
- The Twenty Faces of Molluscs (『軟体動物二十面相』). Tokai University Press, 2003.
- Shells of Japan, Volume 1: Gastropods (『日本の貝 1 (巻貝)』). Gakken, 2006.
- Shells of Japan, Volume 2: Bivalves, Land Snails, Squid, Octopuses and Others (『日本の貝 2 (二枚貝・陸貝・イカ・タコほか)』). Gakken, 2006.
- New Illustrated Guide to the World's Squid (『新編世界イカ類図鑑』). Tokai University Press, 2015.

=== Co-authored, edited and supervised works ===
- Illustrated Encyclopedia of Fish and Shellfish (『魚と貝の図鑑』). Co-authored with Muneaki Abe. Illustrations by Shigeharu Amaki and others. Kodansha, 1958.
- Shells of Japan: Illustrated Nature Handbook (『日本の貝 原色・自然の手帖』). Co-authored with Yoshio Takemura. Kodansha Blue Backs, 1967.
- Life on Rocky Shores: Illustrated Nature Handbook (『磯の生物 原色・自然の手帖』). Co-authored with Yoshio Takemura and Katsumi Suzuki. Kodansha Blue Backs, 1967.
- The Most Detailed Illustrated Guide to the Ecology of Fish and Shellfish (『もっともくわしい魚貝生態図鑑』). Co-authored with Yoshio Takemura. Asahi Sonorama, 1975.
- Molluscs (『貝類』). Explanatory text by Okutani; photographs by Isamu Soyama. Tokai University Press, 1987.
- The Story of Males and Females: Fish (『♂♀のはなし さかな』). Co-edited and co-authored with Yasuhiko Taki. Gihodo Shuppan, 1991.
- Shellfish and Aquatic Animals (revised edition) (『貝・水の動物 新訂版』). Supervised and written with Minoru Imaji, Rikuo Shigei and Masanori Takeda. Gakken, 1994.
- Why Are Octopuses So Energetic? The Ecology and Folklore of Octopuses (『タコは、なぜ元気なのか タコの生態と民俗』). Co-edited and co-authored with Noritake Kanzaki. Soshisha, 1994.
- New Fisheries Science Series, Volume 6: Aquatic Invertebrates II – Useful and Harmful Species (『新水産学全集 6 水産無脊椎動物 2 有用・有害種各論』). Editor. Koseisha Koseikaku, 1994.
- Coastal Creatures (『海辺の生きもの』). Edited by Okutani; photographs by Isamu Soyama. Yama-kei Field Books, Yama to Keikoku-sha, 1994.
- Coral Reef Creatures (『サンゴ礁の生きもの』). Edited by Okutani; photographs by Isamu Soyama. Yama-kei Field Books, Yama to Keikoku-sha, 1994.
- The Seasons of Squid: Scientific Essays (『イカの春秋 サイエンスエッセイ』). Editor and author. Seizando Shoten, 1995.
- The Miracle of Shells: The Latest Science of Molluscs (『貝のミラクル 軟体動物の最新学』). Editor and author. Tokai University Press, 1997.
- Encyclopedia of Japanese Animals, Volume 7: Invertebrates (『日本動物大百科 第7巻 無脊椎動物』). Co-edited with Masanori Takeda and Michio Imafuku. Heibonsha, 1997.
- Japanese Common Names of Shells (『貝の和名』). Co-authored with Masatoyo Okamoto. Sagami Shellfish Society, 1997.
- The Latest Science of Aquatic Invertebrates (『水棲無脊椎動物の最新学』). Co-edited with Shigeru Ota and Rei Ueshima. University of Tokyo Press, 1999.
- Introduction to Malacology (『軟体動物学概説』). Co-edited with Tadashige Habe and Saburo Nishiwaki. Scientist-sha, 1999.
- Illustrated Catalogue of Molluscs from Japanese Waters (『日本近海産貝類図鑑』). Editor and author. Tokai University Press, 2000.
- The True Face of the Firefly Squid (『ホタルイカの素顔』). Editor and author. Tokai University Press, 2000.
- The Nutrition of Shrimp, the Taste of Squid and the Ecology of Shellfish: Biology, Nutrition and Functional Components of Aquatic Invertebrates (『エビの栄養・イカの味・貝の生態 水産無脊椎動物の生物学・栄養・機能成分』). Co-authored with Taneko Suzuki. Aboc, 2001.
- The Black-clad Invader: The Latest Research on Invasive Attached Bivalves (『黒装束の侵入者 外来付着性二枚貝の最新学』). Co-supervised with Takeshi Kajiwara; edited by the Japanese Society of Biofouling. Koseisha Koseikaku, 2001.
- Names of Insects, Shells and Fish: Topics Concerning Japanese Common Names (『虫の名、貝の名、魚の名 和名にまつわる話題』). Co-edited with Junichi Aoki and Keiichi Matsuura. Tokai University Press, 2002.
- Squid: From Biology to Consumption (third edition) (『イカ その生物から消費まで 3訂版』). Co-edited with Keiji Nasu and Michio Ogura. Seizando Shoten, 2002.
- Deep-Sea Organisms Observed by Manned Submersibles: Current Research on Deep-Sea Biology (『潜水調査船が観た深海生物 深海生物研究の現在』). Co-edited and co-authored with Katsunori Fujikura and Tadashi Maruyama. Tokai University Press, 2008.
- The Illustrated Wonders of Shells: Discovering Familiar Living Creatures (『貝のふしぎ図鑑 身近な生きものにしたしもう おどろきいっぱい!』). Supervisor. PHP Institute, 2008.
- Fresh Squid Science (『新鮮イカ学』). Editor and author. Tokai University Press, 2010.
- The Study of Japanese Octopuses (『日本のタコ学』). Editor and author. Tokai University Press, 2013.
- Beautiful Seashells: A Guide to the Small Treasures Found on the Seashore (『美しい貝殻 海辺で見つかる「小さな宝もの」ガイド』). Supervisor. Gakken, 2015.
- A History of Japanese Shell Collectors: Shell Collections That Shaped an Era (『ニッポン貝人列伝 時代をつくった貝コレクション』). Supervisor. LIXIL Publishing, 2017.
- Deep-Sea Creatures (『深海の生きもの』). Co-supervised with Kunio Amaoka. Kodansha's EX MOVE illustrated encyclopedia, Kodansha, 2017.
- Creatures in Water (『水の中の生きもの』). Supervisor. Kodansha's MOVE illustrated encyclopedia, Kodansha, 2018.

=== Translations ===
- A. Orr and S. Marshall. The World of Plankton: The Foundation of Marine Production (『プランクトンの世界 海の生産を支えるもの』). Translated by Okutani. Kodansha Blue Backs, 1972.
- Cy A. Adler. The Illusion of Ecology: American Pollution Debates and Their Critics (『エコロジーの幻想 アメリカの公害論争とその反論』). Translated by Okutani. Yugakusha, 1974.
- H. Stix and others. Shells: Their Culture and Beauty (『貝 その文化と美』). Photographed by H. Landschoff. Translated by Okutani. Asakura Publishing, 1980.
- R. Tucker Abbott and S. Peter Dance. Compendium of Seashells of the World (『世界海産貝類大図鑑』). Co-supervised and translated with Tadashige Habe. Heibonsha, 1985.
- National Geographic Society, ed. The Kingdom of the Sea: Living on Earth, Living with Earth (『海の王国 地球に生きる・地球と生きる』). Translation supervised by Okutani. Dohosha Publishing, 1993.
