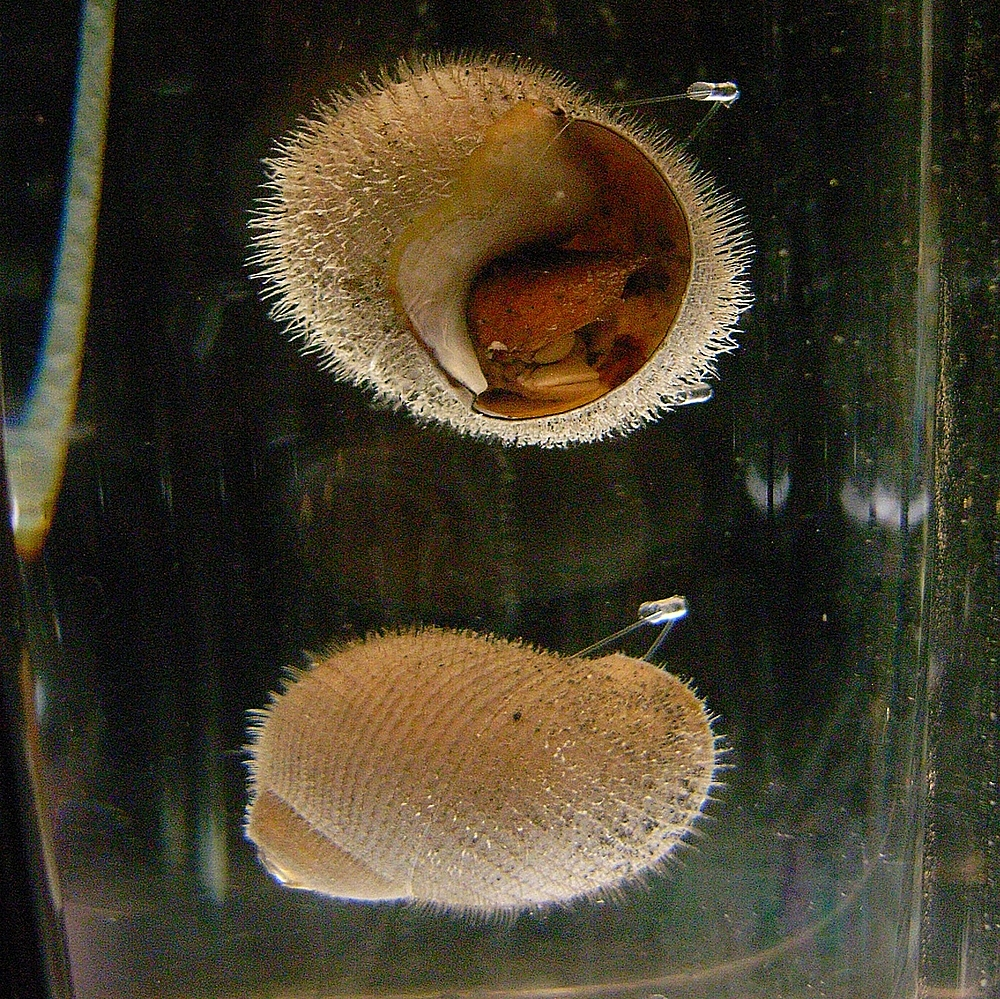
- Two preserved individuals of Alviniconcha hessleri

Scientific classification
- Kingdom: Animalia
- Phylum: Mollusca
- Class: Gastropoda
- Subclass: Caenogastropoda
- Order: incertae sedis
- Superfamily: Abyssochrysoidea
- Family: Provannidae; Warén & Ponder, 1991

Type genus
- Provanna Dall, 1918

Synonyms
- Pseudonininae Bertolaso & Palazzi, 1994

= Provannidae =

Provannidae Temporal range: Cenomanian–Recent

Family of gastropods

Provannidae is a family of deep water sea snails, marine gastropod mollusks in the superfmaily Abyssochrysoidea (according to the taxonomy of the Gastropoda by Bouchet & Rocroi, 2005 and updated in 2008 by Kaim et al.).

The genera Provanna and Desbruyeresia have smaller and slender shells, while the shells of Alviniconcha and Ifremeria are larger and swollen. The shells of these two last genera house a hypertrophied ctenidium large quantities of symbiotic bacteria.

== Habitat ==
These snails are part of the fauna of the deep-sea hydrothermal vents, cold seeps, whale falls, and sunken driftwood environments.

== Taxonomy ==
The family Provaniidae was previously placed in the "Zygopleuroid group" (according to the taxonomy of the Gastropoda by Bouchet & Rocroi, 2005). This family has no subfamilies according to the taxonomy of the Gastropoda by Bouchet & Rocroi, 2005.

Subsequently, Provaniidae was placed in the superfamily Abyssochrysoidea Tomlin, 1927.

There are some affinities with the Littorinoidea as shown by molecular data and sperm ultrastructure

Multi-gene analysis has shown that the family Provannidae is paraphyletic. It is being treated as belonging to the superfamily Abyssochrysoidea until a new family-level revision has been undertaken.

== Genera ==
Genera within the family Provannidae include:

- Alviniconcha Okutani & Ohta, 1988
- Cordesia Warén & Bouchet, 2009 - with the only species Cordesia provannoides Warén & Bouchet, 2009
- Desbruyeresia Warén & Bouchet, 1993
- Ifremeria Bouchet & Warén, 1991
  - Ifremeria nautilei - this species has endosymbiotic bacteria, which provide "food" via chemoautotrophy.
- Provanna Dall, 1918
- Rubyspira Johnson et al., 2010 (not assigned to a family)

Genera brought into synonymy

- Olgaconcha L. Beck, 1991: synonym of Ifremeria Bouchet & Warén, 1991
