= List of the Paleozoic life of Nevada =

This list of the Paleozoic life of Nevada contains the various prehistoric life-forms whose fossilized remains have been reported from within the US state of Nevada and are between 538.8 and 252.17 million years of age.

== A ==
- †Aatocrinus
  - †Aatocrinus permicus
- †Acaciapora
  - †Acaciapora duncanae – type locality for species
- †Acanthocladia
- †Acanthopecten
  - †Acanthopecten coloradoensis
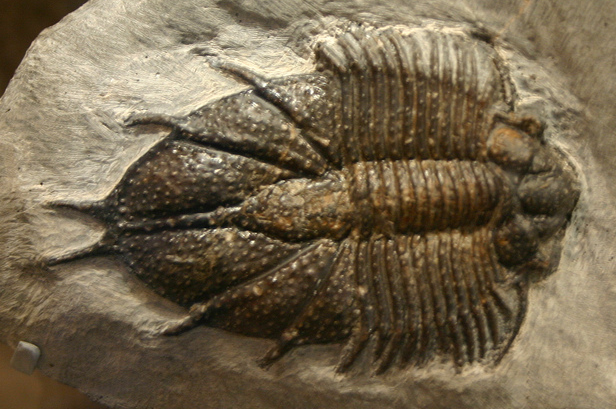
- Fossil of the Silurian-Middle Devonian trilobite Acanthopyge
  †Acanthopyge
- †Achlysopsis
  - †Achlysopsis hemitora
  - †Achlysopsis liokata
- †Aciculolenus
  - †Aciculolenus peculiaris
- †Acidiphorus
  - †Acidiphorus brevis – or unidentified comparable form
  - †Acidiphorus lineotuberculatus
  - †Acidiphorus pseudobathurus
- †Aclisina
- †Acmarhachis
  - †Acmarhachis acuta
  - †Acmarhachis acutus
  - †Acmarhachis typicalis
- †Acodus
  - †Acodus auritus – or unidentified comparable form
- †Acontiodus
  - †Acontiodus alveolaris
- †Acosarina
  - †Acosarina mesoplatys
- †Acratia
  - †Acratia gassanovae – or unidentified related form
  - †Acratia silincula – or unidentified related form
  - †Acratia subelongata
- †Acrocyathus
- †Acrospirifer
  - †Acrospirifer murchisoni – or unidentified related form
- †Acrothyra
- †Actinostroma
- †Acutichiton
  - †Acutichiton gracilis – type locality for species
  - †Acutichiton nevadensis – type locality for species
- †Adamsoceras
  - †Adamsoceras isabelae
- †Adelograptus
  - †Adelograptus antiquus
- †Aechmina – tentative report
- †Aesopomum
  - †Aesopomum varistriatus – or unidentified comparable form
- †Agathammina
- †Agnostocrinus
  - †Agnostocrinus typus
- †Agnostotes
  - †Agnostotes clavata – or unidentified comparable form
- †Agnostus
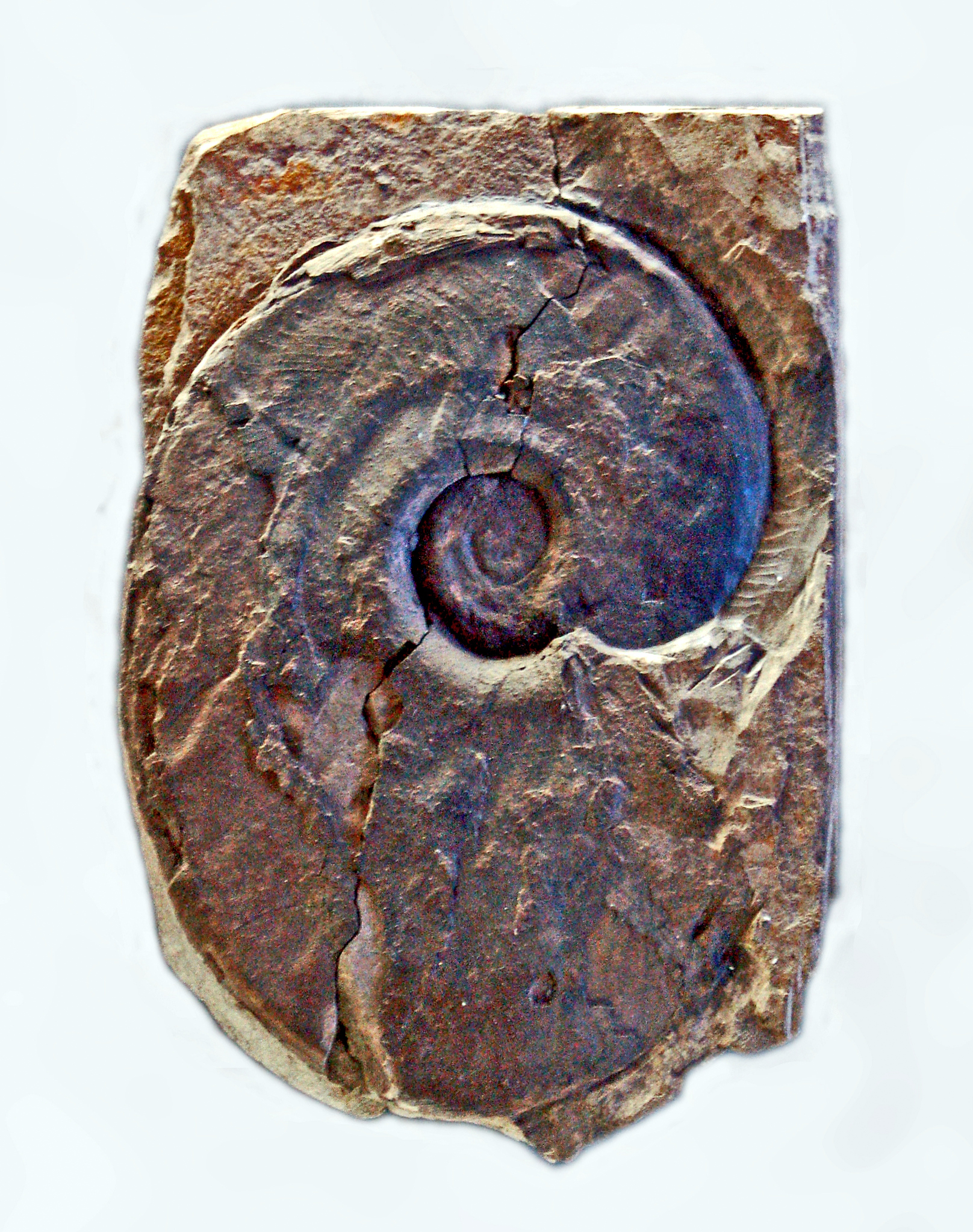
- Fossilized shell of the Middle Devonian ammonoid cephalopod, Agoniatites
  †Agoniatites
- †Alaskospira
- †Albertella
  - †Albertella aspinosa
  - †Albertella eiloitys
  - †Albertella fritizi – type locality for species
  - †Albertella fritzi – type locality for species
  - †Albertella highlandensis – type locality for species
  - †Albertella judithi
  - †Albertella lata – type locality for species
  - †Albertella schenki – type locality for species
  - †Albertella spectrensis
- †Albertellina
  - †Albertellina aspinosa
- †Albertelloides – type locality for genus
  - †Albertelloides kitae – type locality for species
  - †Albertelloides kitai – type locality for species
  - †Albertelloides mischi – type locality for species
  - †Albertelloides pandispinata – type locality for species
  - †Albertelloides rectimaginatus
  - †Albertelloides rectimarginatus
- †Allorhynchus
  - †Allorhynchus heteropsis
- †Allorisma – report made of unidentified related form or using admittedly obsolete nomenclature
- †Allosocrinus – tentative report
- †Alokistocare
  - †Alokistocare alta – type locality for species
- †Alokistocarella
  - †Alokistocarella brighamensis – or unidentified comparable form
- †Altiocculus
  - †Altiocculus drumensis
- †Alveolites
- †Amaurotoma
  - †Amaurotoma zappa – type locality for species
- †Ambocoelia
  - †Ambocoelia lobata – tentative report
  - †Ambocoelia recidiva
- †Ambothyris
- †Amecephalites – type locality for genus
  - †Amecephalites sundbergi – type locality for species
- †Amecephalus
  - †Amecephalus arrojosensis
  - †Amecephalus laticaudum
- †Amorphognathus
  - †Amorphognathus ordovicicus
- †Amphilichas
  - †Amphilichas minganensis – or unidentified related form
- †Amphipora
- †Amphiscapha
  - †Amphiscapha intermedius – type locality for species
  - †Amphiscapha proxima
- †Amplexizaphrentis
- †Amplexoides
  - †Amplexoides radicosi – tentative report
- †Amplifallotaspis
  - †Amplifallotaspis keni
- †Ampyx – tentative report
- †Ampyx
- †Ampyxina
- †Ampyxoides
  - †Ampyxoides occipitalis – or unidentified comparable form
- †Anabarella
  - †Anabarella chelata – type locality for species
- †Anabolotreta
  - †Anabolotreta glabra – type locality for species
  - †Anabolotreta mogota – type locality for species
- † Ananias
  - †Ananias nevadensis
  - †Ananias seminudum – type locality for species
- †Anaphilicas – tentative report
- †Anastrophia
  - †Anastrophia magnifica – or unidentified comparable form
- †Anataphrus
  - †Anataphrus martinensis
  - †Anataphrus spurius – or unidentified comparable form
- †Ancillotoechia
  - †Ancillotoechia aptata
  - †Ancillotoechia pahranagatensis
- †Anechocephalus
  - †Anechocephalus spinosus
  - †Anechocephalus trigranulatus
- †Anemonaria
  - †Anemonaria delicatula
- Angulocellularia
- †Angulotreta
- †Anisocyamus
- †Anisopyge
- †Anisotrypa
- †Anisotrypella
- †Anolotichia
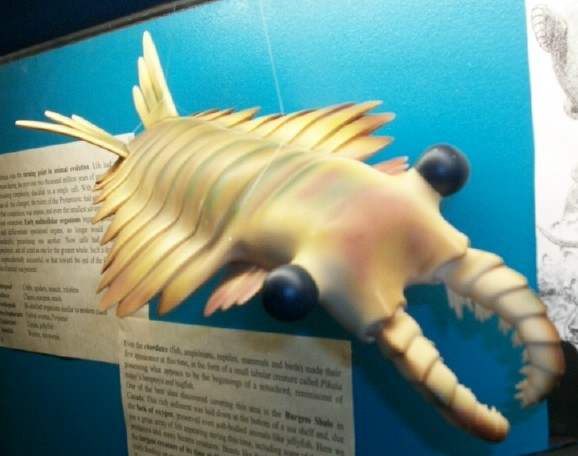
- Restorative model of the Cambrian arthropod Anomalocaris
  †Anomalocaris
- †Anomalorthis
  - †Anomalorthis fascicostatus – or unidentified comparable form
  - †Anomalorthis fascicostellatus
  - †Anomalorthis lonensis
  - †Anomalorthis nevadensis
  - †Anomalorthis oklahomensis
  - †Anomalorthis resoi
  - †Anomalorthis utahensis
- †Anomphalus
  - †Anomphalus jaggerius – type locality for species
- †Anoplia
  - †Anoplia elongata
- †Anostylostroma
- †Antagmus
  - †Antagmus arenosus – type locality for species
- †Anthaspidella
  - †Anthaspidella clintoni
- †Anthraconeilo – tentative report
- †Anthracospirifer
  - †Anthracospirifer bifurcatus – or unidentified comparable form
  - †Anthracospirifer birdspringensis
  - †Anthracospirifer curvilateralis
  - †Anthracospirifer newberryi
  - †Anthracospirifer occiduus
  - †Anthracospirifer opimus
  - †Anthracospirifer pellaensis – or unidentified related form
- †Anticostia
  - †Anticostia fastigata
  - †Anticostia fastigiata
  - †Anticostia festigata
  - †Anticostia lata
  - †Anticostia macgregorae
  - †Anticostia tenuissima
  - †Anticostia thorsteinssoni
  - †Anticostia uniformis
- †Antiquatonia
  - †Antiquatonia coloradoensis
  - †Antiquatonia elyensis
  - †Antiquatonia hermosana
  - †Antiquatonia morrowensis
  - †Antiquatonia portlockianus
- †Antirhynchonella
- †Antistrix
  - †Antistrix invicta
- †Apachella
- †Apachia
  - †Apachia butlerensis
- †Aparchites
- †Apatokephalus
  - †Apatokephalus finalis – tentative report
- †Apatolichas
  - †Apatolichas jukesi – or unidentified comparable form
- †Aphelaspis
  - †Aphelaspis brachyphasis – type locality for species
  - †Aphelaspis buttsi
  - †Aphelaspis haguei
  - †Aphelaspis subditus
- †Aphelotoxon
  - †Aphelotoxon acuminata
  - †Aphelotoxon marginata
  - †Aphelotoxon punctata
- †Apheoorthis
- †Aphroidophyllum
  - †Aphroidophyllum inceptor – type locality for species
- †Aploconus
  - †Aploconus lafustei – type locality for species
- †Aporthophyla
  - †Aporthophyla typa
  - †Aporthophyla typica
- †Appendispinograptus
  - †Appendispinograptus leptothecalis
  - †Appendispinograptus longispinus
  - †Appendispinograptus supernus
- †Arceodomus
  - †Arceodomus glabrata
  - †Arceodomus langenheimi
- †Archaediscus
  - †Archaediscus krestovnikovi
  - †Archaediscus moelleri – or unidentified loosely related form
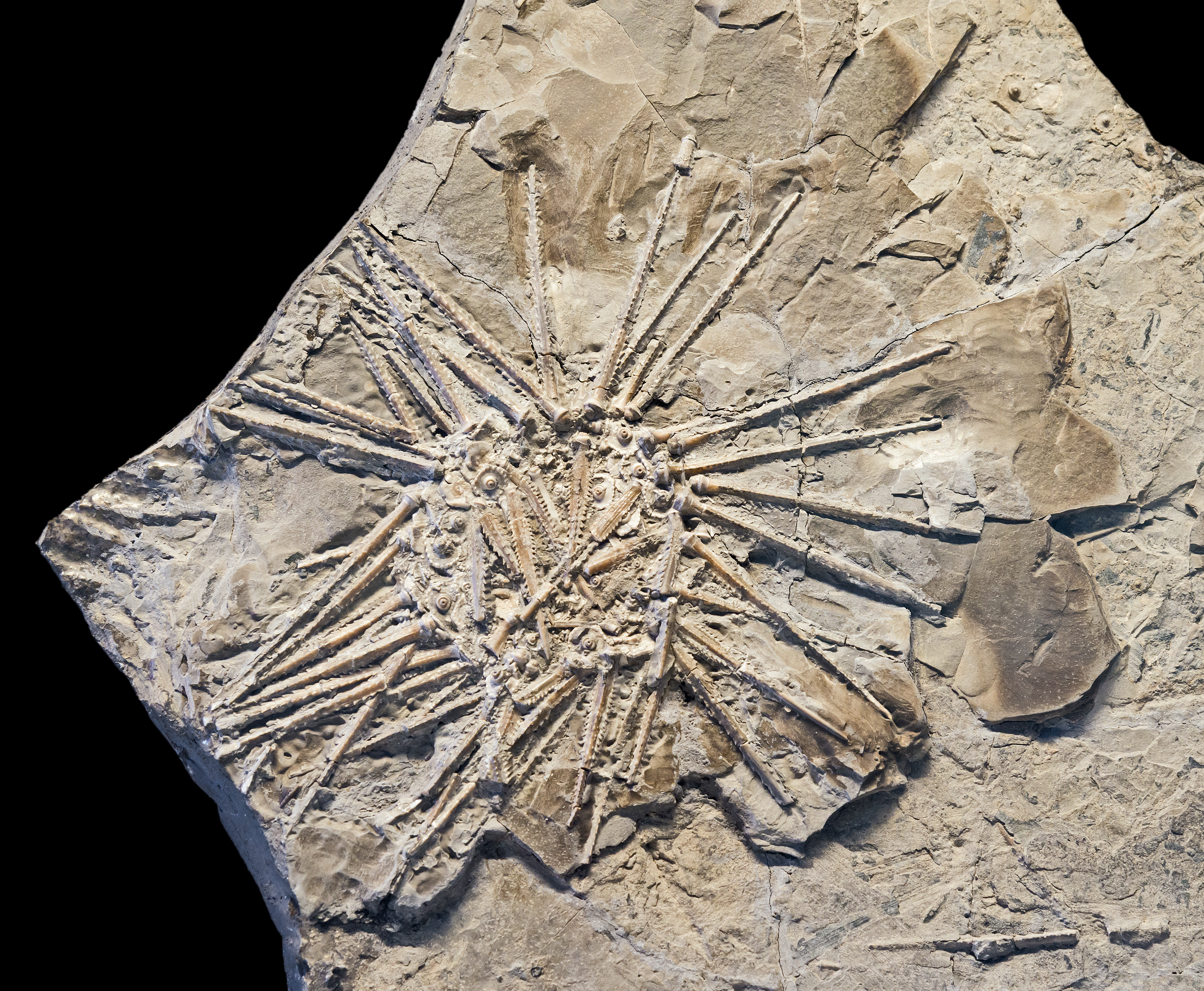
- Fossilized shell and spines of the Late Devonian-Permian sea urchin Archaeocidaris
  †Archaeocidaris
- †Archaeocothurnus
  - †Archaeocothurnus goshutensis – type locality for species
- †Archaeocyathus
  - †Archaeocyathus atlanticus – or unidentified comparable form
- †Archaeophiomusium
  - †Archaeophiomusium bispinosum – type locality for species
  - †Archaeophiomusium burrisi
- †Archaeorthis
  - †Archaeorthis costellatus
  - †Archaeorthis elongata
  - †Archaeorthis elongatus
- †Archaeoscyphia
  - †Archaeoscyphia bassleri – type locality for species
  - †Archaeoscyphia eganensis – type locality for species
  - †Archaeoscyphia pannosa – type locality for species
  - †Archaeoscyphia pulchra
  - †Archaeoscyphia rossi – type locality for species
- †Archaeosycon
  - †Archaeosycon copulatus
- †Archinacella – tentative report
- †Arcochiton
  - †Arcochiton richardsoni – type locality for species
- †Areostrophia
  - †Areostrophia rara
- †Arroyocrinus
  - †Arroyocrinus brachiatus
  - †Arroyocrinus popenoei
- †Arrythmocricus
  - †Arrythmocricus mcdamensis
- †Asaphellus
  - †Asaphellus eudocia – or unidentified comparable form
  - †Asaphellus riojanus
- †Asarcophyllum
  - †Asarcophyllum ramosum
- †Ascopora
- †Asgardaspira
  - †Asgardaspira measuresae
  - †Asgardaspira yochelsoni
- †Asphaltina
- †Aspidagnostus
  - †Aspidagnostus laevis – type locality for species
  - †Aspidagnostus rugosus
- †Astartella
  - †Astartella subquadrata
- †Asthenophyllum
  - †Asthenophyllum orthoseptatum – tentative report
- †Astreptodictya
- †Astroproetus
- †Asymphylotoechia
  - †Asymphylotoechia nolani
- †Atelelasma
  - †Atelelasma primotica
- †Athabaskia
- †Athyridacid
- †Athyris
  - †Athyris angelica
  - †Athyris angelicoidea
  - †Athyris lamellosa
- †Atopocystis – type locality for genus
  - †Atopocystis mucronata – type locality for species
- †Atrypa
  - †Atrypa nevadana
  - †Atrypa parva – or unidentified comparable form
  - †Atrypa reticularis
- †Atrypina
  - †Atrypina erugata
  - †Atrypina rugata
  - †Atrypina simpsoni – type locality for species
- †Atrypoidea
- †Aulacoparia
  - †Aulacoparia venta – or unidentified comparable form
- †Aulocystis
- †Aulopora
- †Auloprotonia
- †Australispongia
  - †Australispongia compressa – type locality for species
- †Australophyllum – tentative report
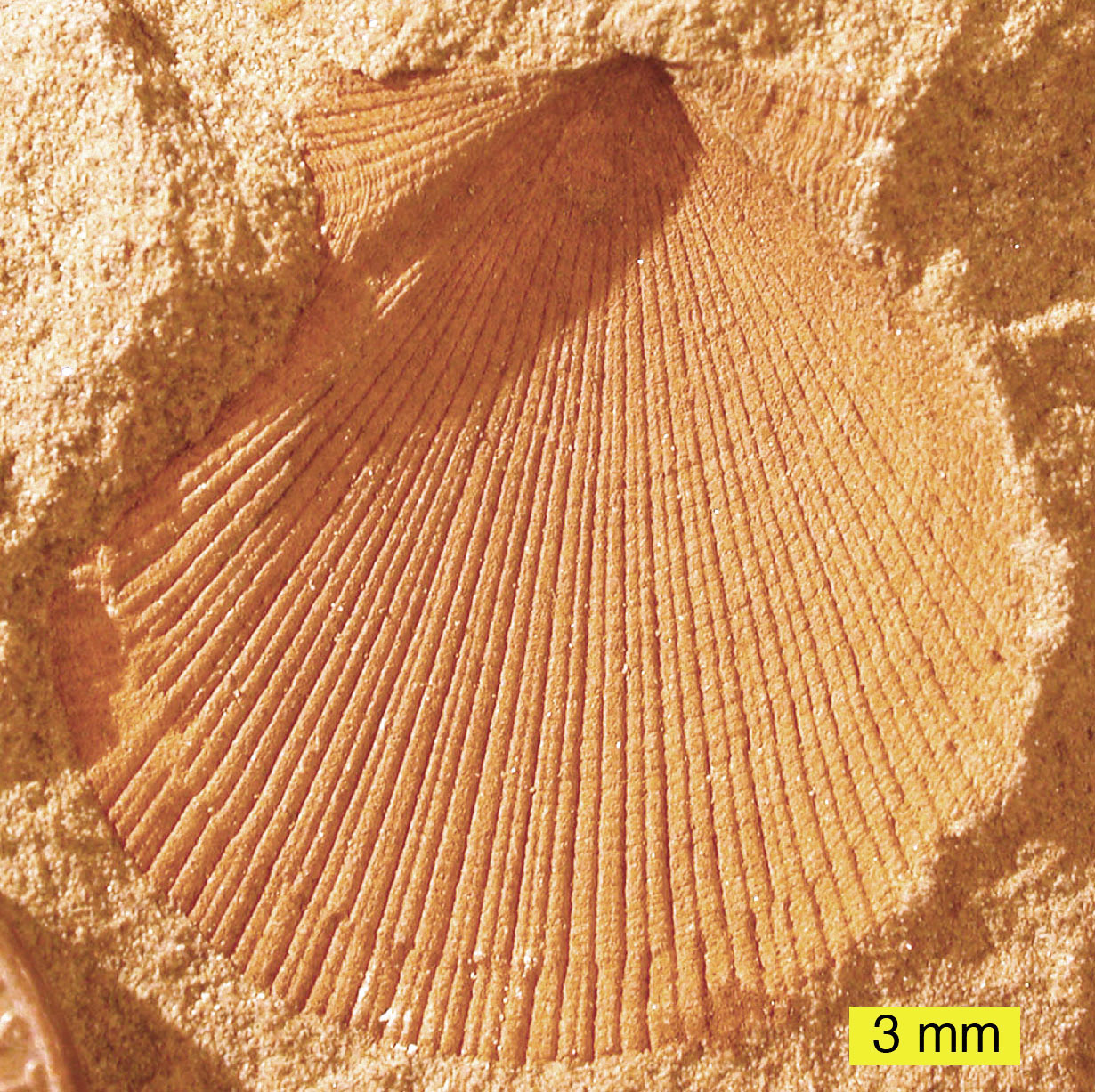
- Mold fossil of a shell of the Early Devonian-Late Triassic bivalve Aviculopecten
  †Aviculopecten
  - †Aviculopecten affinis
  - †Aviculopecten eurekensis
  - †Aviculopecten haguei
  - †Aviculopecten pintoensis
- †Aviculopinna
  - †Aviculopinna consimilis – or unidentified comparable form
  - †Aviculopinna peracuta – tentative report
- †Avonia
- †Axofistulophyllum
  - †Axofistulophyllum conulus – tentative report
  - †Axofistulophyllum convexum

== B ==
- †Bactroceras
  - †Bactroceras angustisiphonatum
- Bairdia
  - †Bairdia confragosaeformis – or unidentified comparable form
  - †Bairdia fabaeformis – or unidentified comparable form
  - †Bairdia manifesta
- †Bairdiacypris
  - †Bairdiacypris anteroangulosa
  - †Bairdiacypris martinae
  - †Bairdiacypris quarziana
- †Bairdiocypris
- †Bakevellia
- †Ballardina
  - †Ballardina simplex
- †Baltoceras
  - †Baltoceras striatum – type locality for species
- †Basilicus
  - †Basilicus mackeei
  - †Basilicus mckeei
- †Batenevia
- †Bathymyonia
  - †Bathymyonia nevadensis – type locality for species
  - †Bathymyonia type locality for species A – informal
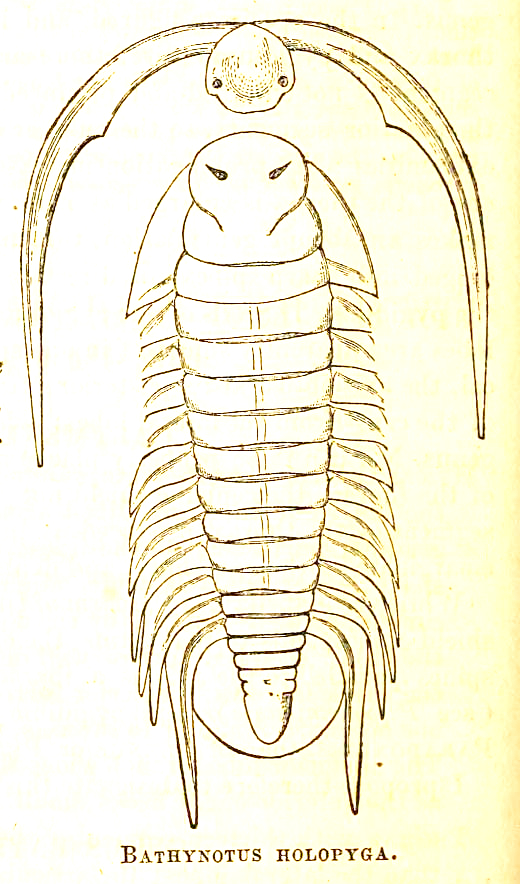
- Illustration of a fossil of the Cambrian trilobite Bathynotus
  †Bathynotus
  - †Bathynotus holopygus
- †Bathyocos
  - †Bathyocos housensis
- †Bathyurellus
  - †Bathyurellus feitleri
- †Bathyuriscus
  - †Bathyuriscus petalus
- †Bathyurus
  - †Bathyurus acutus
  - †Bathyurus extans – or unidentified comparable form
  - †Bathyurus nevadensis
  - †Bathyurus sunbloodensis
- †Batostomellina
- †Beecheria
- †Bekena
- †Bellazona
  - †Bellazona bella
- †Bellefontia
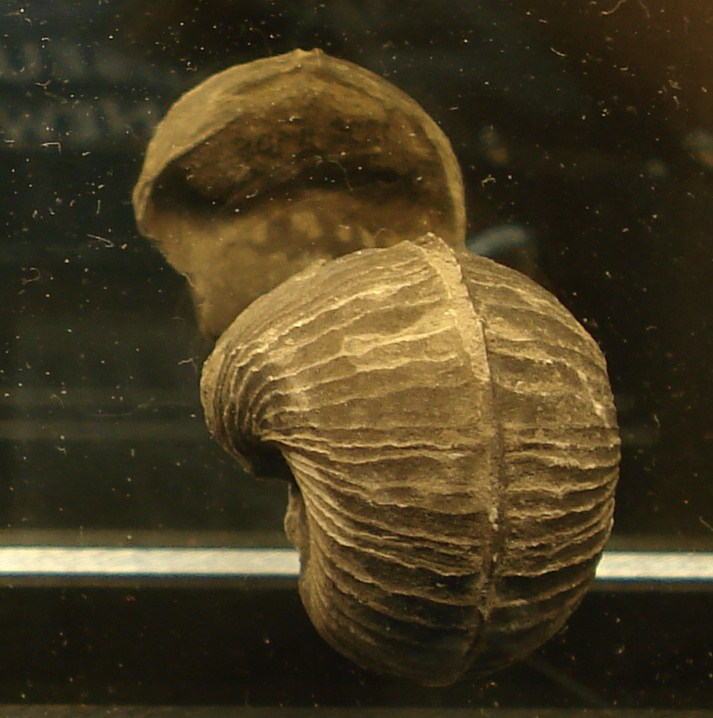
- Fossilized shell of the Silurian-Early Triassic mollusc Bellerophon
  †Bellerophon
  - †Bellerophon deflectus
  - †Bellerophon needlensis – type locality for species
  - †Bellerophon nevadensis
- †Belodella
- †Belodina
  - †Belodina confluens
  - †Belodina disponsa – or unidentified comparable form
  - †Belodina monitorensis
  - †Belodina ornata – or unidentified comparable form
- †Benthamaspis
  - †Benthamaspis sera
- †Bergaueria – tentative report
- †Besselodus
  - †Besselodus borealis
- †Beyrichia
- †Bicarina
  - †Bicarina type locality for species A – informal
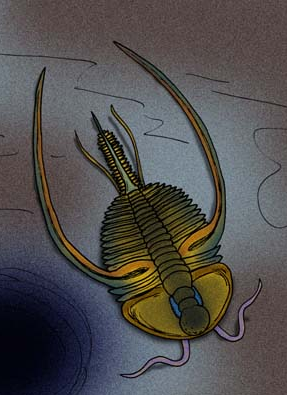
- Life restoration of the Cambrian trilobite Biceratops
  †Biceratops – type locality for genus
  - †Biceratops nevadensis – type locality for species
- †Biciragnostus
  - †Biciragnostus viator
- †Bienvillia
  - †Bienvillia papulosa
- †Bifida – tentative report
- †Bighornia
- † Bija
- †Bilobia
- †Bimuria
- †Blastoidocrinus
  - †Blastoidocrinus nevadensis
- †Blosyropsis
- †Blountia
  - †Blountia bristolensis
- †Bohemograptus
  - †Bohemograptus bohemicus
- †Bojothyris
- †Bolbocephalus – tentative report
- †Bolbolenellus
  - †Bolbolenellus brevispinus – type locality for species
- †Bonnia
  - †Bonnia caperata – type locality for species
  - †Bonnia copia – type locality for species
- †Botomaella
- †Boucotspira
  - †Boucotspira antelopensis
- †Boultonia
  - †Boultonia heezeni – type locality for species
- †Brachyprion
  - †Brachyprion geniculata
  - †Brachyprion mirabilis
- †Brachyspirifer
  - †Brachyspirifer pinyonoides – type locality for species
- †Bradyfallotaspis
- †Bradyphyllum
  - †Bradyphyllum gracilium – type locality for species
- †Bransonia
- †Brasilioproductus
  - †Brasilioproductus welleri – or unidentified comparable form
- †Brevibelus
  - †Brevibelus breviformis
- †Breviphrentis
  - †Breviphrentis invaginata
  - †Breviphrentis invaginatus
  - †Breviphrentis johnsoni
  - †Breviphrentis kirki
  - †Breviphrentis magna
- †Briantia
  - †Briantia mulleri
- †Bristolia
  - †Bristolia anteros
  - †Bristolia bristolensis
  - †Bristolia fragilis
- †Broeggeria – tentative report
- †Bromella
  - †Bromella veritas
- †Brongniartella
- †Brunsia
- †Budnaniella
  - †Budnaniella shenandoense – or unidentified comparable form
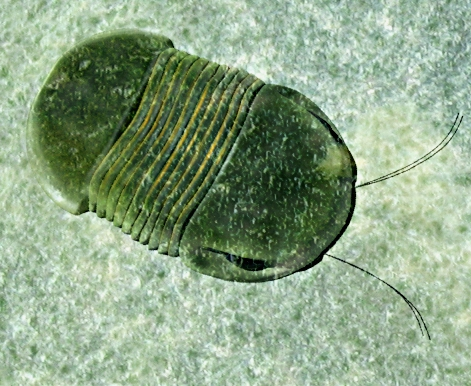
- Life restoration of the Early Ordovician-Silurian trilobite Bumastus
  †Bumastus
- †Buxtonia
  - †Buxtonia websteri – type locality for species
- †Bynumina
  - †Bynumina globosa
- †Bythicheilus
- Bythocypris

== C ==
- †Caborcella
  - †Caborcella clinolimbata – type locality for species
  - †Caborcella ganosa
  - †Caborcella granosa
  - †Caborcella pseudaulax
  - †Caborcella reducta
- †Cabrieroceras
  - †Cabrieroceras crispiforme – or unidentified related form
- †Calathium
- †Calcispheara
- †Calcitornella
- †Calcivertella
- †Caliendrum – or unidentified related form
- †Calliprotonia
  - †Calliprotonia spinula – type locality for species
- †Calstevenus – type locality for genus
  - †Calstevenus arcturus – type locality for species
- †Calycalyptella
- †Calycocoelia
  - †Calycocoelia murella – type locality for species
  - †Calycocoelia typicalis
- †Calygirtyoceras
  - †Calygirtyoceras arcticum
- †Calymene
- †Calyptaulax
  - †Calyptaulax callirachis – or unidentified comparable form
- †Camarotoechia
  - †Camarotoechia modica – or unidentified comparable form
  - †Camarotoechia pahranagatensis
  - †Camarotoechia vesper
- †Camerella
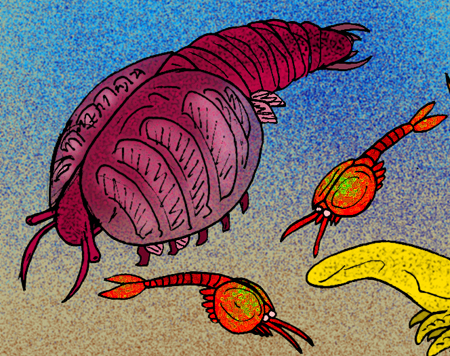
- Life restoration of the Cambrian arthropod Canadaspis (left)
  †Canadaspis
- †Canadiphyllum
- †Cancelloceras
  - †Cancelloceras elegans – or unidentified comparable form
- †Cancrinella
- †Caninia
  - †Caninia elkoensis – type locality for species
  - †Caninia goldcreekensis – type locality for species
  - †Caninia torquia
- †Caninostrotion
- †Canthylotreta
  - †Canthylotreta crista – type locality for species
- †Cardiomorpha
- †Carinagypa
- †Carinamala
  - †Carinamala longispina – type locality for species
- †Carlinastraea
  - †Carlinastraea halysitoides
- †Carolinites
  - †Carolinites ekphymosus – or unidentified comparable form
  - †Carolinites genacinaca
  - †Carolinites killaryensis – or unidentified comparable form
  - †Carolinites sibiricus
- †Carrickia
- †Cassidirostrum
  - †Cassidirostrum eurekaensis – or unidentified comparable form
  - †Cassidirostrum vexans – type locality for species
- †Catazona – type locality for genus
  - †Catazona rudilirata – type locality for species
- †Catazone
  - †Catazone nevadana – type locality for species
- †Catenipora
- †Catoraphiceras
  - †Catoraphiceras foerstei
- †Cavusgnathus
  - †Cavusgnathus gigantus
  - †Cavusgnathus lautus
  - †Cavusgnathus spathus
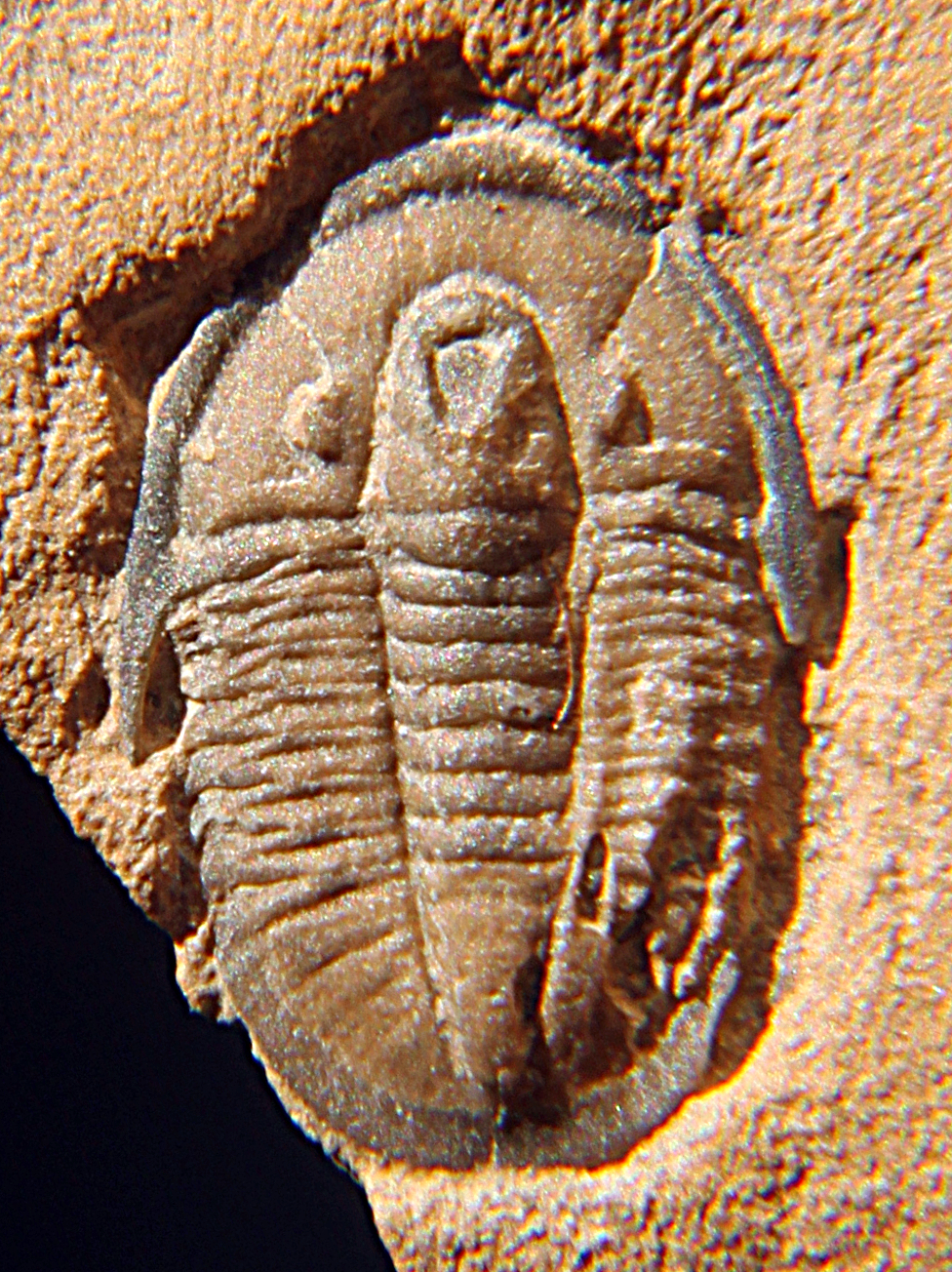
- Fossil of the Cambrian trilobite Cedaria
  †Cedaria
  - †Cedaria brevifrons – type locality for species
- †Celonocrinus
  - †Celonocrinus expansus
- †Cenorhynchia
  - †Cenorhynchia type locality for species A – informal
  - †Cenorhynchia type locality for species B – informal
- †Centropleura
- †Ceratocephala – tentative report
- †Ceratoikiscum – tentative report
- †Ceratopea
  - †Ceratopea latiumbilicata – or unidentified comparable form
  - †Ceratopea lemonei
- †Ceraurinella
- †Ceraurinus
  - †Ceraurinus icarus
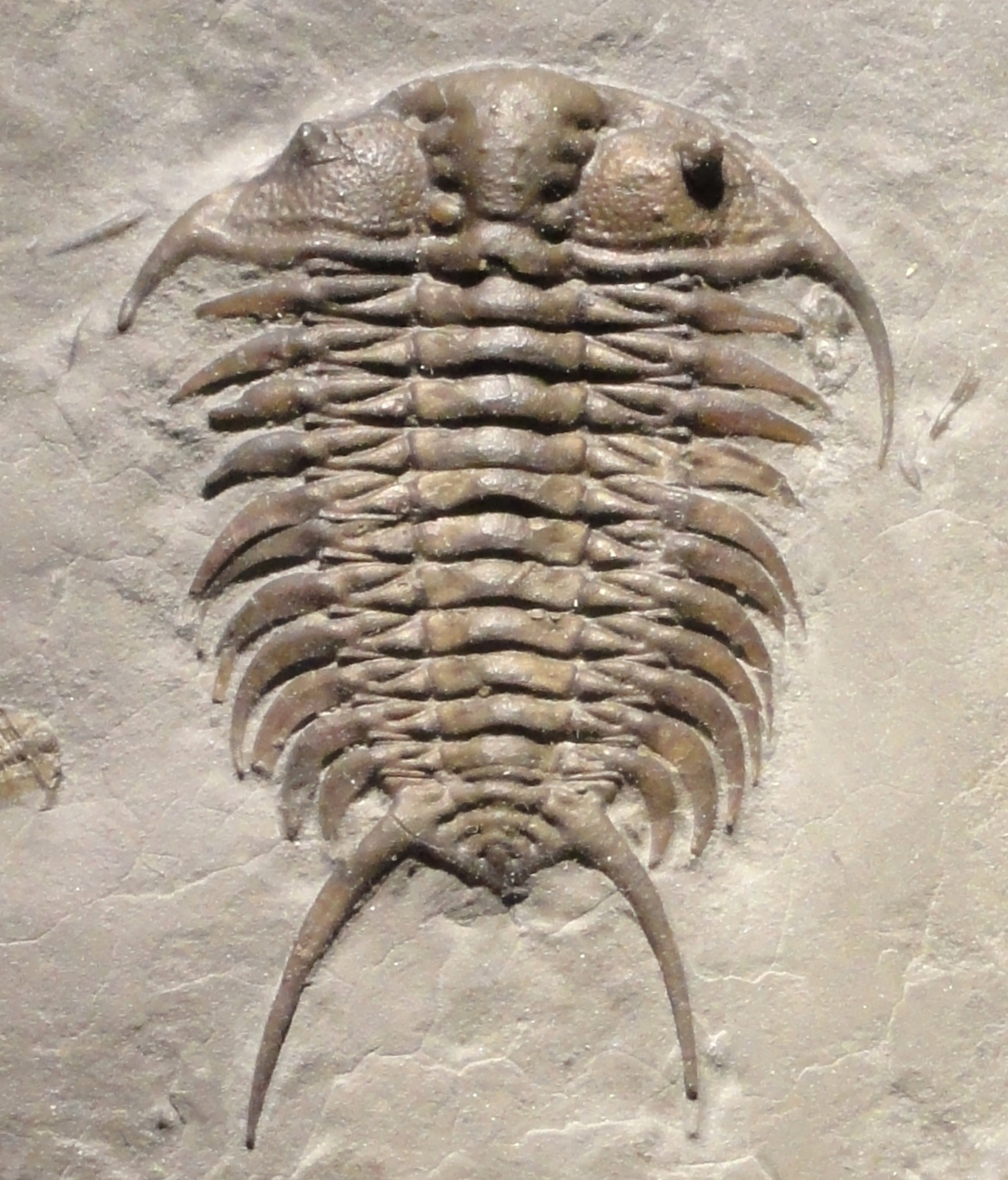
- Fossil of the Middle-Late Ordovician trilobite Ceraurus
  †Ceraurus
- †Cernuolimbus
  - †Cernuolimbus depressus
  - †Cernuolimbus granulosus
  - †Cernuolimbus laevifrons
  - †Cernuolimbus orygmatos
  - †Cernuolimbus semigranulosus
- †Chaetetes
  - †Chaetetes milleporaceus
- †Chalaroschwagerina
  - †Chalaroschwagerina ampla – type locality for species
  - †Chalaroschwagerina eximia – type locality for species
  - †Chalaroschwagerina formosa – type locality for species
  - †Chalaroschwagerina globularis – type locality for species
  - †Chalaroschwagerina inflata – type locality for species
  - †Chalaroschwagerina solita – type locality for species
  - †Chalaroschwagerina tumentis
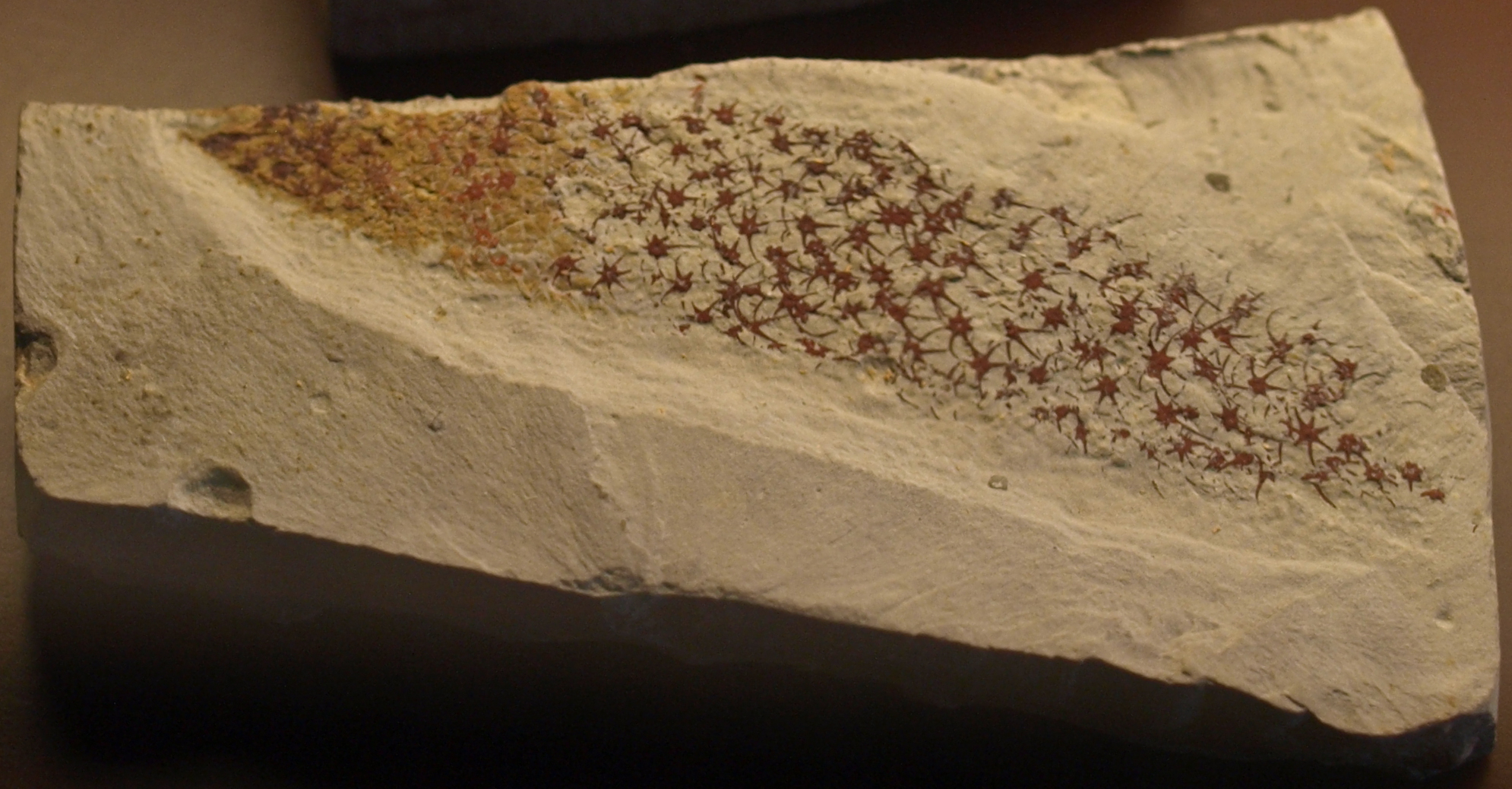
- Chancelloria
  †Chancelloria
- †Chancia
  - †Chancia maladensis – tentative report
  - †Chancia venusta
  - †Chancia venuxa – or unidentified comparable form
- †Chanciaopsis
  - †Chanciaopsis heteromorphos
- †Charchaqia
  - †Charchaqia norini
- †Chaulistomella – tentative report
- †Chazydictya
- †Cheilocephalus
  - †Cheilocephalus brachyops
  - †Cheilocephalus brevilobus
  - †Cheilocephalus granulosus
- †Chonetes
  - †Chonetes euampygus
  - †Chonetes logani
- †Choperella
  - †Choperella jeanette
- †Choristites
  - †Choristites orbitus – type locality for species
- †Cibolocrinus
  - †Cibolocrinus typus
- †Cladochonus
  - †Cladochonus nevadensis – type locality for species
  - †Cladochonus shawi – type locality for species
- Fossilized tooth of the shark Cladodus
  †Cladodus
- †Cladopora
- †Clathronema
  - †Clathronema batteni – type locality for species
- †Clathrospira
- †Cleiothyrdina
  - †Cleiothyrdina orbicularis
- †Cleiothyridina
  - †Cleiothyridina angelicoides – or unidentified comparable form
  - †Cleiothyridina ciriacksi
  - †Cleiothyridina deroissyi
  - †Cleiothyridina elegans
  - †Cleiothyridina milleri
  - †Cleiothyridina orbicularis
  - †Cleiothyridina pecosii
  - †Cleiothyridina pecossi – or unidentified comparable form
  - †Cleiothyridina reticulata
  - †Cleiothyridina type locality for species A – informal
  - †Cleiothyridina type locality for species B – informal
- †Clelandia – tentative report
- †Climacammina
  - †Climacammina patula – or unidentified loosely related form
  - †Climacammina prisca – or unidentified loosely related form
- †Climacograptus
  - †Climacograptus caudatus
  - †Climacograptus hastatus
  - †Climacograptus innotatus
  - †Climacograptus phyllophorus – or unidentified comparable form
  - †Climacograptus tridentatus
  - †Climacograptus tubuliferus
- †Climaconus
- †Clinopistha
  - †Clinopistha levis
- †Clisiophyllum
- †Clisospira
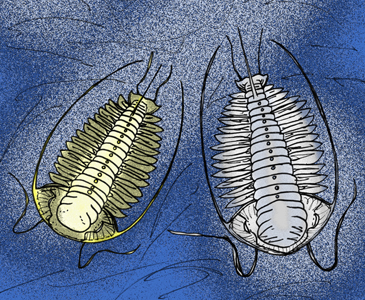
- Cloacaspis
  †Cloacaspis
  - †Cloacaspis tesselata
- †Clonopora – tentative report
- †Cnemidactis
  - †Cnemidactis macroadambulacralatas – type locality for species
- †Coelospira
  - †Coelospira concava
  - †Coelospira pseudocamilla – type locality for species
- †Colaptomena
- †Coledium
  - †Coledium therum
- †Coleoloides
  - †Coleoloides inyoensis – type locality for species
- †Colinispongia
  - †Colinispongia regularis – type locality for species
- †Colpites
- †Columnaria
- †Comanchia
  - †Comanchia minus
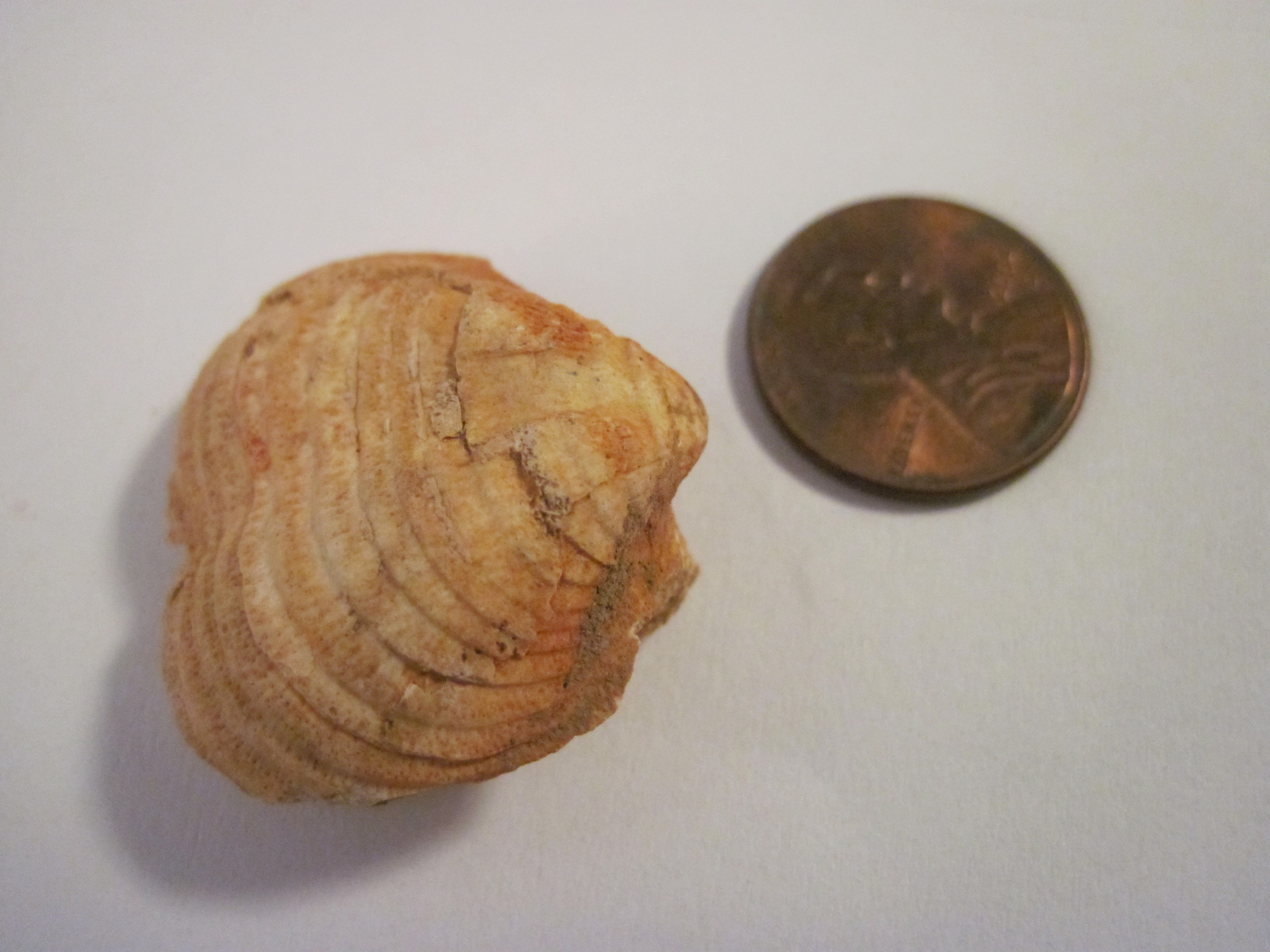
- Fossilized shell of the Late Devonian-Permian brachiopod Composita
  †Composita
  - †Composita apheles – or unidentified comparable form
  - †Composita gibbosa
  - †Composita mexicana
  - †Composita mira
  - †Composita ovata
  - †Composita parasulcata
  - †Composita subquadrata
  - †Composita subtilita
  - †Composita trilobata
  - †Composita trilobita
  - †Composita trinuclea
- †Compsonema – type locality for genus
  - †Compsonema fragile – type locality for species
- †Conchidium
- †Conchopeltus
- †Conocardium
- †Conotoma
  - †Conotoma aurora
- †Conotreta
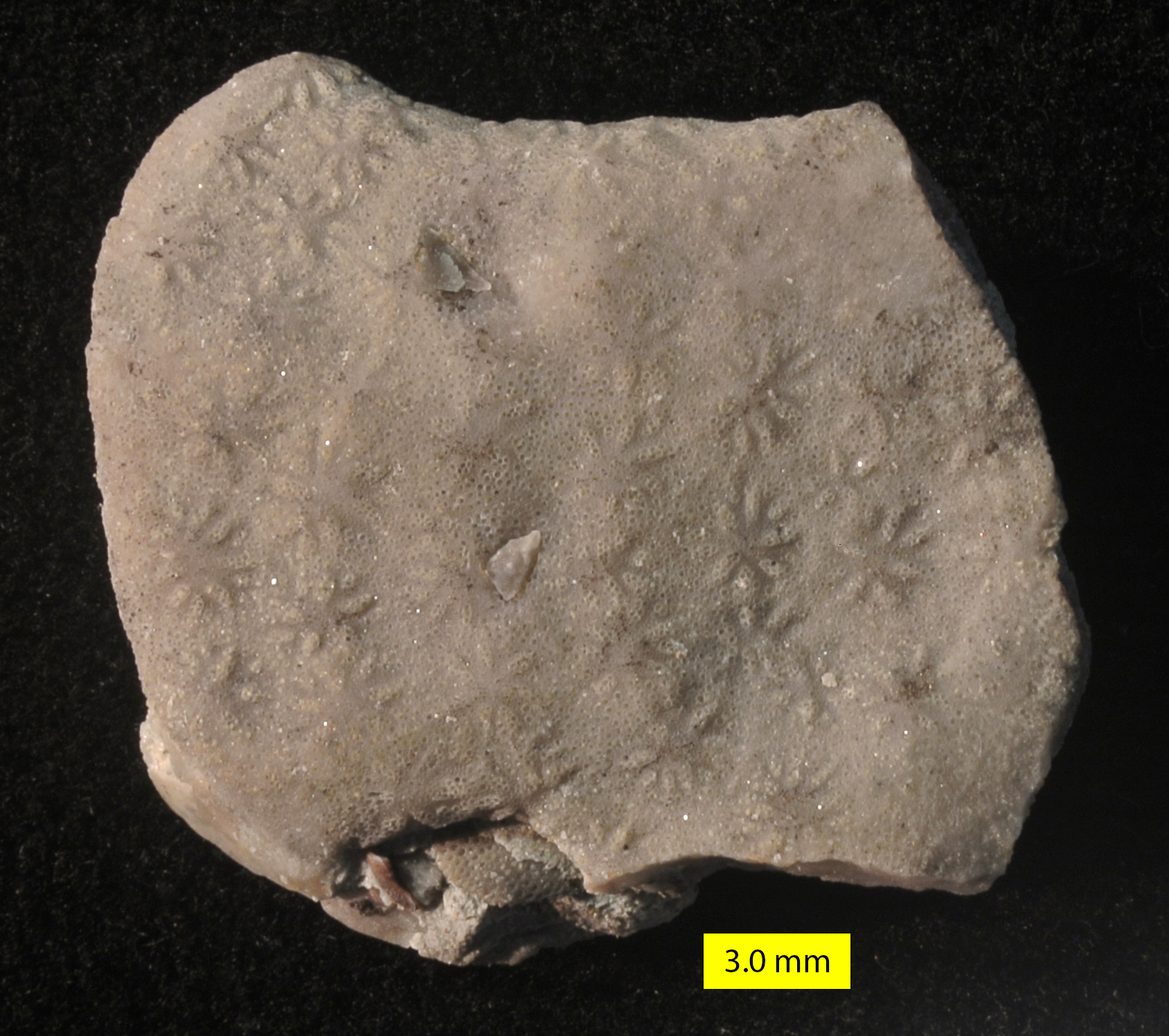
- Fossil of the Ordovician bryozoan Constellaria
  †Constellaria
- †Contignatiospongia – type locality for genus
  - †Contignatiospongia nevadensis – type locality for species
- †Conularia
- †Cooleyella
  - †Cooleyella duffini
- †Coosia
  - †Coosia longocula – type locality for species
- †Cordillerastraea
  - †Cordillerastraea complexa
  - †Cordillerastraea nevadaensis – type locality for species
  - †Cordillerastraea nevadensis
- †Cordylodus
  - †Cordylodus angulatus
  - †Cordylodus intermedius
  - †Cordylodus lindstomi
  - †Cordylodus proavus
- †Cornuodus
- Cornuspira
- †Cornwallatia – type locality for genus
  - †Cornwallatia tabularia – type locality for species
- †Cortezorthis
  - †Cortezorthis cortezensis – type locality for species
- †Corydylodus
- †Corynexochides
  - †Corynexochides prolatus
- †Corynexochoides
  - †Corynexochoides prolatus
- †Costatumulus
  - †Costatumulus altissima
- †Costellarina
  - †Costellarina kaasai
  - †Costellarina plasi
- †Costipelagiella
  - †Costipelagiella nevadense – type locality for species
- †Costispirifer
- †Cothurnocysts
  - †Cothurnocysts saukia – type locality for species
- †Cranaena
- †Crassialveolites
  - †Crassialveolites dubatalovi – or unidentified comparable form
- †Crassifimbra
  - †Crassifimbra walcotti
- †Cravenoceras
  - †Cravenoceras friscoense
- †Crenispirifer – tentative report
- †Crimites
  - †Crimites elkoensis – type locality for species
- †Criteriognathus
  - †Criteriognathus eurekaensis
- †Crurithyris
  - †Crurithyris calendae
  - †Crurithyris expansa
  - †Crurithyris fissa – type locality for species
  - †Crurithyris planoconvexa
  - †Crurithyris wampensis
- †Cryptolithoides
  - †Cryptolithoides fittsi
  - †Cryptolithoides reticulatus
- †Cryptolithus
- †Cryptophyllus
- †Ctenalosia
  - †Ctenalosia fixata
- †Ctenodonta
- †Culumbodina
  - †Culumbodina occidentalis
- †Culumbodine
  - †Culumbodine penna
- †Cuparius
  - †Cuparius cardilatus
- †Curtoceras
- †Cyathaxonia
- †Cyathophycus
  - †Cyathophycus pseudoreticulatus – type locality for species
  - †Cyathophycus reticulatus – tentative report
- †Cyathophyllum
  - †Cyathophyllum eurekaense
- †Cybeloides
- †Cybelopsis
- †Cybelurus
  - †Cybelurus halo
- †Cymbidium
- †Cypricardella
  - †Cypricardella connata
  - †Cypricardella striata – or unidentified related form
- †Cypricardinia
  - †Cypricardinia moorefieldana – or unidentified related form
- †Cyptendoceras
  - †Cyptendoceras kirki – type locality for species
  - †Cyptendoceras rhythmicum – type locality for species
- †Cyrtia
- †Cyrtina
  - †Cyrtina caroline
  - †Cyrtina neogenes
  - †Cyrtina varia – or unidentified comparable form
- †Cyrtinaella
  - †Cyrtinaella causa – type locality for species
- †Cyrtinoides
  - †Cyrtinoides septata
- †Cyrtoniodus
  - †Cyrtoniodus flexuosus
- †Cyrtonotella
  - †Cyrtonotella fasciculata – or unidentified related form
- †Cyrtorostra
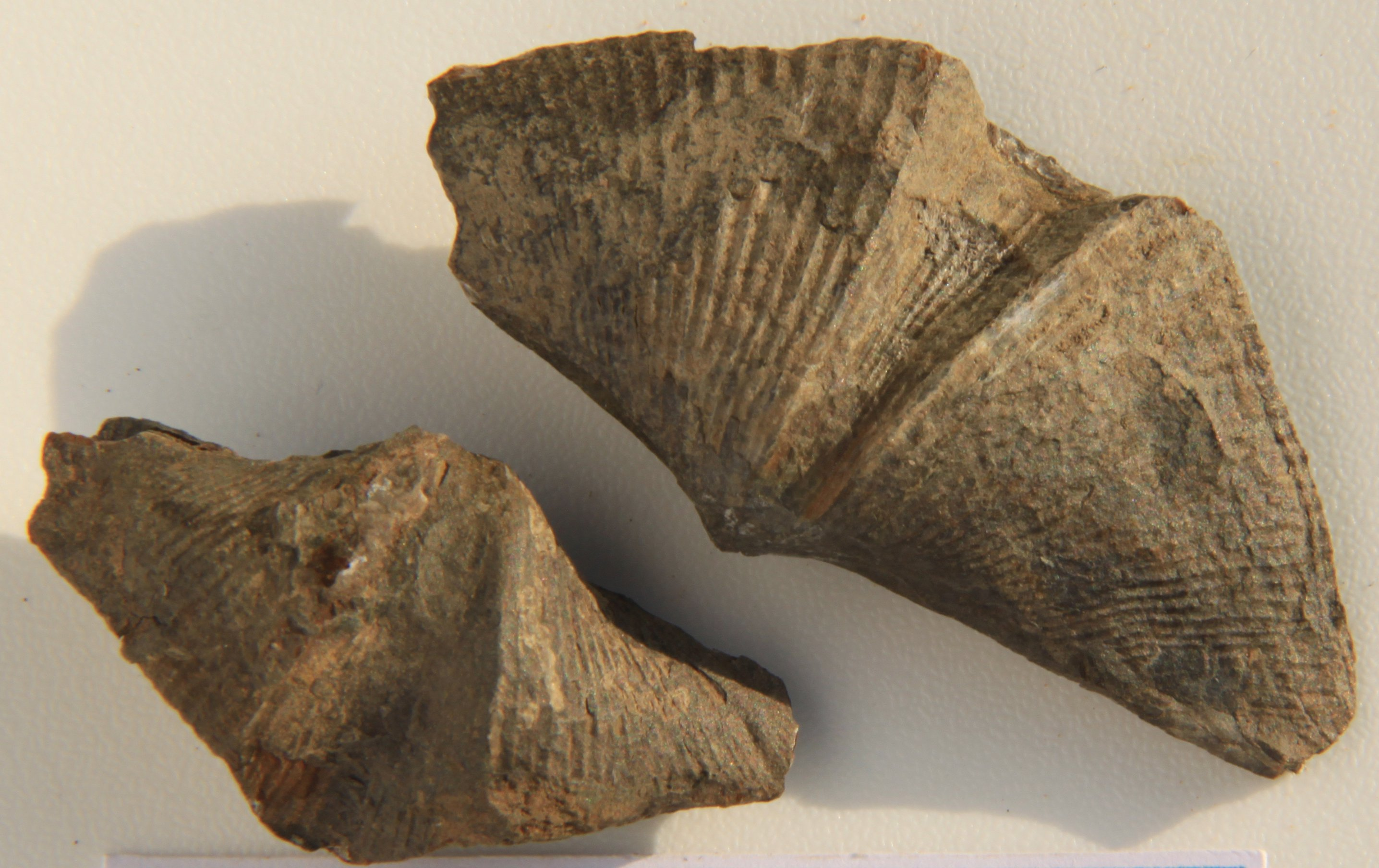
- Fossilized shells of the Middle-Late Devonian brachiopod Cyrtospirifer
  †Cyrtospirifer
  - †Cyrtospirifer breviposticus
  - †Cyrtospirifer portae – or unidentified comparable form
  - †Cyrtospirifer whitneyi
- †Cyrtothoracoceras
- †Cystiphylloides
- †Cystodictya
- †Cytherellina
  - †Cytherellina obusa

== D ==
- †Dactyletes
- †Dactylogonia
  - †Dactylogonia vespertina
- †Dactylotreta
  - †Dactylotreta elegantula – type locality for species
- †Dalejina
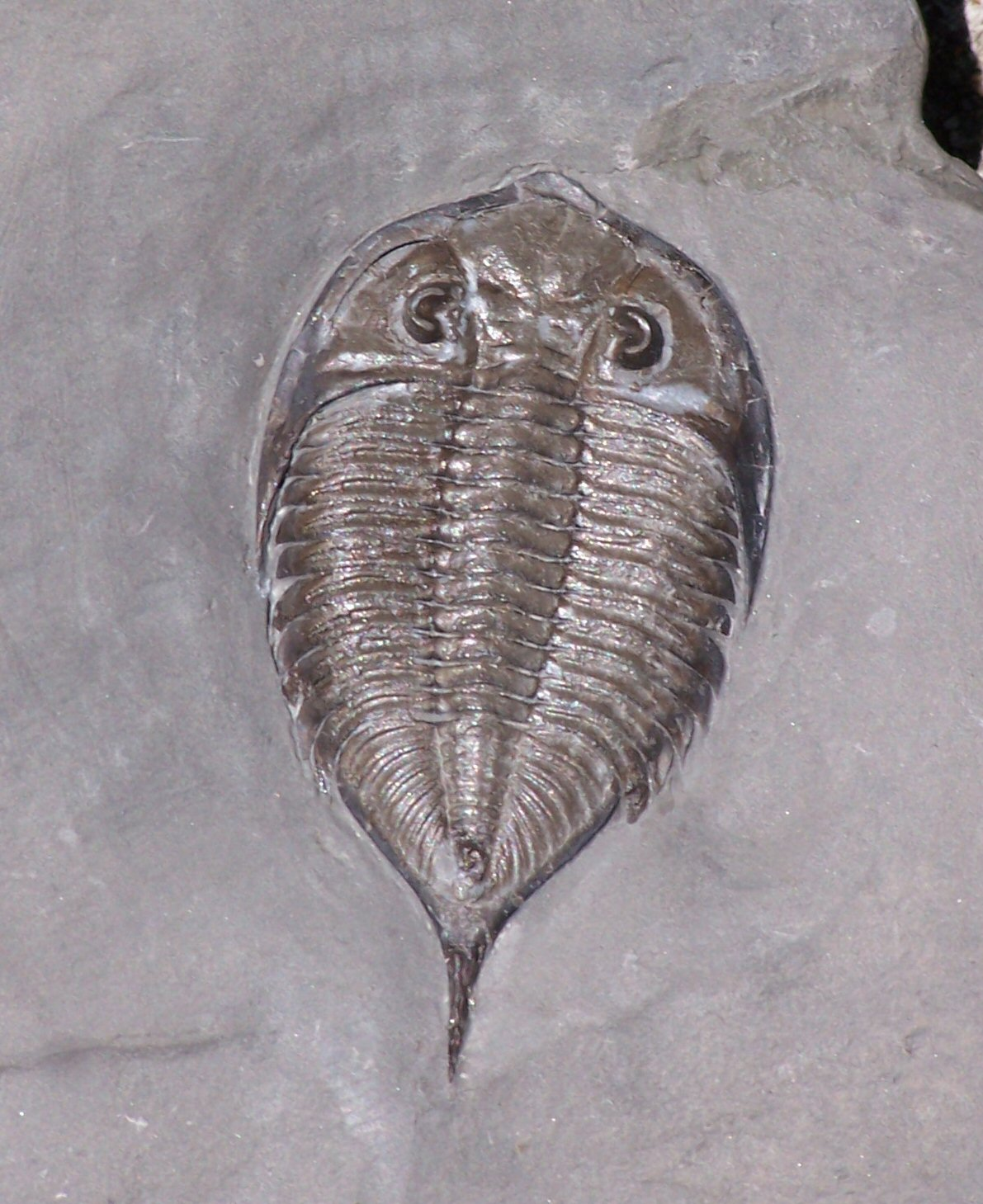
- Fossil of the Late Ordovician-Middle Devonian trilobite Dalmanites
  †Dalmanites
- †Dapsilodus
  - †Dapsilodus obliquicostatus
- †Daraelites
  - †Daraelites leonardensis
- †Davidsonia
  - †Davidsonia antelopensis
- †Deceptrix
- †Dechenella
- †Decoranewsomites
  - †Decoranewsomites angelicus
- †Decoriconus
  - †Decoriconus fragilis
- †Decorospira – type locality for genus
  - †Decorospira rigbyi – type locality for species
- †Delamarella – type locality for genus
  - †Delamarella breispinaspis
  - †Delamarella brevispinaspis – type locality for species
- †Delaria
  - †Delaria sevilloidia
  - †Delaria snowi
- †Dellea – tentative report
  - †Dellea punctata
- †Delmarella – type locality for genus
  - †Delmarella brevispinaspis – type locality for species
- †Delocrinus
  - †Delocrinus graphicus – or unidentified related form
  - †Delocrinus vastus
- †Delthyris
- †Denayella
  - †Denayella housei – type locality for species
- Dentalium
- †Derbyia
  - †Derbyia crassa
  - †Derbyia subcircularis
  - †Derbyia sulca
  - †Derbyia wabaunseensis
- †Desatrypa
  - †Desatrypa copperi
- †Desmoinesia
  - †Desmoinesia ingrata
  - †Desmoinesia nana
- †Desmorthis
  - †Desmorthis costata
  - †Desmorthis crassus
  - †Desmorthis nevadensis
  - †Desmorthis planus
- †Devonalosia – tentative report
- †Devonoproductus
  - †Devonoproductus hallanus
  - †Devonoproductus minimus – or unidentified comparable form
- †Diacanthaspis – tentative report
- †Dianulites
- †Diaphragmaphyllum
  - †Diaphragmaphyllum grossum – or unidentified related form
- †Diaphragmus
  - †Diaphragmus phillipsi
- †Dicanthopyge
  - †Dicanthopyge convergens
  - †Dicanthopyge quadrata
  - †Dicanthopyge reductus
- †Dicellograptus
  - †Dicellograptus alector – type locality for species
  - †Dicellograptus anceps
  - †Dicellograptus complanatus
  - †Dicellograptus divaricatus – or unidentified comparable form
  - †Dicellograptus minor
  - †Dicellograptus mirabilis
  - †Dicellograptus ornatus
  - †Dicellograptus sextans
  - †Dicellograptus tumidus
  - †Dicellograptus turgidus
- †Diceratograptus
  - †Diceratograptus mirus
- †Diceromyonia
  - †Diceromyonia ignota
- †Dichognathus
  - †Dichognathus typica
- †Dichogranthus
- †Dicoelosia
  - †Dicoelosia biloba
- †Dicranograptus
- †Dictyoclostus
- †Dictyonema
- †Dictytonina
  - †Dictytonina pannula
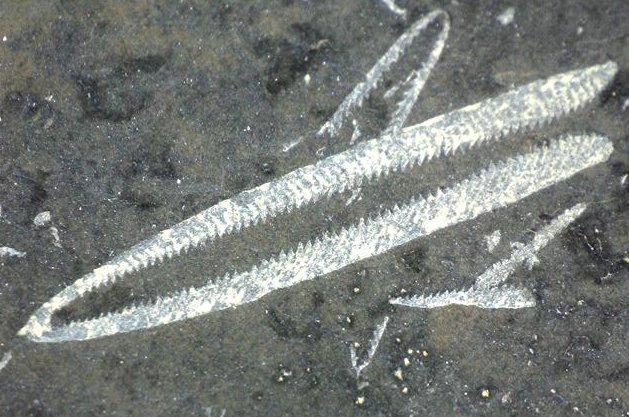
- Fossil of the Middle Ordovician graptolite Didymograptus
  †Didymograptus
  - †Didymograptus artus
  - †Didymograptus protobifidus
- †Dielasma
  - †Dielasma diabloense – or unidentified comparable form
  - †Dielasma phosphoriense
- †Dimegelasma
  - †Dimegelasma eurekensis – type locality for species
- †Dimeropyge – tentative report
- †Dimeropygiella
  - †Dimeropygiella caudanodosa
  - †Dimeropygiella ovata
- †Dimorphoceras
- †Dinorthis
  - †Dinorthis occidentalis
- †Diparelasma
  - †Diparelasma typicum – or unidentified comparable form
- †Diplocyathellus
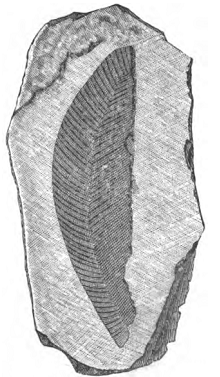
- Cambrian graptolite Diplograptus
  †Diplograptus
  - †Diplograptus rarithecatus
  - †Diplograptus rigidus
- †Diplotrypa
- †Discomyorthis
  - †Discomyorthis musculosa
- †Disphyllum
- †Distacodus
  - †Distacodus symmetricus
- †Distomodus
- †Divaricospongia – type locality for genus
  - †Divaricospongia dilata – type locality for species
- †Dokimocephalus
  - †Dokimocephalus pernasutus
- †Dolerorthis
  - †Dolerorthis flabellites
- †Donaldiella
  - †Donaldiella cicelia
- †Donaldina
- †Donaldospira
  - †Donaldospira geminocarinata – or unidentified comparable form
- †Dorlodotia
- †Dorytreta – tentative report
- †Drepanodus
  - †Drepanodus subarcuatus
- †Drepanoistodus
  - †Drepanoistodus deltife
  - †Drepanoistodus suberectus
- †Droharhynchia
  - †Droharhynchia intermissa
- †Dunbarella
- †Dunderbergia
  - †Dunderbergia anyta
  - †Dunderbergia bigranulosa
  - †Dunderbergia brevispina
  - †Dunderbergia calculosa
  - †Dunderbergia nitida
  - †Dunderbergia polybothra
  - †Dunderbergia variagranula
- †Durhamina
  - †Durhamina cordillerensis – type locality for species
  - †Durhamina moormanensis – type locality for species
  - †Durhamina primitiva – type locality for species
  - †Durhamina richi
  - †Durhamina snyderi – type locality for species
  - †Durhamina sublaeve
- †Dvorakia
- †Dyoros
  - †Dyoros nevadaensis – type locality for species
  - †Dyoros type locality for species A – informal
- †Dyscritella
  - †Dyscritella acanthostylia – type locality for species
- †Dyticospirifer – type locality for genus
  - †Dyticospirifer mccolleyensis – type locality for species
- †Dytremacephalus
  - †Dytremacephalus asperaxis
  - †Dytremacephalus granulosus

== E ==
- †Earlandia
  - †Earlandia vulgaris
- †Ecculiomphalus
  - †Ecculiomphalus harrisae
- †Eccyliopterus
- Echidnina
  - †Echidnina bengstoni – type locality for species
- †Echinalosia
  - †Echinalosia type locality for species A – informal
- †Echinaria
  - †Echinaria knighti
  - †Echinaria semipunctata – or unidentified comparable form
- †Echinauris
  - †Echinauris magna
  - †Echinauris subhorrida – type locality for species
- †Echinocoelia
  - †Echinocoelia careocamera
  - †Echinocoelia denayensis
  - †Echinocoelia williamsi
- †Echinoconchus
  - †Echinoconchus biseriatus – or unidentified related form
  - †Echinoconchus elegans
  - †Echinoconchus semipunctatus
  - †Echinoconchus vittatus – or unidentified related form
- †Ecnomiophyllum – type locality for genus
  - †Ecnomiophyllum fascis – type locality for species
  - †Ecnomiophyllum merriami – type locality for species
  - †Ecnomiophyllum simpsoni
- †Ectenonotus
  - †Ectenonotus westoni – or unidentified comparable form
  - †Ectenonotus whittingtoni
  - †Ectenonotus whittingtonia
- †Ectenotus – tentative report
- †Ectoprimitia
- †Edmondia
- †Egania – type locality for genus
  - †Egania typicalis – type locality for species
- †Egorovia
  - †Egorovia longituda – or unidentified related form
- †Egosiella – tentative report
- †Ehmaniella
  - †Ehmaniella angustigena
  - †Ehmaniella fronsplanata
- †Ekeraspis
  - †Ekeraspis floweri
  - †Ekeraspis nevadensis
- †Ekteinocrinus
  - †Ekteinocrinus battleshipensis
- †Ekvasophyllum
- †Elassocrinus
  - †Elassocrinus cyathus
  - †Elassocrinus delicatulus
  - †Elassocrinus inornatus
  - †Elassocrinus nodosus
- †Elburgia
  - †Elburgia granulosa
  - †Elburgia quinnensis
- †Eleutherokomma
  - †Eleutherokomma impennis – or unidentified comparable form
- †Eleutherospira
  - †Eleutherospira sinistralis – type locality for species
- †Elibatocrinus
  - †Elibatocrinus elongatus
- †Eliorhynchus
  - †Eliorhynchus castanea
  - †Eliorhynchus nevadensis
- †Elita
- †Elkoceras – type locality for genus
  - †Elkoceras volborthi – type locality for species
- †Elliottella
  - †Elliottella multicostata – or unidentified related form
- †Elrathina
  - †Elrathina antiqua
  - †Elrathina wheelera
- †Elvania
- †Elvinia
  - †Elvinia roemeri
- †Elviniella
  - †Elviniella laevis
- †Elythyna
- †Emanuella
  - †Emanuella meristoides
- †Embolophyllum
  - †Embolophyllum carbonense – type locality for species
- †Emmonsia
- †Enantiosphenella
  - †Enantiosphenella cybele
- †Encrinuroides
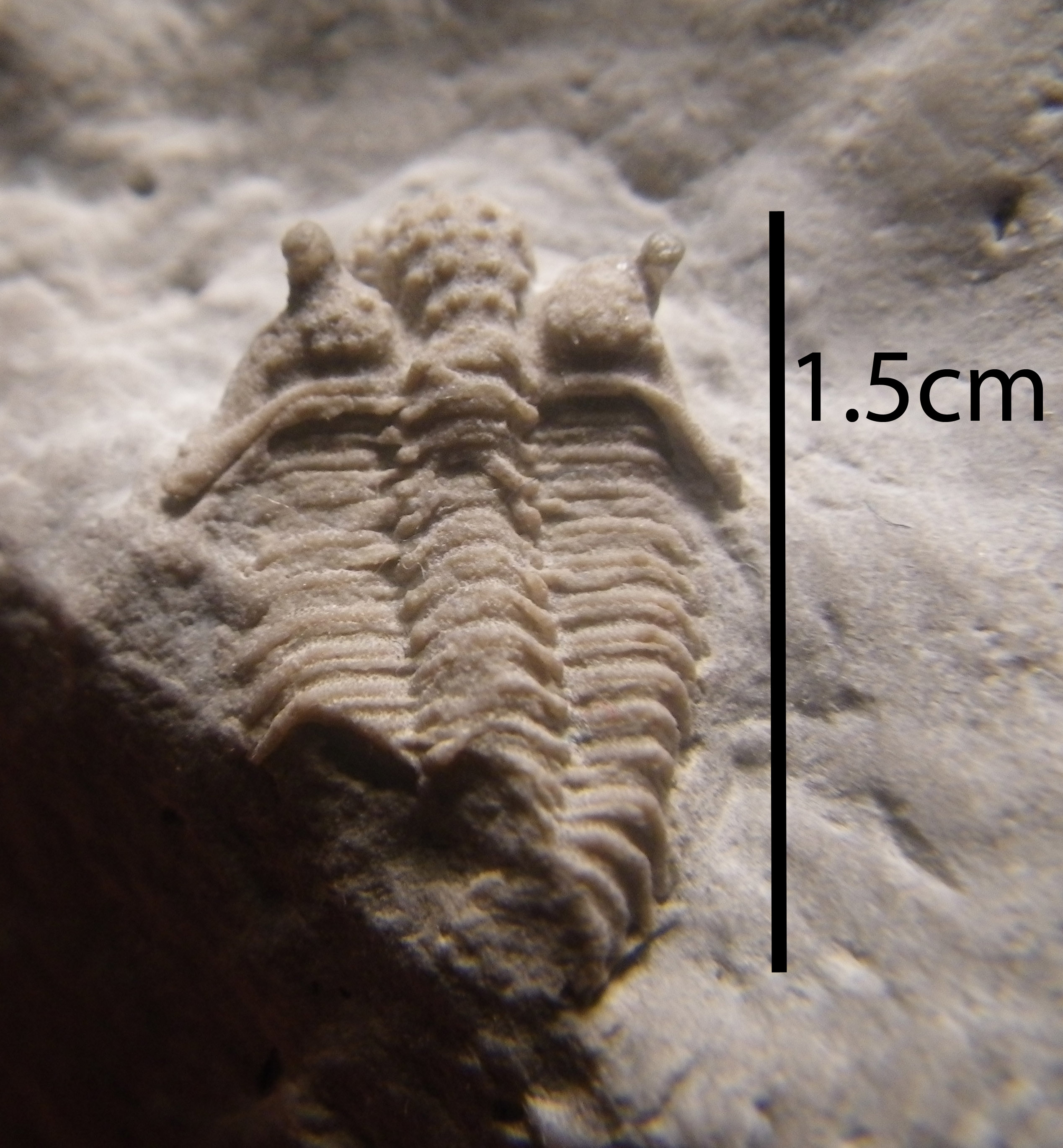
- Fossil of the Middle Ordovician-Early Devonian trilobite Encrinurus
  †Encrinurus
- †Endelocrinus
  - †Endelocrinus torus
- †Endophyllum
- †Endothyra
  - †Endothyra bowmani – or unidentified related form
  - †Endothyra excellens
  - †Endothyra maxima
  - †Endothyra pandorae
  - †Endothyra phrissa
  - †Endothyra prisca – or unidentified loosely related form
  - †Endothyra tantala
- †Endothyranella
- †Endothyranopsis
  - †Endothyranopsis compressus
  - †Endothyranopsis crassus
  - †Endothyranopsis scitula
- †Endymionia
  - †Endymionia meeki – or unidentified comparable form
- †Entactinia
  - †Entactinia spongia – tentative report
  - †Entactinia sublata – or unidentified related form
- †Enteletes
- †Entogonites
- †Eoangyomphalus
  - †Eoangyomphalus klapperi – type locality for species
- †Eochonetes
- †Eoendothyrandopsis
- †Eoendothyranopsis
  - †Eoendothyranopsis donica
  - †Eoendothyranopsis ermakiensis
  - †Eoendothyranopsis robusta – or unidentified related form
  - †Eoendothyranopsis scitula
- †Eofallotaspis – or unidentified comparable form
- †Eofalodus
  - †Eofalodus brevis
- †Eofletcheria
- †Eoglossinotoechia
- †Eokochaspis – type locality for genus
  - †Eokochaspis cabinensis
  - †Eokochaspis delamarensis
  - †Eokochaspis granulosa – type locality for species
  - †Eokochaspis longspina
  - †Eokochaspis metalaspis – type locality for species
  - †Eokochaspis nodosa – type locality for species
  - †Eokochaspis piochensis
- †Eoleperditia
  - †Eoleperditia bivia
- †Eolissochonetes
  - †Eolissochonetes keyesi
- †Eomarginifera
  - †Eomarginifera haydensis – or unidentified comparable form
- †Eoparafusulina
  - †Eoparafusulina bellula – type locality for species
  - †Eoparafusulina concisa – type locality for species
  - †Eoparafusulina spissa
- †Eoplectodona
- †Eoplectodonta
  - †Eoplectodonta alternata
- †Eopteria
  - †Eopteria richardsoni – or unidentified comparable form
- †Eoptychoparia – or unidentified comparable form
  - †Eoptychoparia piochensis
- †Eorobergia
- †Eoschubertella
- †Eoschuchertella
- †Eospirifer
- †Eostaffella
  - †Eostaffella tortula
- †Eotetragraptus
- †Eothele
  - †Eothele spurri
- †Eotuberitina
- †Epiphyton
  - †Epiphyton pencillatum – or unidentified comparable form
- †Epistacheoides
- †Eridoconcha
- †Eridopora
- †Eriella – tentative report
- †Erisocrinus
  - †Erisocrinus longwelli
- †Erixanium
  - †Erixanium brachyaxis
  - †Erixanium carinatum
  - †Erixanium multisegmentus
- †Eroicaspira
  - †Eroicaspira simulatrix
- †Esmeraldina
  - †Esmeraldina cometes – type locality for species
  - †Esmeraldina elliptica
  - †Esmeraldina lidensis – type locality for species
  - †Esmeraldina rowei
- †Ethmophyllum
- †Euconia – tentative report
- †Eugonophyllum
- †Eukrinaster
  - †Eukrinaster ibexensis
- †Eumetria
  - †Eumetria acutirostra – or unidentified comparable form
- †Eumorphoceras
  - †Eumorphoceras bisulcatum
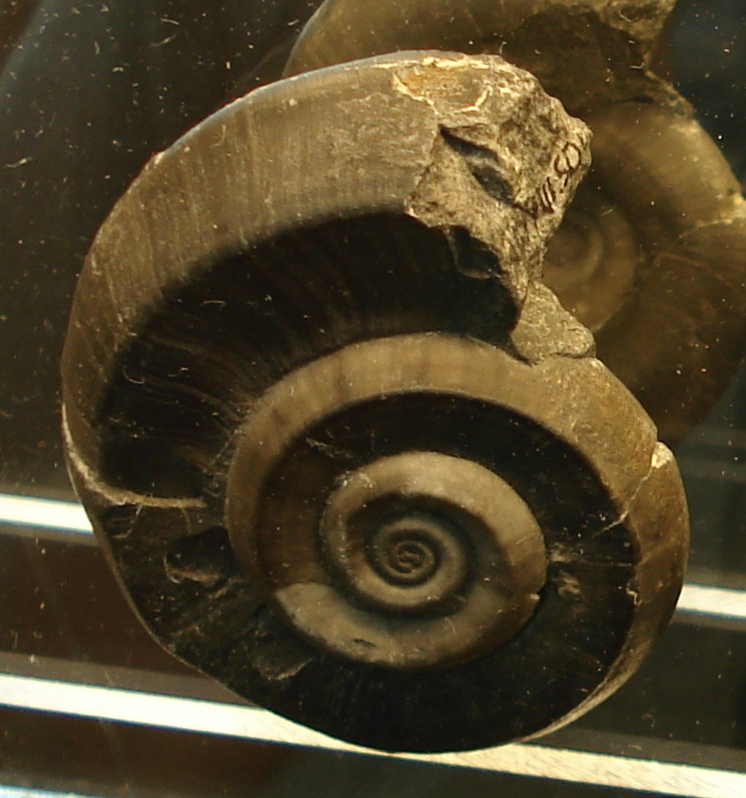
- Fossilized shell of the Silurian-Permian sea snail Euomphalus
  †Euomphalus
  - †Euomphalus latus
  - †Euomphalus pancakensis – type locality for species
- †Euphemites
  - †Euphemites crenulatus
  - †Euphemites kingi
  - †Euphemites nevadensis – type locality for species
- †Euphemitopsis
  - †Euphemitopsis subpapillosa
- †Euptychaspis
- †Eurekablastus – type locality for genus
  - †Eurekablastus ninemilensis – type locality for species
- †Eurekaspirifer – type locality for genus
  - †Eurekaspirifer pinyonensis
- †Eurekia
- †Eurychilina
- †Euryzone – tentative report
- †Eustypocystis
  - †Eustypocystis minor
- †Evanescirostrum
  - †Evanescirostrum glabraventra
- †Exochops
  - †Exochops portlocki
- †Exocrinus
  - †Exocrinus moorei

== F ==
- †Faberophyllum
- †Fallotaspidia
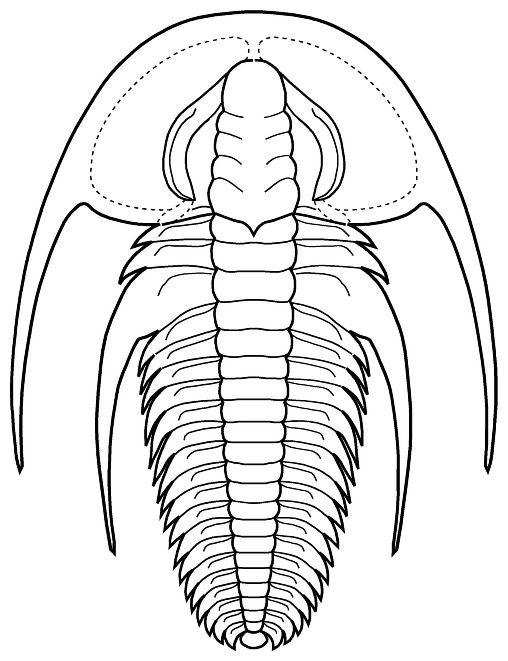
- Illustration of a fossil of the Cambrian trilobite Fallotaspis
  †Fallotaspis
  - †Fallotaspis bondoni – or unidentified comparable form
- †Favosites
- †Fenestella
  - †Fenestella stocktenensis
- †Fenestrellina
- †Fenestrocyathus
- †Ferganella
  - †Ferganella borealis
- †Fieldaspis
  - †Fieldaspis bilobata
  - †Fieldaspis celer
  - †Fieldaspis superba
- †Fimbrinia
  - †Fimbrinia plummeri
- †Finkelnburgia – tentative report
  - †Finkelnburgia scenidioides – or unidentified comparable form
- †Fistellaspongia – type locality for genus
  - †Fistellaspongia inclinata – type locality for species
- †Fistulipora
  - †Fistulipora bifoliatus
- †Fistutlipora
  - †Fistutlipora lamellatis
- †Flabellitesia
  - †Flabellitesia flabellites
- †Flexaria
  - †Flexaria arkansana
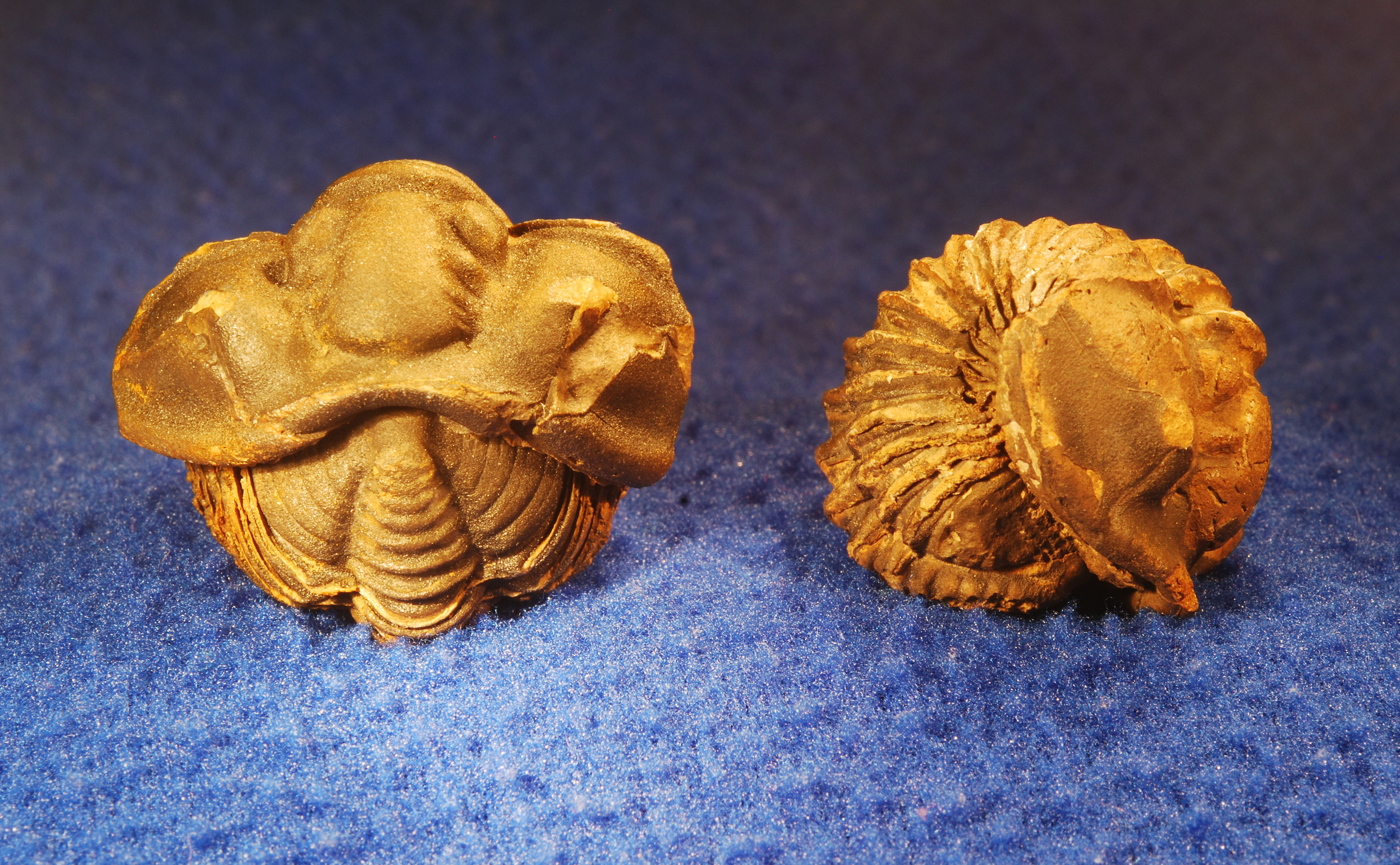
- Front (left) and right side (right) views of an enrolled fossil of the Middle Ordovician-Silurian trilobite Flexicalymene
  †Flexicalymene
- †Fomichevella
  - †Fomichevella nevadensis – type locality for species
  - †Fomichevella schrenki
  - †Fomichevella waltersi – type locality for species
- †Fremontia
- †Freontia
- †Fritzaspis
  - †Fritzaspis generalis
  - †Fritzaspis ovalis
- †Fusulinella
  - †Fusulinella acuminata
  - †Fusulinella fugax

== G ==
- †Gabelia – type locality for genus
  - †Gabelia fascicula
  - †Gabelia giganta
  - †Gabelia intermedia – type locality for species
  - †Gabelia pedunculus – type locality for species
- †Gacella – tentative report
- †Gallatinospongia
  - †Gallatinospongia conica
- †Gamachignathus
  - †Gamachignathus ensifer
- †Gasterocoma
  - †Gasterocoma bicaula – type locality for species
- †Gattendorfia – tentative report
- †Genalaticurus
  - †Genalaticurus genalatus – or unidentified comparable form
- †Gennaeocrinus
  - †Gennaeocrinus maxwelli – type locality for species
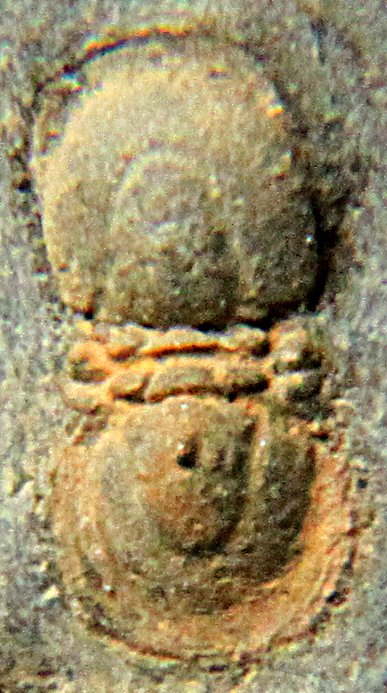
- Fossil of the Early-Late Ordovician trilobite Geragnostus
  †Geragnostus
- †Geraldinella
- †Geranocephalus
  - †Geranocephalus truncatus
- †Girtyana
  - †Girtyana stellara – type locality for species
- †Girtyoceras
  - †Girtyoceras hamiltonense – type locality for species
- †Girtypecten
- †Girvanella
- †Glabrocingulum
  - †Glabrocingulum quadrigatum
- †Glaphurochiton – tentative report
- †Glaphurus
- †Glaphyraspis
  - †Glaphyraspis ornata
- †Glassia
  - †Glassia triangulata
- †Globivalvulina – tentative report
- †Globoendothyra
  - †Globoendothyra tomiliensis – or unidentified related form
- Glomospira
- †Glossopleura
  - †Glossopleura lodensis
  - †Glossopleura tuta
  - †Glossopleura walcotti
- †Glyphaspis
  - †Glyphaspis concavus
- †Glyptagnostus
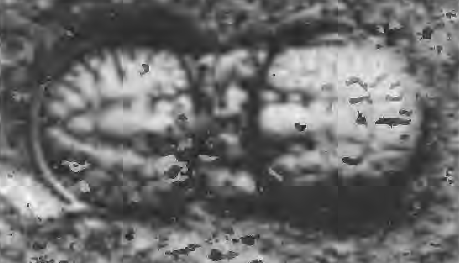
  - Fossil of the Cambrian trilobite Glyptagnostus
    †Glyptagnostus reticulatus
- †Glyptograptus
- †Glyptomena – tentative report
- †Glyptorthis
- †Glyptospira
  - †Glyptospira arelela – type locality for species
- †Gnathodus
  - †Gnathodus muricatus
  - †Gnathodus simplex – or unidentified related form
- †Gogia
  - †Gogia longidactylus
- †Goldfieldia – type locality for genus
  - †Goldfieldia pacifica – type locality for species
- †Goniasma
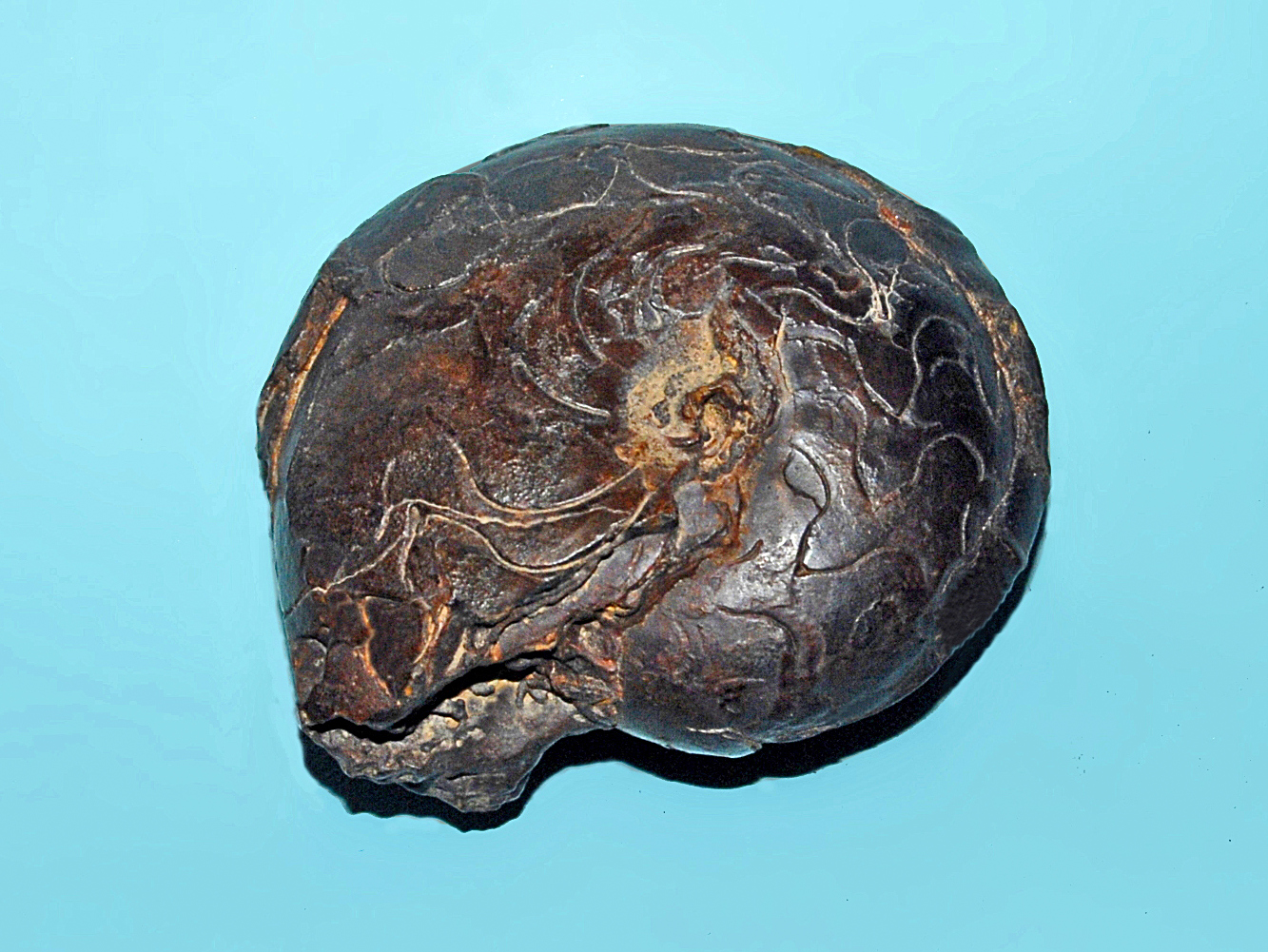
- Fossilized shell of the Late Devonian-Late Triassic ammonoid cephalopod Goniatites
  †Goniatites
  - †Goniatites americanus
  - †Goniatites deceptus
  - †Goniatites eganensis – type locality for species
  - †Goniatites sowerbyi – type locality for species
- †Goniophrys – tentative report
- †Goniotelina
  - †Goniotelina ensifer
- †Goniotrypa
- †Gosseletina – tentative report
- †Grabaulites
  - †Grabaulites jacksoni – or unidentified comparable form
- †Gracianella
- †Grammatodon
  - †Grammatodon politus
- †Grandaurispina – or unidentified comparable form
  - †Grandaurispina type locality for species A – informal
- †Grandinasus
  - †Grandinasus argentus
  - †Grandinasus auricampus
  - †Grandinasus patulus
- †Granulifera
  - †Granulifera granulosa
- †Graphiocrinus
  - †Graphiocrinus scopulus
- †Graphiodactyllis
- †Groomodiscus – type locality for genus
  - †Groomodiscus rossi – type locality for species
- †Grovesella
  - †Grovesella nevadensis – type locality for species
  - †Grovesella tabasensis
- †Gryphochiton
  - †Gryphochiton distinctus – type locality for species
- †Grypophyllum
- †Gypidula
  - †Gypidula loweryi
  - †Gypidula praeloweryi – type locality for species
  - †Gypidula pseudogaleata – or unidentified comparable form
- †Gypidulina
  - †Gypidulina Sp. C – informal
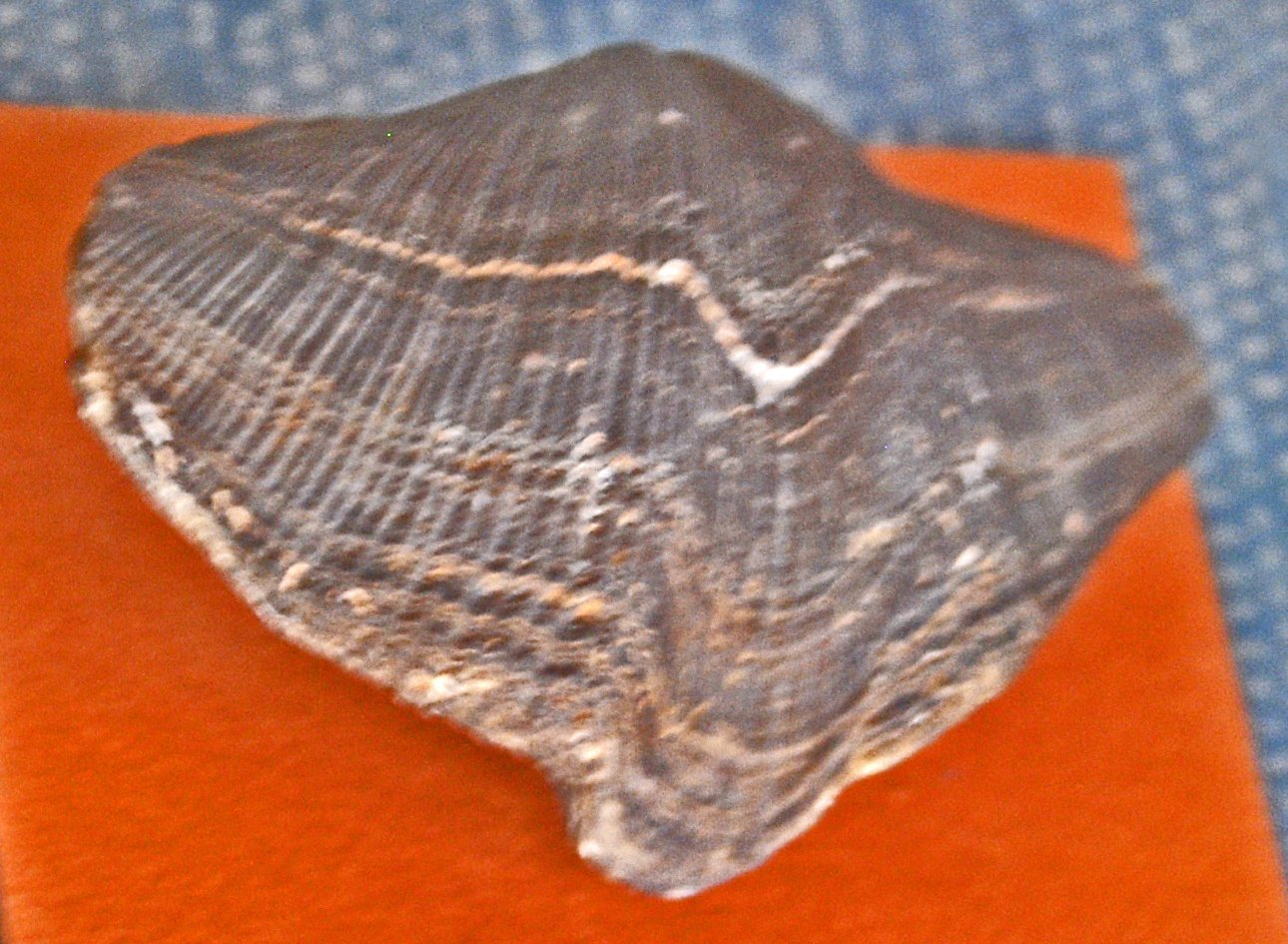
- Fossilized shell of the Carboniferous-Permian brachiopod Gypospirifer
  †Gypospirifer
  - †Gypospirifer infraplicus – or unidentified comparable form

== H ==
- †Hadrocephalites
  - †Hadrocephalites lyndonensis
  - †Hadrocephalites rhytidodes
- †Hadropipetta
  - †Hadropipetta nevadensis – type locality for species
- †Hadrorhynchia
  - †Hadrorhynchia sandersoni
- †Hadrotreta
  - †Hadrotreta primaaea
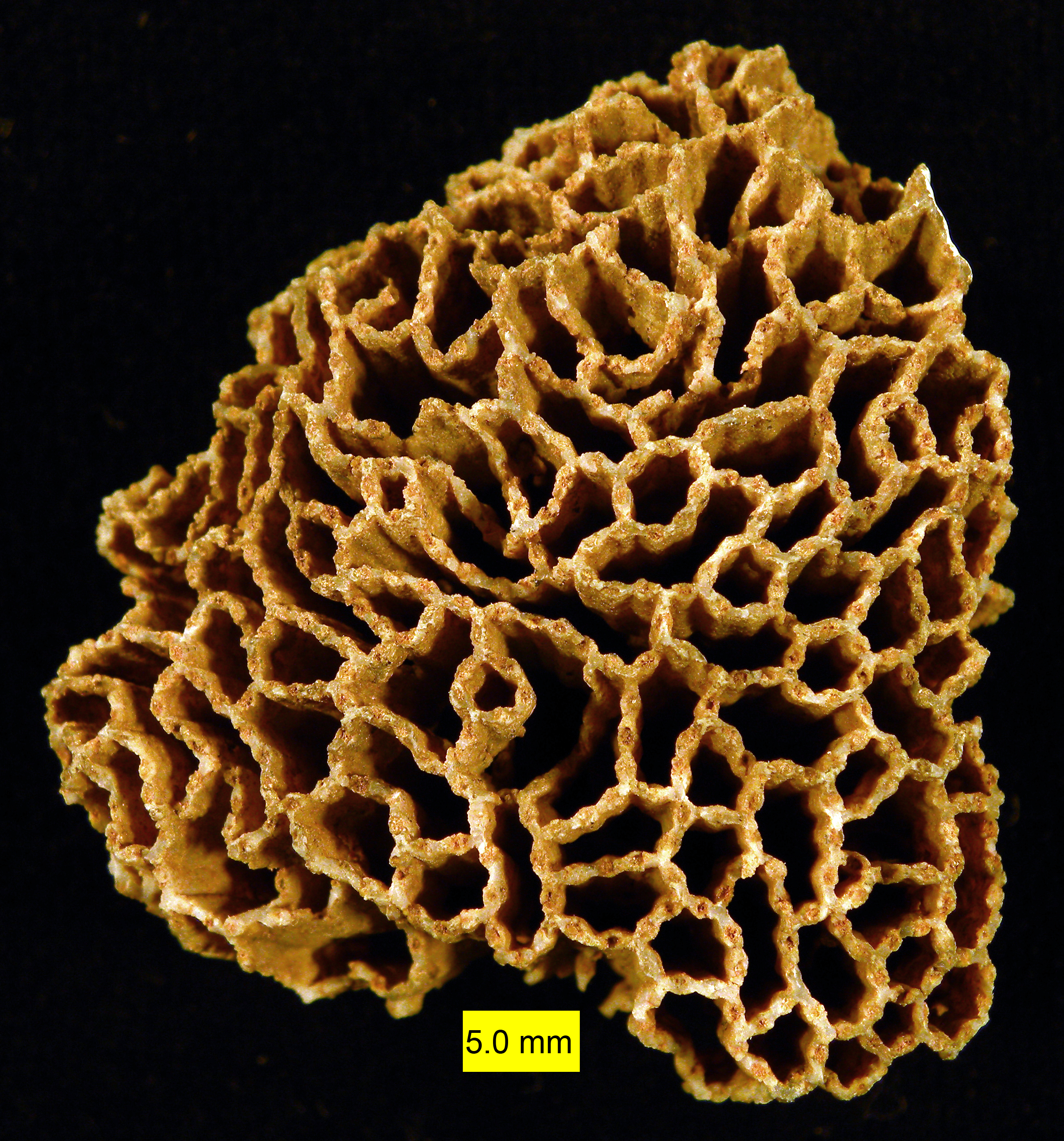
- Fossil of the Ordovician-Silurian tabulate coral Halysites
  †Halysites
- †Hamarodus
  - †Hamarodus europaeus
- †Hammatospira – type locality for genus
  - †Hammatospira bellula – type locality for species
- †Hammatostroma
- †Haplistion
  - †Haplistion aeluroglossa
  - †Haplistion sphaericum – or unidentified comparable form
- †Hapsiphyllum
- †Hardyoides
  - †Hardyoides mimicus
- †Harklessia – type locality for genus
  - †Harklessia yuenglingensis – type locality for species
- †Harpillaenus
  - †Harpillaenus rossi – type locality for species
- †Hebetoechia
- †Heckethornia
  - †Heckethornia bowiei
  - †Heckethornia hyndeae – type locality for species
  - †Heckethornia morrisseyi
  - †Heckethornia numani – type locality for species
- †Hedeina
- †Hedinaspis
  - †Hedinaspis regalis
- †Hedraites – tentative report
- †Heintzella
  - †Heintzella davydovi – type locality for species
  - †Heintzella playfordi – type locality for species
  - †Heintzella radiata – or unidentified comparable form
  - †Heintzella whitneyi
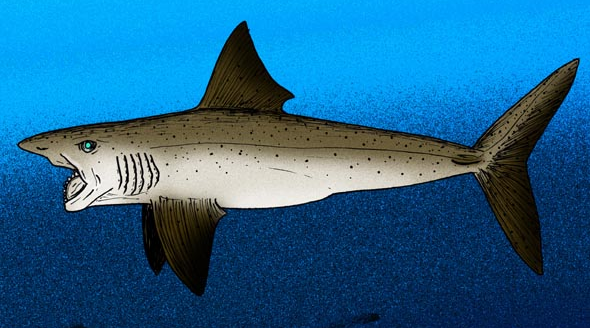
- Life restoration of the Permian Chimaera relative Helicoprion
  †Helicoprion
  - †Helicoprion bessonowi
- †Helicotis – tentative report
- †Helicotoma
- †Heliomera
  - †Heliomera albata – or unidentified comparable form
- †Helminthochiton
- †Hemiarges – tentative report
- †Hemiptychina
  - †Hemiptychina quadricostata
- †Heritschiella
  - †Heritschiella girtyi
- †Hermatostroma
- †Hesperinia
  - †Hesperinia kirki – type locality for species
- †Hesperocoelia
  - †Hesperocoelia typicalis
- †Hesperomena
  - †Hesperomena leptellinoidea
- †Hesperonomia
  - †Hesperonomia antelopensis
  - †Hesperonomia crassa – or unidentified comparable form
  - †Hesperonomia iones
  - †Hesperonomia nemea – or unidentified comparable form
  - †Hesperonomia planidorsalis – or unidentified comparable form
- †Hesperonomiella
  - †Hesperonomiella minor
- †Hesperorthis
  - †Hesperorthis antelopensis – or unidentified comparable form
  - †Hesperorthis matutina – or unidentified comparable form
- †Heteralosia
  - †Heteralosia slocomi
- †Heterelasma
  - †Heterelasma type locality for species A – informal
- †Heterocaninia – tentative report
  - †Heterocaninia langenheimi
- †Heteropecten
  - †Heteropecten vanvleeti
- †Heterophrentis
- †Hexatractiella
  - †Hexatractiella nevadensis
- †Highgatella
  - †Highgatella cordilleri
- †Hillyardina – tentative report
- †Hinganella
  - †Hinganella felderi – type locality for species
- †Hintzeia
  - †Hintzeia celsaora
- †Hiscobeccus
  - †Hiscobeccus capax
  - †Hiscobeccus gigas
- †Holcocystis
  - †Holcocystis flexa
- †Holmiella
  - †Holmiella falx
  - †Holmiella millerensis
- †Homagnostus
  - †Homagnostus comptus – type locality for species
  - †Homagnostus lumidosus
  - †Homagnostus obesus
- †Homograptus
- †Homotelus
- †Homotrypa
- †Housia
  - †Housia ovata
- †Howellella
  - †Howellella cycloptera
  - †Howellella textilis – or unidentified comparable form
- †Hunnebergia – tentative report
- †Hustedia
  - †Hustedia culcitula
  - †Hustedia elongata
  - †Hustedia gibbosa
  - †Hustedia miseri
  - †Hustedia mormoni – or unidentified comparable form
  - †Hustedia rotundi
  - †Hustedia stataria
- †Hyalostelia
- †Hyolithellus
  - †Hyolithellus insolitus
- †Hyolithes
- †Hyperchilarina
- †Hypermecaspis
  - †Hypermecaspis kolouros
- †Hypochilarina – tentative report
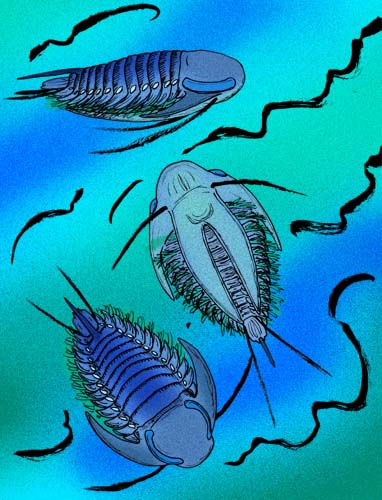
- Life restoration of the Middle Ordovician trilobite Hypodicranotus
  †Hypodicranotus
- †Hypothyridina
- †Hypselentoma – tentative report
- †Hypsiptycha
  - †Hypsiptycha anticostiensis – or unidentified comparable form
- †Hysterolites
- †Hystriculina
  - †Hystriculina hystricula
  - †Hystriculina type locality for species A – informal
  - †Hystriculina wabashensis
- †Hystricurus
  - †Hystricurus oculilunatus – or unidentified comparable form

== I ==
- †Ianthinopsis
- †Iapetognathus
  - †Iapetognathus sprakersi
- †Ichodella
- †Icriodus
  - †Icriodus angustus – or unidentified comparable form
  - †Icriodus brevis
  - †Icriodus difficilis
  - †Icriodus hesperius
  - †Icriodus latericrescens
  - †Icriodus nevadensis
  - †Icriodus norfordi
  - †Icriodus trojani
- †Iddingsia
  - †Iddingsia robusta
  - †Iddingsia similis
- †Idiomesus
- †Idiostroma
- †Idiostrophia
  - †Idiostrophia conciliata
  - †Idiostrophia lenticularis – type locality for species
  - †Idiostrophia nuda
  - †Idiostrophia paucicostata – or unidentified comparable form
  - †Idiostrophia valdari – type locality for species
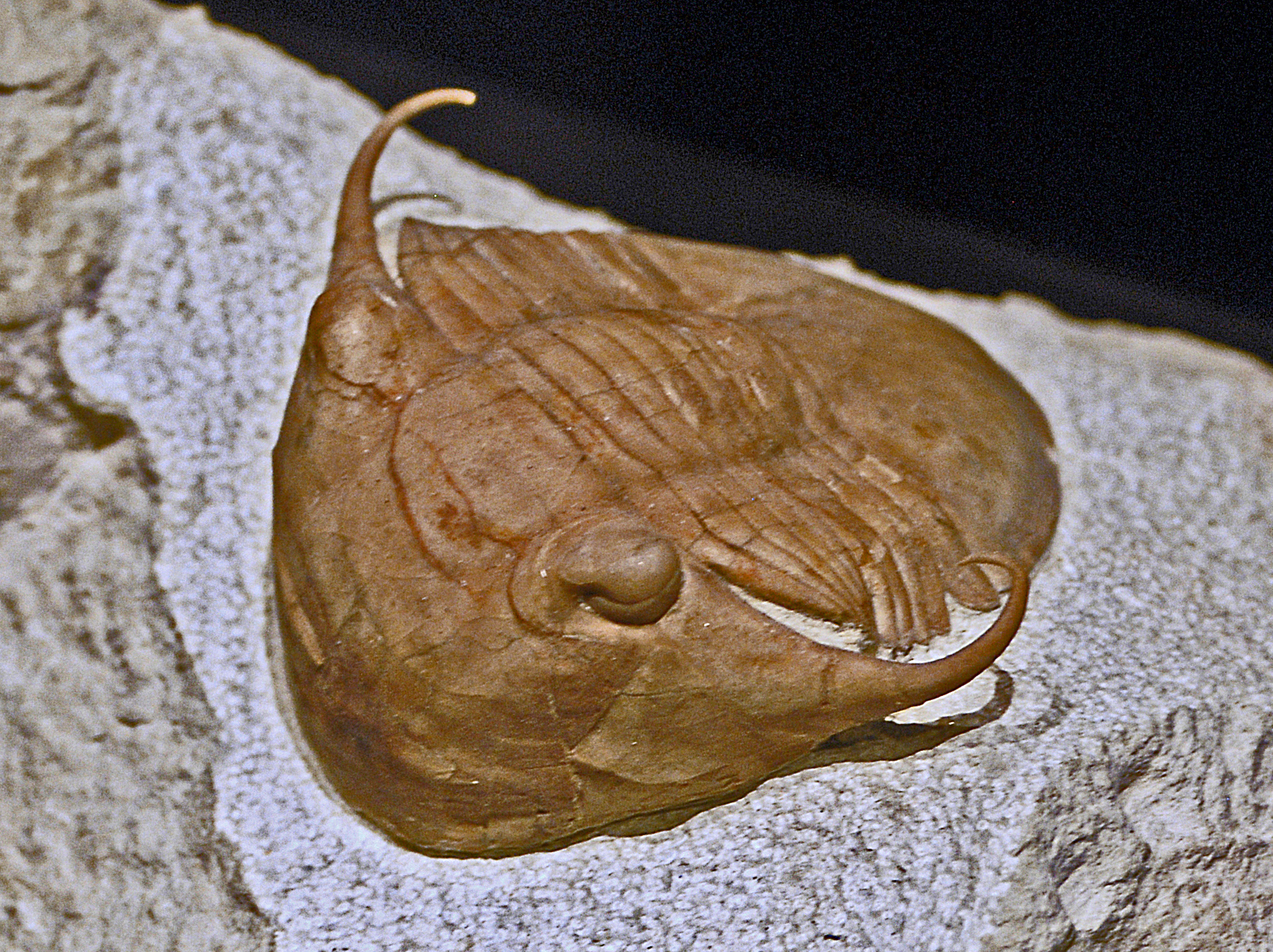
- Fossil of the Middle Ordovician trilobite Illaenus
  †Illaenus
  - †Illaenus alveatus – or unidentified comparable form
  - †Illaenus auriculatus
  - †Illaenus fraternus – or unidentified comparable form
  - †Illaenus oscitatus – tentative report
  - †Illaenus utahensis
- †Ilmenia
- †Imitoceras
- †Indivisia – tentative report
- †Inflatia
- †Ingria
  - †Ingria cloudi
- †Innitagnostus
  - †Innitagnostus inexpectans
- †Intomodesma – tentative report
- †Invertrypa
  - †Invertrypa subnuba
  - †Invertrypa talis – type locality for species
- †Iridistrophia
- †Irvingella
  - †Irvingella angustilimbatus
  - †Irvingella flohri
  - †Irvingella major
  - †Irvingella transversa
- †Isbergia
- †Ischyrophyma – tentative report
- †Ischyrotoma
  - †Ischyrotoma juabensis
  - †Ischyrotoma stubblefieldi
- †Isochilina
- †Isograptus
- †Isophragma – tentative report
- †Isorthis
- †Isoteloides
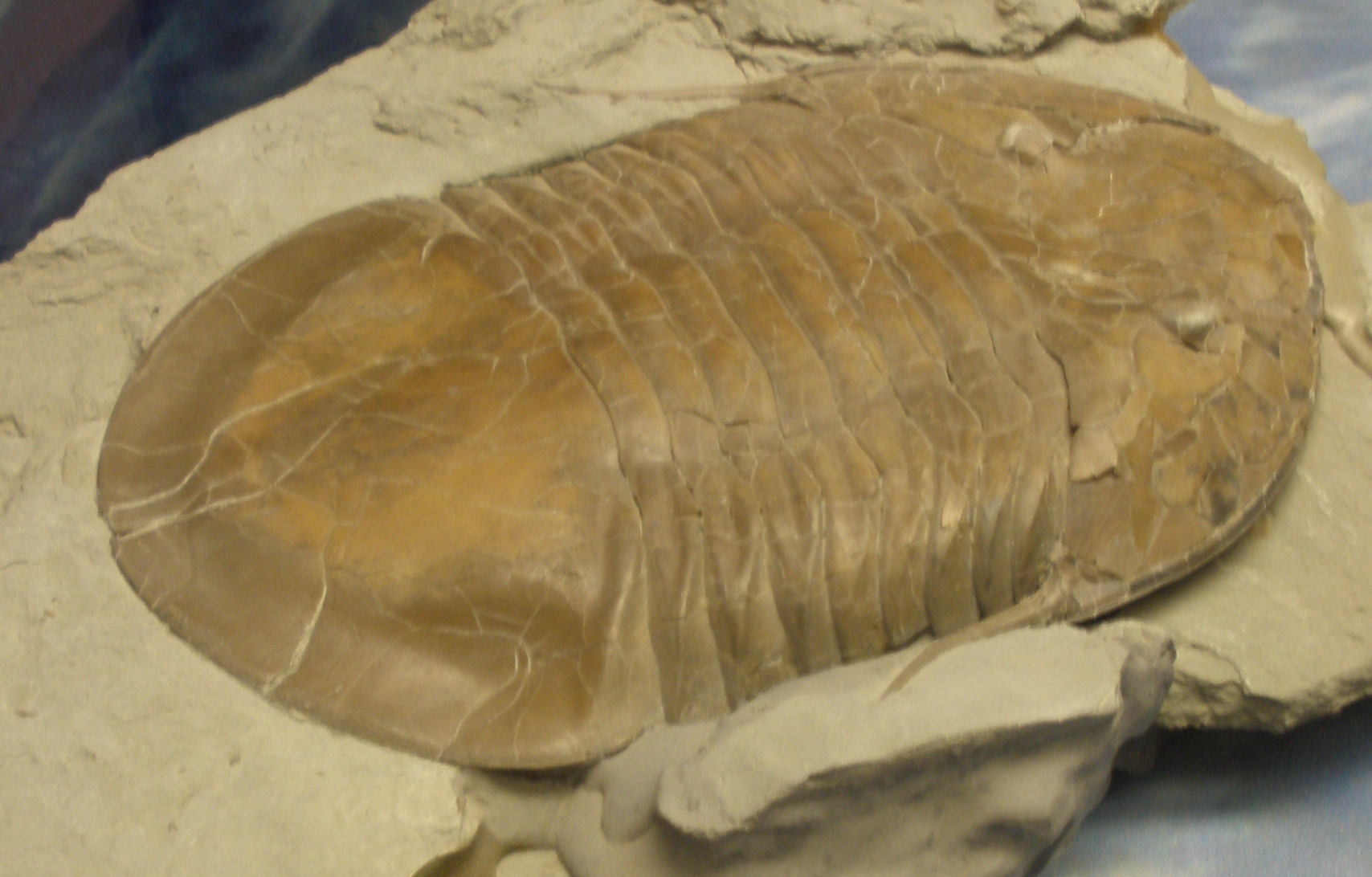
- Fossil of the Middle-Late Ordovician giant trilobite Isotelus.
  †Isotelus
  - †Isotelus copenhagenensis
  - †Isotelus spurius
- †Ivanovia

== J ==
- †Jedria
- †Jeffersonia
- †Jefina
- †Johnsonetes – report made of unidentified related form or using admittedly obsolete nomenclature
  - †Johnsonetes filistriata
- †Juresania
  - †Juresania ovalis – or unidentified comparable form
  - †Juresania rectangularis – or unidentified comparable form

== K ==
- †Kainella
  - †Kainella flagricauda
- †Kalimnasphaera
  - †Kalimnasphaera maculosa – or unidentified related form
- †Kallimorphocrinus
  - †Kallimorphocrinus eaglei
- †Kanoshia
  - †Kanoshia reticulata
- †Kaskia
- †Katuniella – tentative report
- †Kawina
  - †Kawina wilsoni – type locality for species
- †Kazakhoceras
  - †Kazakhoceras bylundi
- †Keriocyathus – type locality for genus
  - †Keriocyathus arachnaius – type locality for species
- †Kindbladia
  - †Kindbladia affinis
- †Kingopora
  - †Kingopora ehrenbergi – or unidentified comparable form
  - †Kingopora inflata – type locality for species
  - †Kingopora wardlawiensa – type locality for species
- †Kistocare
  - †Kistocare campbellensis – type locality for species
- †Kitikamispira
  - †Kitikamispira minuitinodosa
- †Kleopatrina
  - †Kleopatrina arcturusensis – type locality for species
  - †Kleopatrina ftatateeta
  - †Kleopatrina grandis
  - †Kleopatrina magnifica
  - †Kleopatrina simplex
- †Kloedenellitina – tentative report
- †Knightina
- †Knoxiella – tentative report
- †Kochaspis
  - †Kochaspis augusta
  - †Kochaspis liliana
- †Kochiella
  - †Kochiella augusta
  - †Kochiella brevaspis
  - †Kochiella maxeyi
- †Kochiellina
  - †Kochiellina groomensis
  - †Kochiellina janglensis
- †Kochina
  - †Kochina walcotti – type locality for species
- †Kochiproductus
- †Komaspidella
  - †Komaspidella occidentalis – type locality for species
- †Kometia – tentative report
- †Komia
  - †Komia eganensis
- †Komiella
  - †Komiella magnasulca
- †Koneprusia
- †Konickophyllum
- †Koninckophyllum
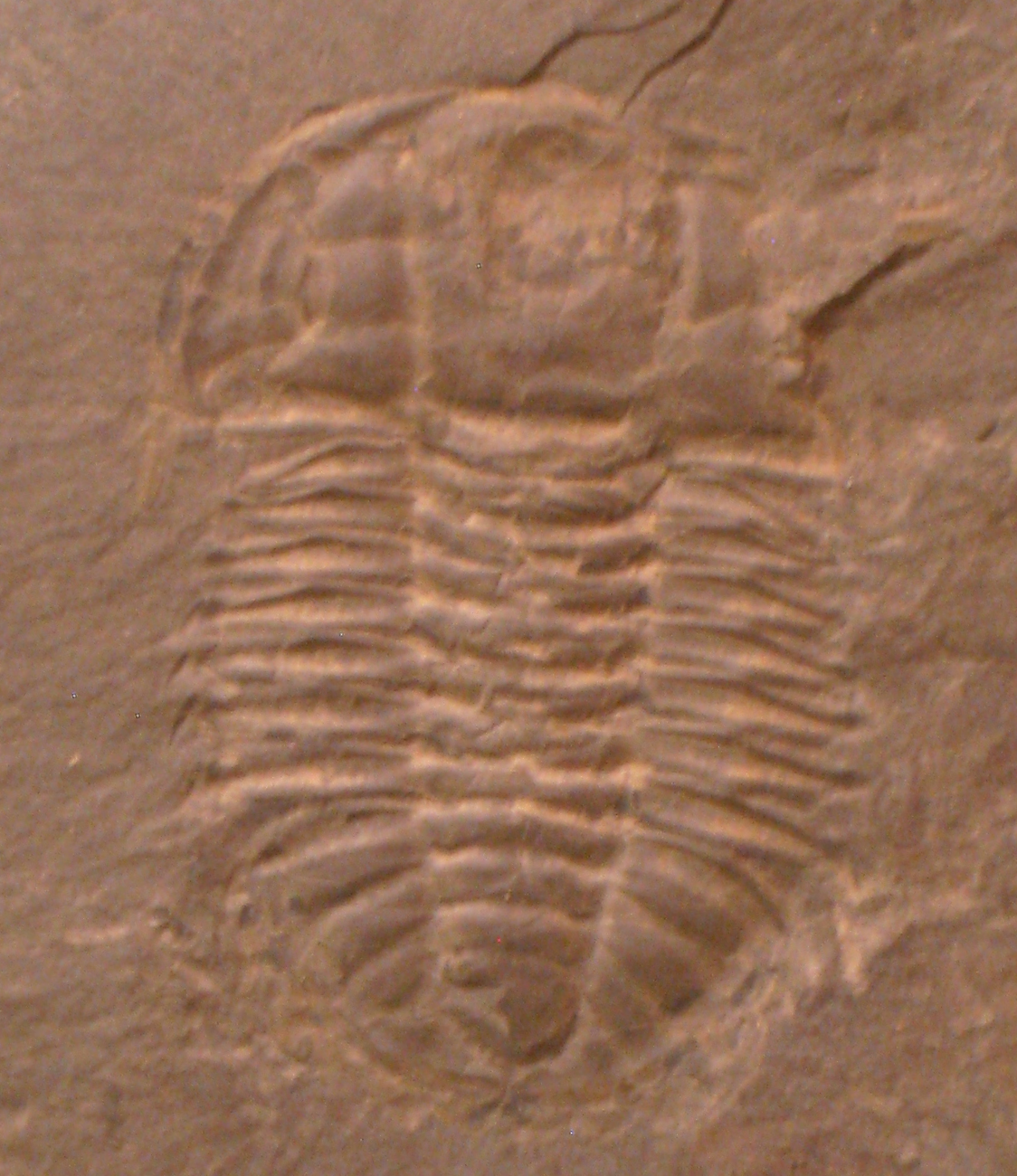
- Fossil of the Cambrian trilobite Kootenia
  †Kootenia
  - †Kootenia acicularis
  - †Kootenia aculacauda – type locality for species
  - †Kootenia brevispina
  - †Kootenia convoluta
  - †Kootenia crassa
  - †Kootenia crassinucha – type locality for species
  - †Kootenia dawsoni
  - †Kootenia germana
- †Kormagnostella
  - †Kormagnostella advena
- †Kozlowskia
  - †Kozlowskia haydenensis
  - †Kozlowskia kingi
  - †Kozlowskia splendens
- †Kozlowskiellina
- †Kozlowwkiella
  - †Kozlowwkiella lazarei
- †Krausella
- †Krotovia
  - †Krotovia globosa – or unidentified related form
  - †Krotovia knighti
- †Kutorginella
  - †Kutorginella lasallensis
  - †Kutorginella pseudantiquatonia – type locality for species
- †Kuvelousia
  - †Kuvelousia leptosa
- †Kyrshabaktella

== L ==
- †Labiostria
  - †Labiostria westropi
- †Lachnostoma
  - †Lachnostoma latucelsum
- †Ladatheca
  - †Ladatheca cylindrica
- †Ladjia
  - †Ladjia cordillera – type locality for species
  - †Ladjia russelli
  - †Ladjia saltica – or unidentified comparable form
- †Ladogioides
  - †Ladogioides pax – or unidentified comparable form
- †Laeogyra – or unidentified comparable form
- †Lamellospira
- †Landercyathus – type locality for genus
  - †Landercyathus lewandowskii – type locality for species
- †Laticrura
  - †Laticrura heteropleura – or unidentified comparable form
- †Latiendothyra
- †Laurentoscandodus
  - †Laurentoscandodus triangularis
- †Lebobienvillia
- †Leeites
  - †Leeites leei – type locality for species
- †Lehua
  - †Lehua argus – or unidentified related form
- †Leiorhynchus
  - †Leiorhynchus carboniferum
  - †Leiorhynchus hippocastanea
  - †Leiorhynchus miriam
  - †Leiorhynchus nevadensis – or unidentified comparable form
  - †Leiorhynchus rhabdotum – or unidentified comparable form
- †Leiostegium
  - †Leiostegium goodwinensis
- †Leiostrototropis – tentative report
- †Lensotreta – type locality for genus
  - †Lensotreta perplexa – type locality for species
- †Leonardoceras
  - †Leonardoceras parvum
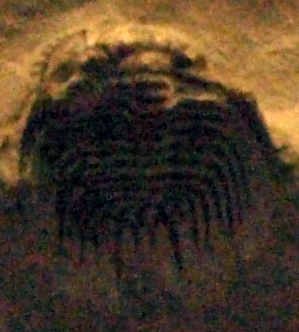
- Fossil of the Late Ordovician-Middle Devonian trilobite Leonaspis
  †Leonaspis
- †Leperditella
  - †Leperditella incisa – or unidentified comparable form
  - †Leperditella tumida – or unidentified comparable form
  - †Leperditella valida
- †Lepetopsis
  - †Lepetopsis franae – type locality for species
- †Lepidocyclus
- †Lepidoleptaena
- †Leptaena
  - †Leptaena acuticuspidata – or unidentified comparable form
  - †Leptaena ordovicica – or unidentified comparable form
- †Leptaenisca
- †Leptathyris
  - †Leptathyris circula
  - †Leptathyris index
  - †Leptathyris obsolescens
- †Leptella
  - †Leptella austrina – type locality for species
  - †Leptella nevadensis
- †Leptellina
  - †Leptellina occidentalis
- †Leptobolus – tentative report
- †Leptocoelia
  - †Leptocoelia murphyi – type locality for species
- †Leptocoelina
  - †Leptocoelina squamosa – type locality for species
- †Leptodesma
- †Leptomphalus
  - †Leptomphalus arcturus – type locality for species
- †Leptostrophia
  - †Leptostrophia beckii – or unidentified comparable form
  - †Leptostrophia inequicostella
- †Lesueurilla
- †Leurosina
  - †Leurosina sinesulca
- †Levenea
  - †Levenea fagerholmi – type locality for species
  - †Levenea navicula – type locality for species
- †Lichenaria
- †Licnocephala
  - †Licnocephala cavigladius
- †Lidaconus – type locality for genus
  - †Lidaconus palmettoensis – type locality for species
- †Limipecten
- †Lingula
  - †Lingula carbonaria – or unidentified comparable form
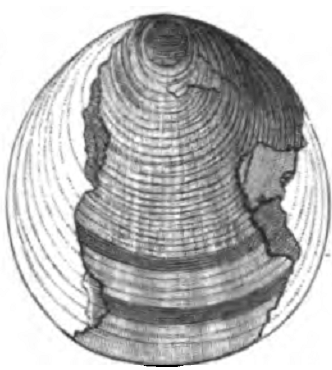
- Illustration of a fossilized shell of the Cambrian-Late Ordovician brachiopod Lingulella
  †Lingulella
- †Linipalus
  - †Linipalus magnispinus – or unidentified related form
- †Linnarssonella
- †Linnarssonia
- †Linoproductus
  - †Linoproductus ovata
  - †Linoproductus planiventralis
  - †Linoproductus prattenianus
  - †Linoproductus prottenianus
- †Liocheina
- †Liricamera
  - †Liricamera nevadensis
- †Lissatrypa – tentative report
- †Lissochonetes
- †Lissocoelia
  - †Lissocoelia cylindrica – type locality for species
  - †Lissocoelia ramosa
- †Listroa
  - †Listroa toxoura
- †Lithostrotionella
  - †Lithostrotionella castelnaui
- †Litocephalus
  - †Litocephalus bilobatus
  - †Litocephalus granulomarginatus
  - †Litocephalus magnus
  - †Litocephalus verruculapeza
- †Lobocorallium
  - †Lobocorallium trilobatum
- †Lobosiphon
- †Lodanaria – report made of unidentified related form or using admittedly obsolete nomenclature
  - †Lodanaria floryi
- †Loganograptus
- †Lomatopisthia – tentative report
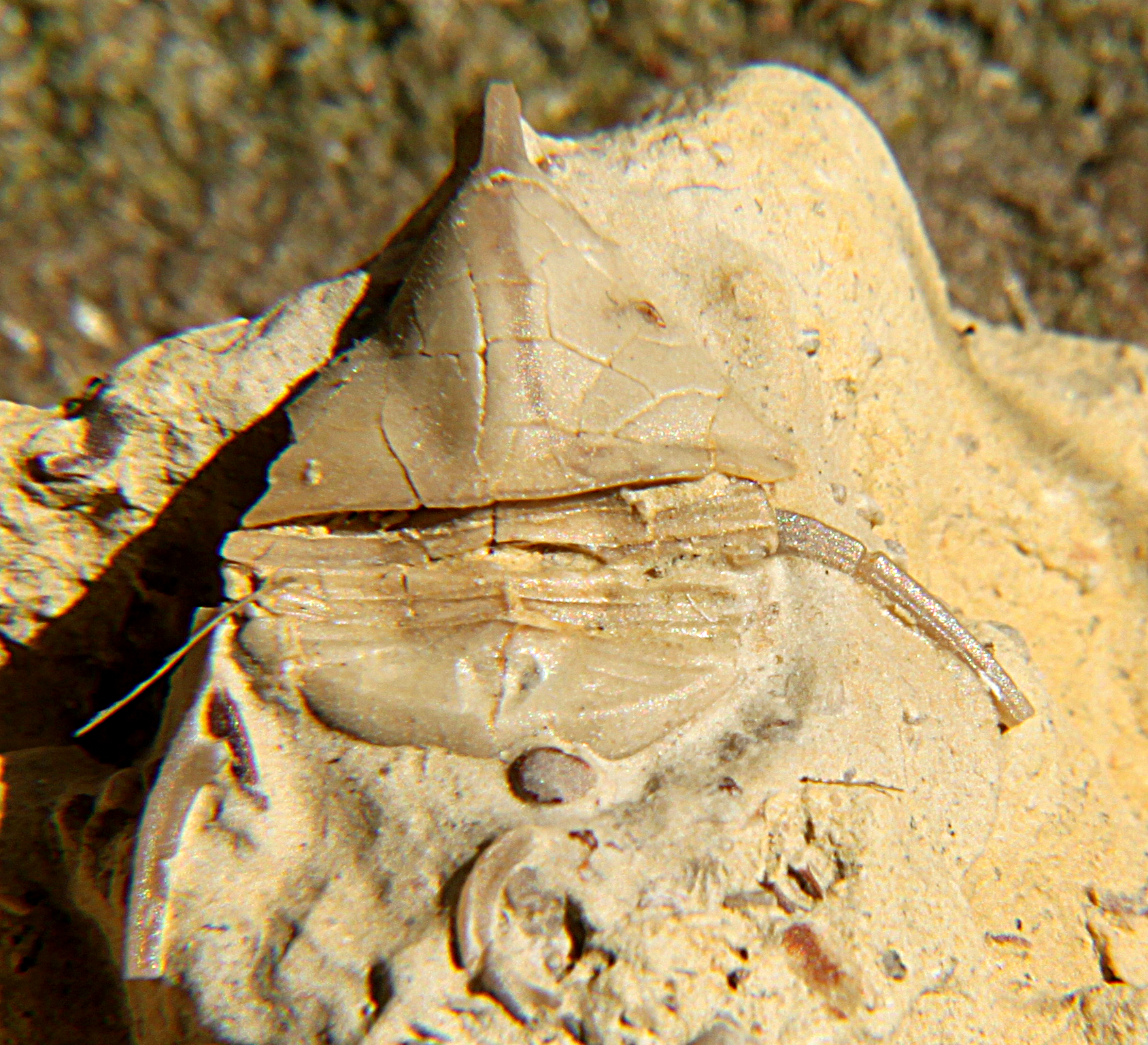
- Fossil of the Ordovician trilobite Lonchodomas
  †Lonchodomas
- †Lophonema
  - †Lophonema frydai
- †Lophophyllum – tentative report
- †Lophospira
  - †Lophospira perangulata
- †Lotagnostus
  - †Lotagnostus trisectus – or unidentified comparable form
- †Loxonema
  - †Loxonema walcotti – type locality for species
- †Lunulazona
- †Lutulentus
  - †Lutulentus muralspineus
- †Lyrielasma
- †Lytvophyllum – tentative report

== M ==
- †Macannaia
  - †Macannaia maladensis
- †Macgeea
- †Machaeraria
- †Mackenziecyathus
  - †Mackenziecyathus bukryi
- †Macluritella – tentative report
  - †Macluritella gyroceras – or unidentified comparable form
- †Maclurites
  - †Maclurites magnus
- †Macrocyproides
- †Madaraspis
  - †Madaraspis magnifica
- †Malayaspira
  - †Malayaspira annulata
  - †Malayaspira hintzei
- †Mametella
- †Manzanella
- †Marginia
  - †Marginia ivanovae – or unidentified comparable form
- †Marginovatia
  - †Marginovatia catinulus
  - †Marginovatia eurekensis
- †Martinia
- †Martiniopsis – tentative report
- †Mauryella
- †Mccloudius
  - †Mccloudius parvus – type locality for species
- †Mclearnites
  - †Mclearnites invasor
- †Meekella
  - †Meekella attenuata
  - †Meekella striatocostata
- †Meekopinna
  - †Meekopinna sagitta
- †Meekopora
- †Meekospira
- †Megakozlowskiella
  - †Megakozlowskiella magnapleura – type locality for species
  - †Megakozlowskiella raricosta – or unidentified comparable form
- †Megalaspidella – tentative report
- †Megalaspides
- †Megastrophia
  - †Megastrophia iddingsi
  - †Megastrophia transitans
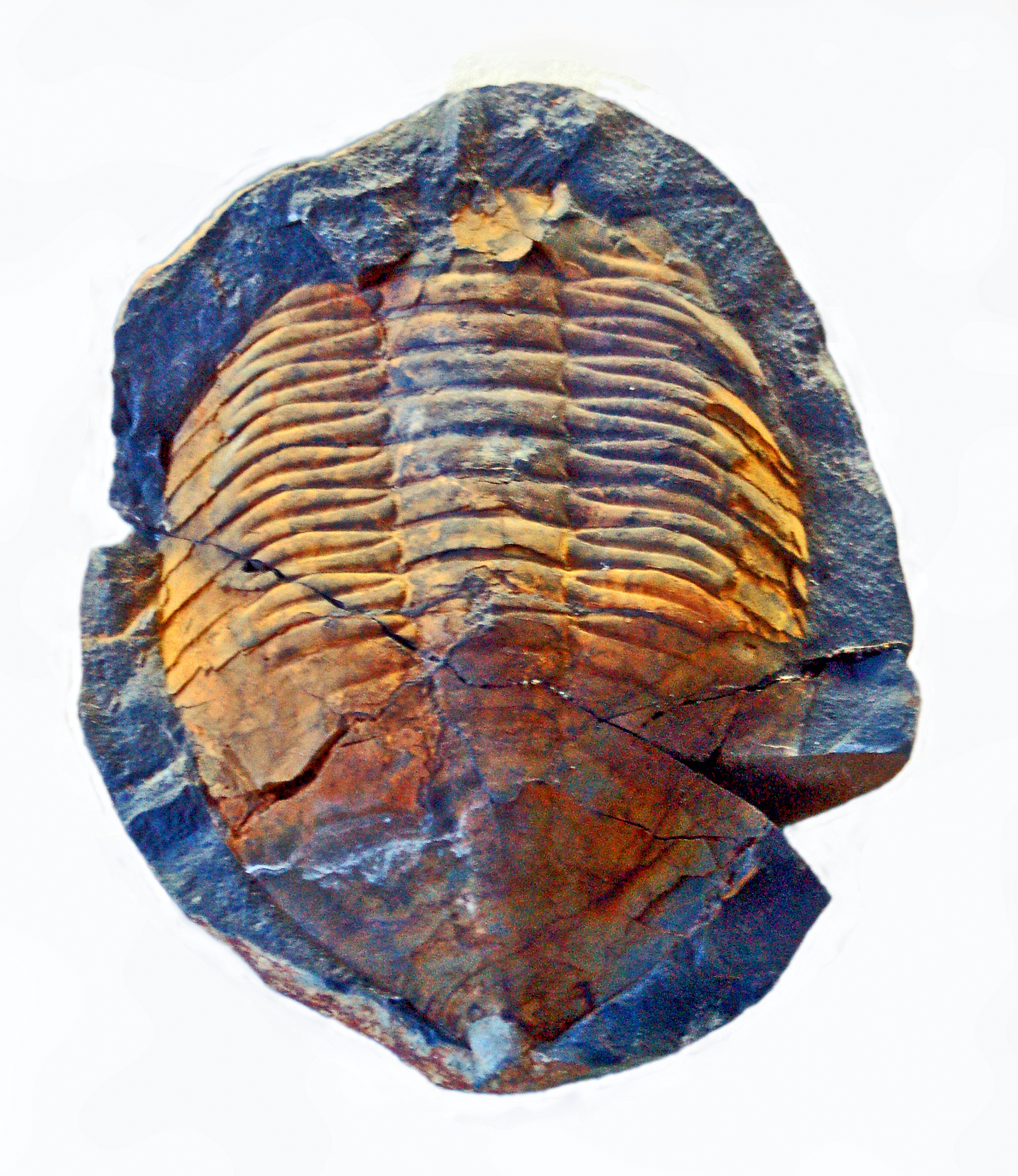
- Fossil of the Cambrian-Silurian trilobite Megistaspis
  †Megistaspis
- †Meristella
  - †Meristella robertsensis
- †Meristina
- †Merriamites
  - †Merriamites eurekae
- †Mesodouvillina
  - †Mesodouvillina varistriata – or unidentified comparable form
- †Mesolobus
- †Mesopholidostrophia – tentative report
- †Mesoschubertella
  - †Mesoschubertella mullerriedi
- †Mesotrypa
- †Metabolograptus
  - †Metabolograptus persculptus
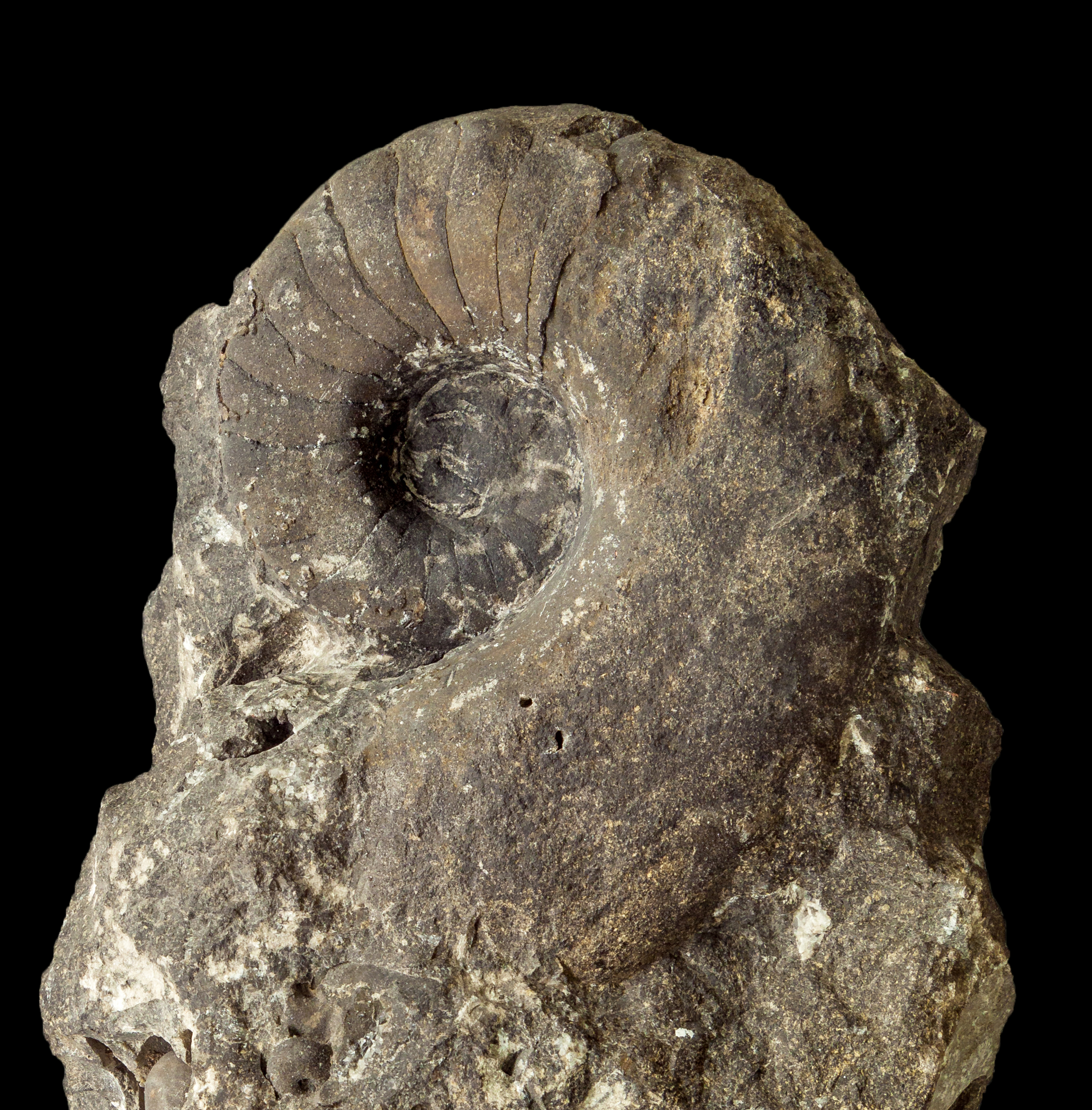
- Fossilized shell of the Carboniferous-Permian nautiloid cephalopod Metacoceras
  †Metacoceras
- †Metadimorphoceras
  - †Metadimorphoceras richardsi – type locality for species
- †Metaldetes
- †Metaplasia
  - †Metaplasia paucicostata – or unidentified comparable form
- †Metrionaxon
- †Mexicaspis
  - †Mexicaspis difuntosensis
- †Mexicella
  - †Mexicella antelopea
  - †Mexicella grandoculus – tentative report
  - †Mexicella granulata – type locality for species
  - †Mexicella mexicana
  - †Mexicella robusta
  - †Mexicella stator
- †Michelinia
  - †Michelinia meekana
- †Michelinoceras
  - †Michelinoceras wilsoni
- †Microcardinalia
- †Microcheinella
  - †Microcheinella peculiaris – or unidentified comparable form
- †Microdoma
- †Micromitra
- †Microplasma
- †Microryctocara
  - †Microryctocara nevadensis
- †Milleratia – tentative report
- †Millerella
  - †Millerella marblensis
- †Mimatrypa
- †Mimospira
  - †Mimospira helmhackeri – or unidentified related form
- †Minervaecystis – tentative report
- †Minupeltis
  - †Minupeltis conservator
- †Minycardita – type locality for genus
  - †Minycardita sectilis – type locality for species
- †Missisquoia
- †Mizzia
  - †Mizzia yabei – or unidentified comparable form
- †Moapacrinus
  - †Moapacrinus inornatus
  - †Moapacrinus rotundatus

†Modiolus

  - †Modiolus nevadensis
- †Modiomorpha – tentative report
  - †Modiomorpha pintoensis
- †Molybdocyathus – type locality for genus
  - †Molybdocyathus juvenilis – type locality for species
- †Monocraterion
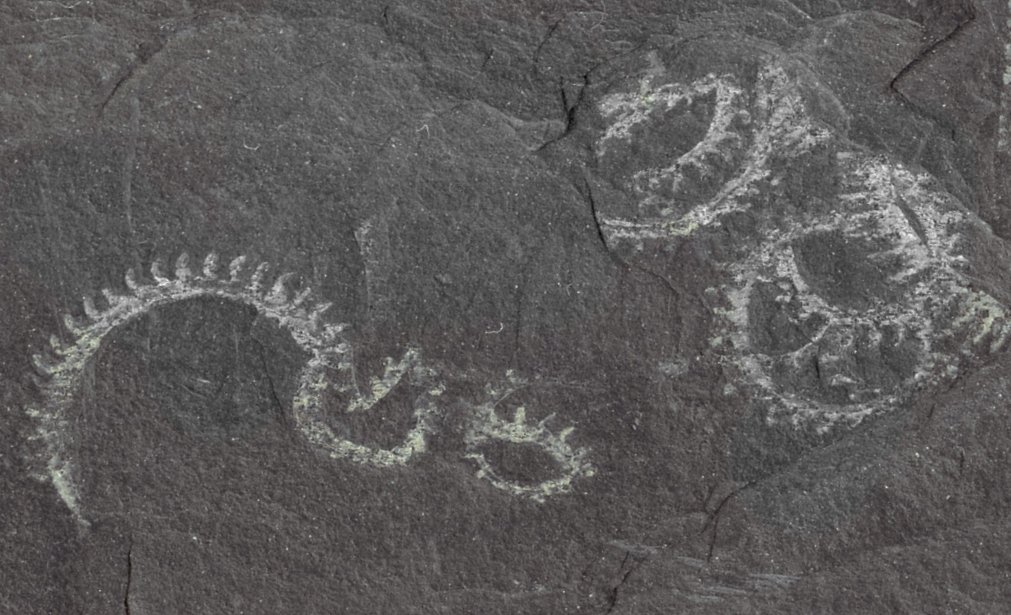
- Fossils of the Early Devonian graptolite Monograptus
  †Monograptus
  - †Monograptus angustidens
  - †Monograptus birchensis
  - †Monograptus hercynicus
  - †Monograptus thomasi
  - †Monograptus uniformis
  - †Monograptus yukonensis
- †Mononusphaericorhynchus
  - †Mononusphaericorhynchus sartenaeri
- †Monotiopleura
- †Montezumaspis
  - †Montezumaspis cometes
  - †Montezumaspis parallela
- †Monticuliporella
- †Moorefieldella
  - †Moorefieldella eurekensis
- †Mooreoceras
- †Morinorhynchus
- †Morosa
  - †Morosa brevispina
  - †Morosa definita
  - †Morosa extensa
  - †Morosa longispina
- †Morozoviella – type locality for genus
  - †Morozoviella curriensis – type locality for species
  - †Morozoviella praecurriensis – type locality for species
- †Moscovicrinus
  - †Moscovicrinus bipinnatus
- †Mourlonia
  - †Mourlonia type locality for species A – informal
- †Mucophyllum
  - †Mucophyllum oliveri
- †Multicostella
- †Multioistodus
- †Multithecopora
  - †Multithecopora hypatiae
- †Murchisonia
  - †Murchisonia megathanae – type locality for species
  - †Murchisonia tillesae – type locality for species
- †Mutationella – tentative report
- †Myalina
- †Mytilarca

== N ==
- †Nadiastrophia
- †Nanicella
- †Nanillaenus
- †Nankinella
- †Nanorthis
  - †Nanorthis hamburgensis
- †Nardophyllum
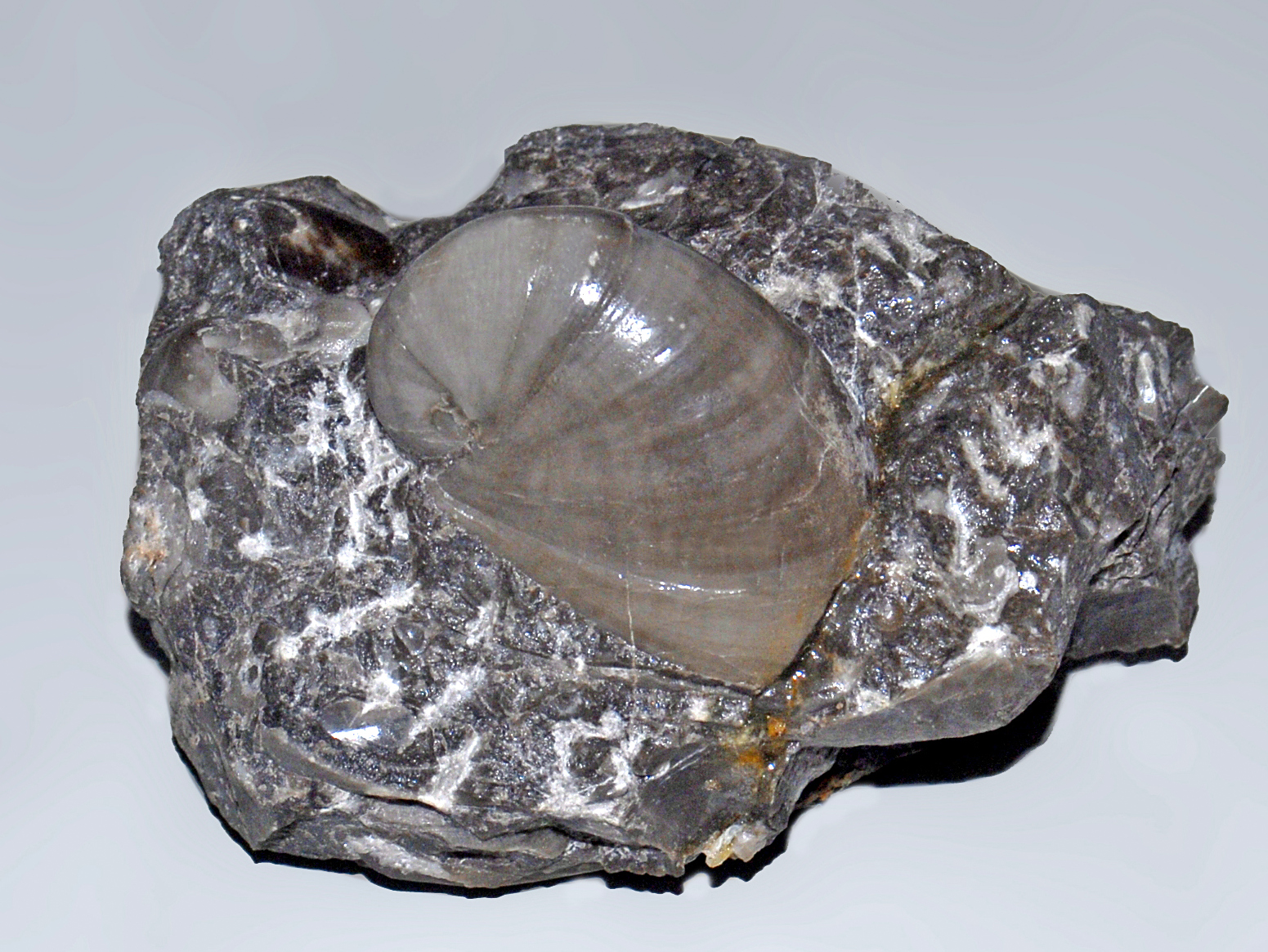
- Fossilized shell of the Early Devonian – Triassic sea snail Naticopsis
  †Naticopsis
  - †Naticopsis glomerosa – type locality for species
  - †Naticopsis inornata
  - †Naticopsis kaibabensis
- †Neaxon
- †Neilsonia
  - †Neilsonia welleri – or unidentified comparable form
- †Nemesa
  - †Nemesa cimex – type locality for species
- †Neoarchaediscus
- †Neochonetes
  - †Neochonetes acanthoporus
  - †Neochonetes dominus
  - †Neochonetes granulifer
- †Neoeridotrypella
  - †Neoeridotrypella schilti – type locality for species
- †Neomphyma
  - †Neomphyma karpinskiense
  - †Neomphyma nevadense
- †Neomultithecopora
  - †Neomultithecopora mccutcheonae – type locality for species
- †Neopanderodus
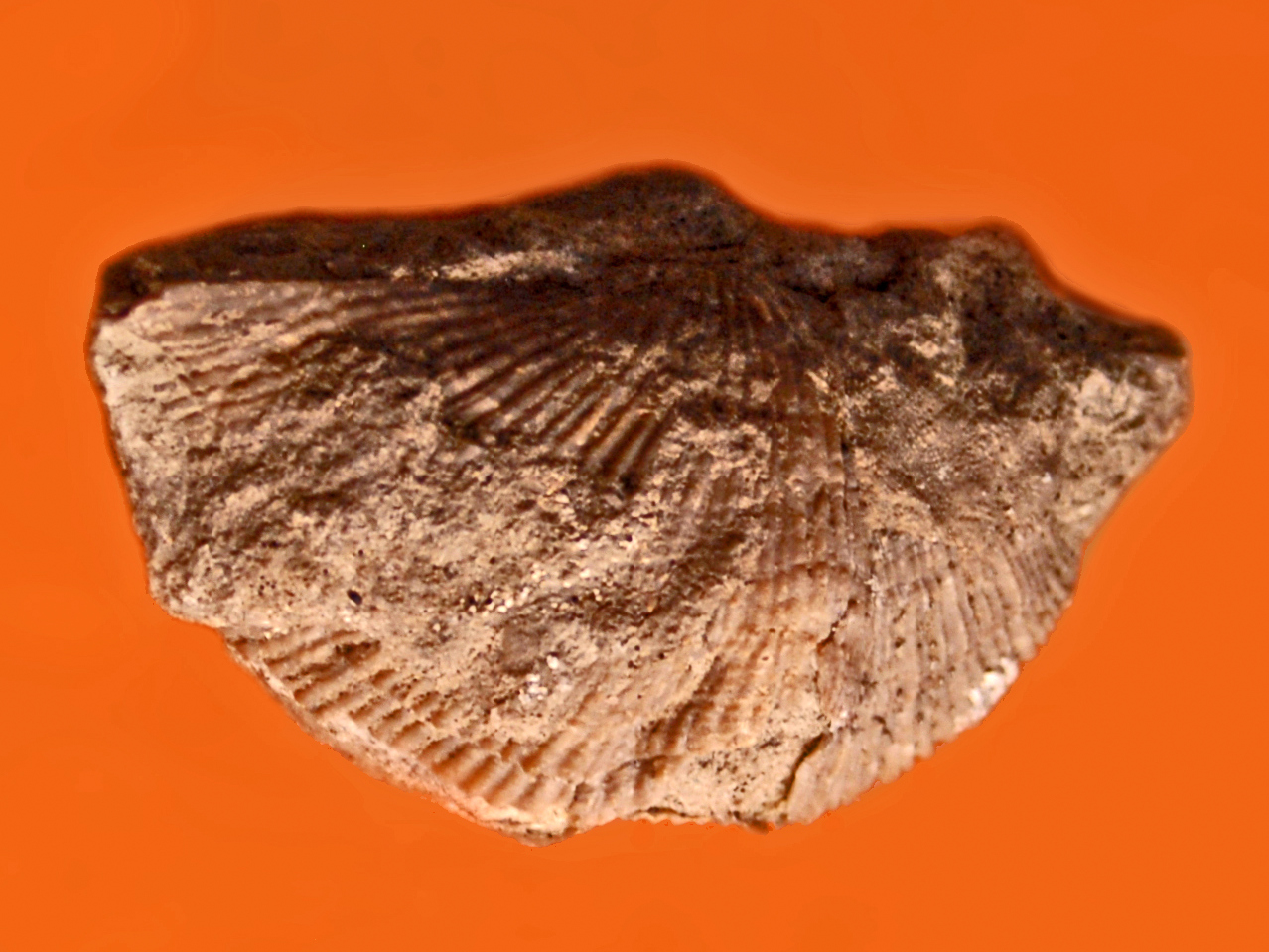
- Fossilized shell of the Carboniferous-Permian brachiopod Neospirifer
  †Neospirifer
  - †Neospirifer cameratus
  - †Neospirifer dunbari
  - †Neospirifer gorei
  - †Neospirifer goreii
  - †Neospirifer latus – or unidentified comparable form
  - †Neospirifer triplicatus
- †Neosyringopora
  - †Neosyringopora multattenuata
- †Neozeacrinus
  - †Neozeacrinus coronulus
  - †Neozeacrinus wanneri
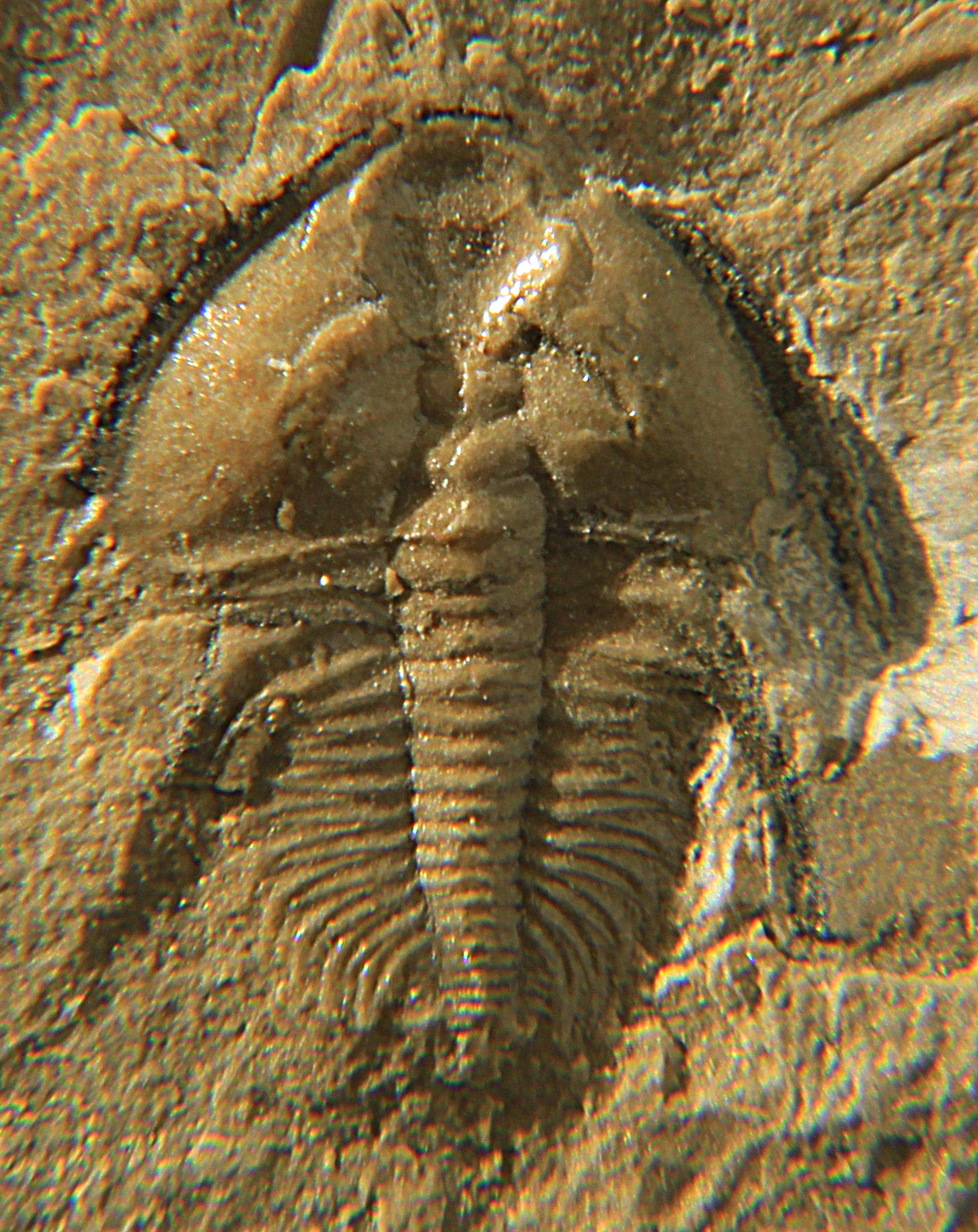
- Fossil of the Cambrian trilobite Nephrolenellus
  †Nephrolenellus
  - †Nephrolenellus geniculatus
  - †Nephrolenellus greniculatus – type locality for species
- †Nervostrophia
- †Nevadacrinus
  - †Nevadacrinus geniculatus
- †Nevadaspira – type locality for genus
  - †Nevadaspira cooperi – type locality for species
- †Nevadatubulus – type locality for genus
  - †Nevadatubulus dunfee – type locality for species
- †Nevadella
  - †Nevadella eucharis
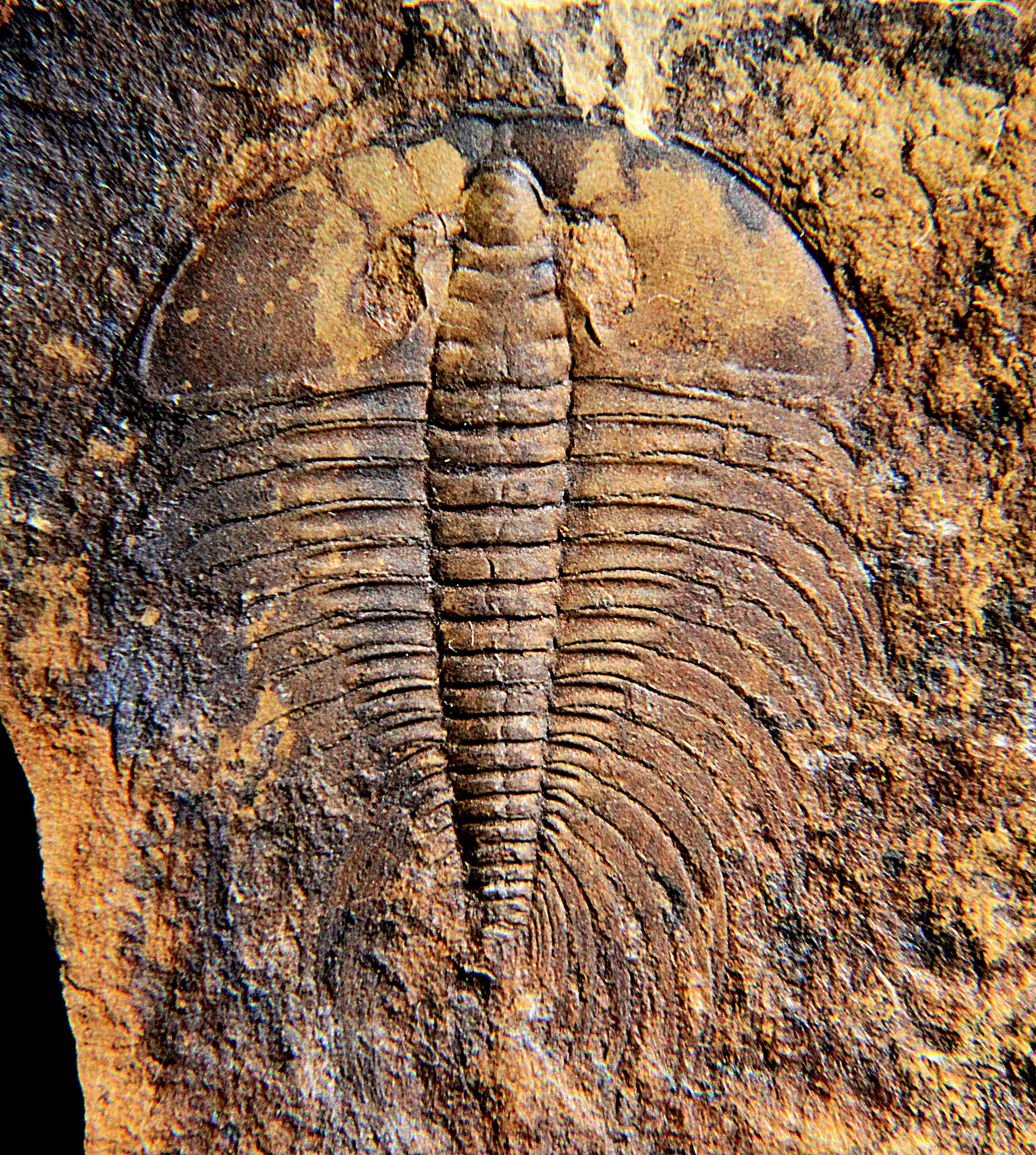
- Fossil of the Cambrian trilobite Nevadia
  †Nevadia
  - †Nevadia parvoconica
  - †Nevadia weeksi
- †Nevadoceras
  - †Nevadoceras steelei – type locality for species
- †Nevadocoelia
  - †Nevadocoelia grandis
  - †Nevadocoelia pulchrata
  - †Nevadocoelia traini
  - †Nevadocoelia wistae
- †Newberria
- †Nicholsonella – tentative report
- †Nicklesopora
  - †Nicklesopora avia
- †Nicolella – tentative report
- †Nicollidina
  - †Nicollidina brevis
- †Nielsonia – or unidentified related form
- †Nileus
  - †Nileus hesperaffinis
  - †Nileus scrutator – or unidentified related form
- †Niobe
  - †Niobe quadraticaudata – or unidentified comparable form
- †Niobella
- †Nisusia – tentative report
- †Noblella
  - †Noblella tremadociensis – type locality for species
- †Normalograptus
  - †Normalograptus ajjeri
  - †Normalograptus angustus
  - †Normalograptus elegantulus
  - †Normalograptus extraordinarius
  - †Normalograptus myrniensis
  - †Normalograptus ojsuensis
- †Nothorthis – tentative report
- †Notopeltis
  - †Notopeltis orthometopa
- †Nucleospira
  - †Nucleospira subsphaerica – type locality for species
- †Nuculavus
  - †Nuculavus levatiformis
- †Nuculoidea
- †Nuculopsis
  - †Nuculopsis darlingensis – or unidentified comparable form
  - †Nuculopsis girtyi
  - †Nuculopsis levatiformis
- †Nuia
- †Nyctopora
- †Nyella
  - †Nyella clinolimbata
  - †Nyella granosa
  - †Nyella immoderata
  - †Nyella plana
  - †Nyella rara

== O ==
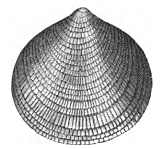
- Illustration of fossils of the Cambrian brachiopod Obolella
  †Obolella
- †Obolus
- †Odontospirifer
  - †Odontospirifer type locality for species A – informal
- †Oepikina
- †Ogygopsis
  - †Ogygopsis batis
  - †Ogygopsis typicalis
- †Oistodus
  - †Oistodus contractus
  - †Oistodus lanceolatus – or unidentified comparable form
- †Oklahomacrinus
  - †Oklahomacrinus triangulus
- †Olenaspella
  - †Olenaspella paucisegmenta
  - †Olenaspella regularis
  - †Olenaspella separata – type locality for species
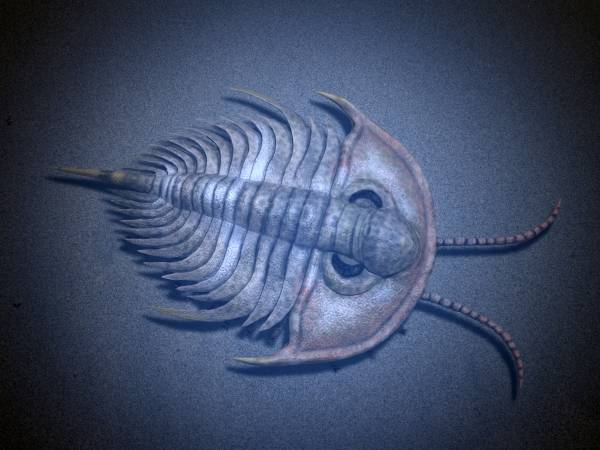
- Restoration of the Cambrian trilobite Olenellus
  †Olenellus
  - †Olenellus chiefensis – type locality for species
  - †Olenellus clarki
  - †Olenellus fowleri – type locality for species
  - †Olenellus fremonti – or unidentified comparable form
  - †Olenellus gilberti
  - †Olenellus howelli
  - †Olenellus multinodus
  - †Olenellus puertoblancoensis – tentative report
  - †Olenellus terminatus – type locality for species
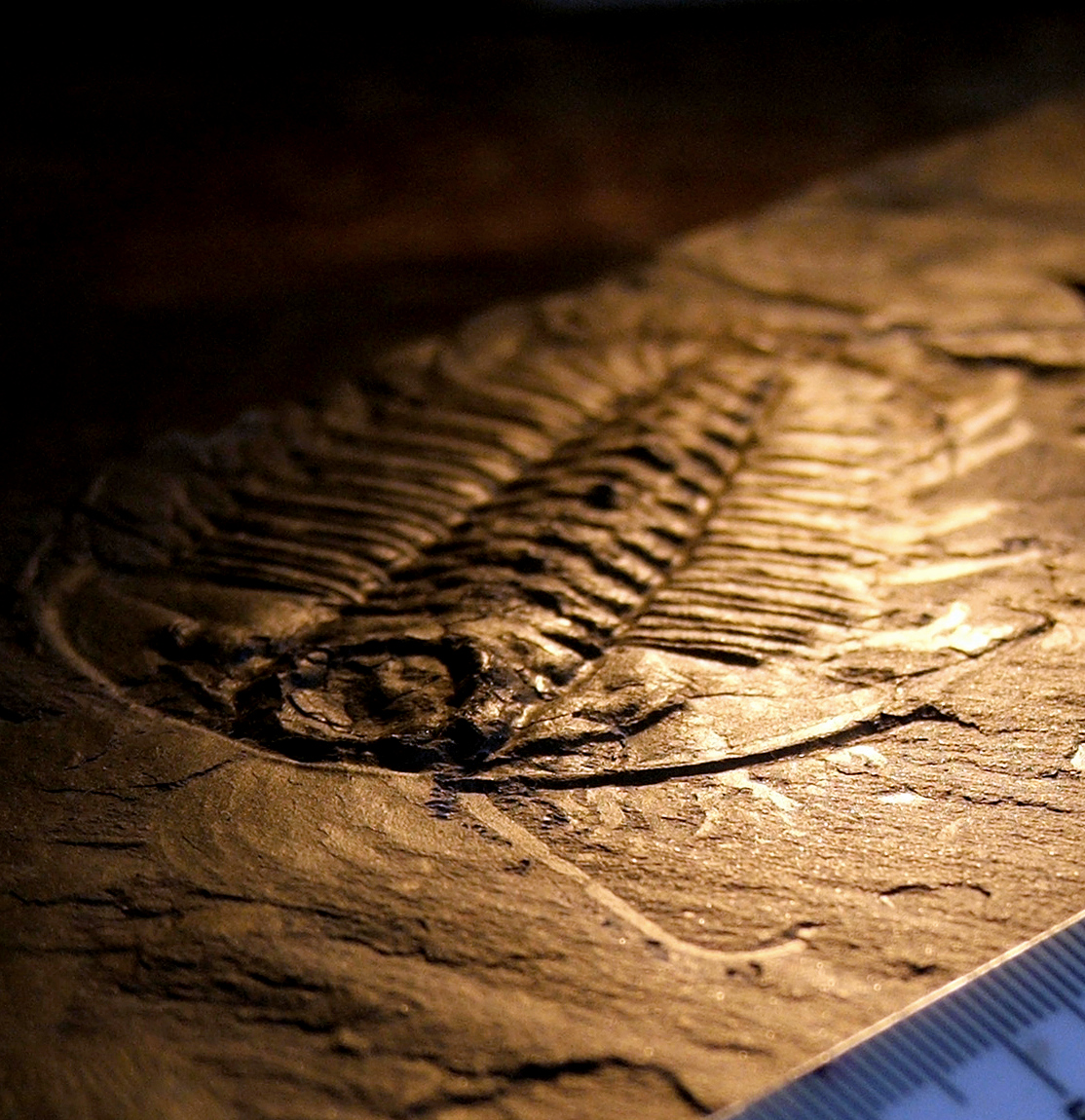
- Fossil preserving carbon films left by the legs and antennae of the Cambrian trilobite Olenoides
  †Olenoides
  - †Olenoides maladensis
  - †Olenoides steptoensis – type locality for species
- †Olenus
  - †Olenus wilsoni
- †Oligometopus
  - †Oligometopus contractus
- †Ollenellus
  - †Ollenellus gilberti
- †Omphalocirrus – tentative report
- †Omphalotrochus
- †Onchocephalites
  - †Onchocephalites claytonensis – type locality for species
- †Onchocephalus
  - †Onchocephalus maior – or unidentified comparable form
  - †Onchocephalus major – or unidentified comparable form
  - †Onchocephalus palupus – type locality for species
- †Oncochilus
- †Onuphlonella – tentative report
- †Onychoplecia – tentative report
- †Ophioxenikos
  - †Ophioxenikos langenheimi
- †Opikina
- †Opipeuter
- †Opisthotreta
  - †Opisthotreta indistincta – type locality for species
  - †Opisthotreta transversa – type locality for species
- †Opsiosoryctocephalus – type locality for genus
  - †Opsiosoryctocephalus ophis – type locality for species
- †Orbiculoidea
  - †Orbiculoidea capuliformis
  - †Orbiculoidea missouriensis
  - †Orbiculoidea moorefieldana – or unidentified related form
- †Orecopia
  - †Orecopia mccoyi
- †Oriostoma
  - †Oriostoma gerbaulti
- †Oriskania
- †Orthambonites
  - †Orthambonites bifurcatus
  - †Orthambonites decipiens – or unidentified comparable form
  - †Orthambonites dinorthoides
  - †Orthambonites eucharis
  - †Orthambonites mazourkaensis – or unidentified comparable form
  - †Orthambonites minisculus
  - †Orthambonites minusculus
  - †Orthambonites patulus
  - †Orthambonites paucicostatus
  - †Orthambonites subulata
- †Orthidiella
  - †Orthidiella carinata
  - †Orthidiella costellata
  - †Orthidiella extensa
  - †Orthidiella longwelli
- †Orthidium
  - †Orthidium bellulum
  - †Orthidium fimbriatum – or unidentified related form
- †Orthis
- †Orthoceras
- †Orthograptus
  - †Orthograptus calcaratus
  - †Orthograptus truncatus
- †Orthonema
- †Orthonychia
  - †Orthonychia occidens
- †Orthoretiolites
  - †Orthoretiolites hami
- †Orthostrophella
  - †Orthostrophella monitorensis – type locality for species
- †Orthostrophia
- †Orthotetes
  - †Orthotetes kaskaskiensis
  - †Orthotetes occidentalis
- †Orthotichia – tentative report
- †Orthovertella
- †Orulgania
- †Oryctocephalina
  - †Oryctocephalina maladensis – tentative report
- †Oryctocephalites
  - †Oryctocephalites claytonensis – type locality for species
  - †Oryctocephalites palmeri
  - †Oryctocephalites rasettii
  - †Oryctocephalites runcinatus
  - †Oryctocephalites typicalis
- †Oryctocephalus
  - †Oryctocephalus americanus – type locality for species
  - †Oryctocephalus indicus
  - †Oryctocephalus maladensis
  - †Oryctocephalus nyensis
  - †Oryctocephalus orientalis
  - †Oryctocephalus primus
- †Otarion
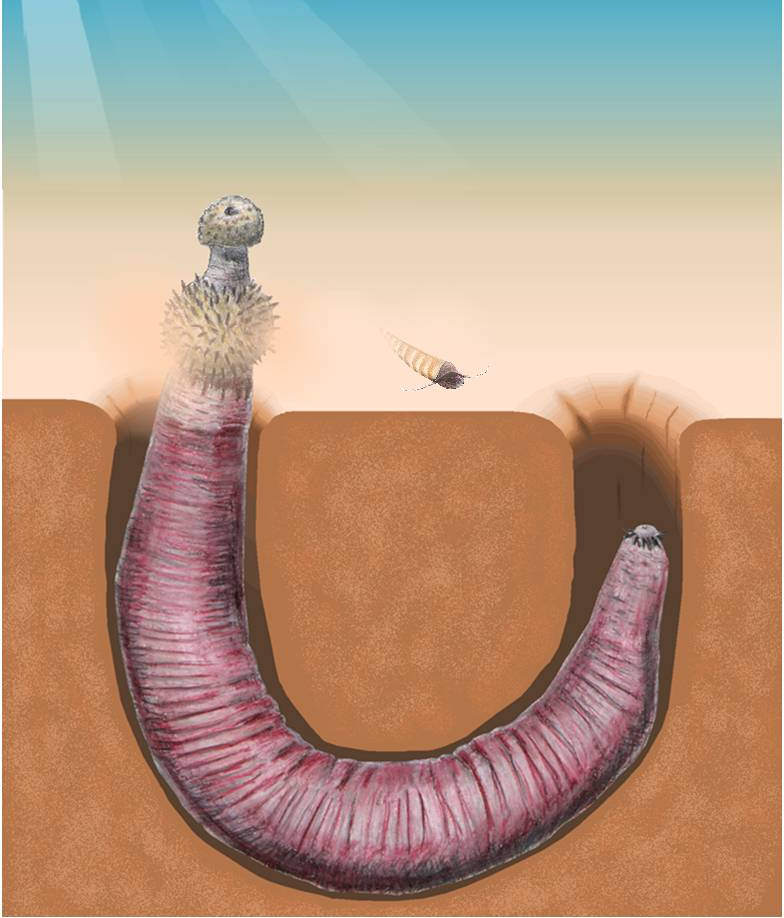
- Life restoration of the Cambrian priapulid worm relative Ottoia
  †Ottoia
- †Ottoseetaxis
- †Oulodus
  - †Oulodus rohneri
  - †Oulodus ulrichi
- †Ovatia
  - †Ovatia latior – or unidentified comparable form
  - †Ovatia nodosa
- †Ovatoryctocara – tentative report
- †Oxoplecia
  - †Oxoplecia monitorensis
  - †Oxoplecia nevadensis
- †Oxyspira – type locality for genus
  - †Oxyspira murphyi – type locality for species
- †Ozarkodina
  - †Ozarkodina hassi
  - †Ozarkodina oldhamensis – tentative report
  - †Ozarkodina raaschi
  - †Ozarkodina tenuis – or unidentified comparable form

== P ==
- †Pachyaspis
  - †Pachyaspis gallagari – type locality for species
  - †Pachyaspis longa – type locality for species
- †Pachyconulus
  - †Pachyconulus parvalus
- †Pachydictya
- †Pachyfavosites
- †Pachyphyllum
- †Pachystrophia
- †Pacificocoelia
  - †Pacificocoelia infrequens
- †Paeckelmanella
- †Paedeumias
  - †Paedeumias granulatus – type locality for species
  - †Paedeumias nevadensis – tentative report
- †Paenebeltella
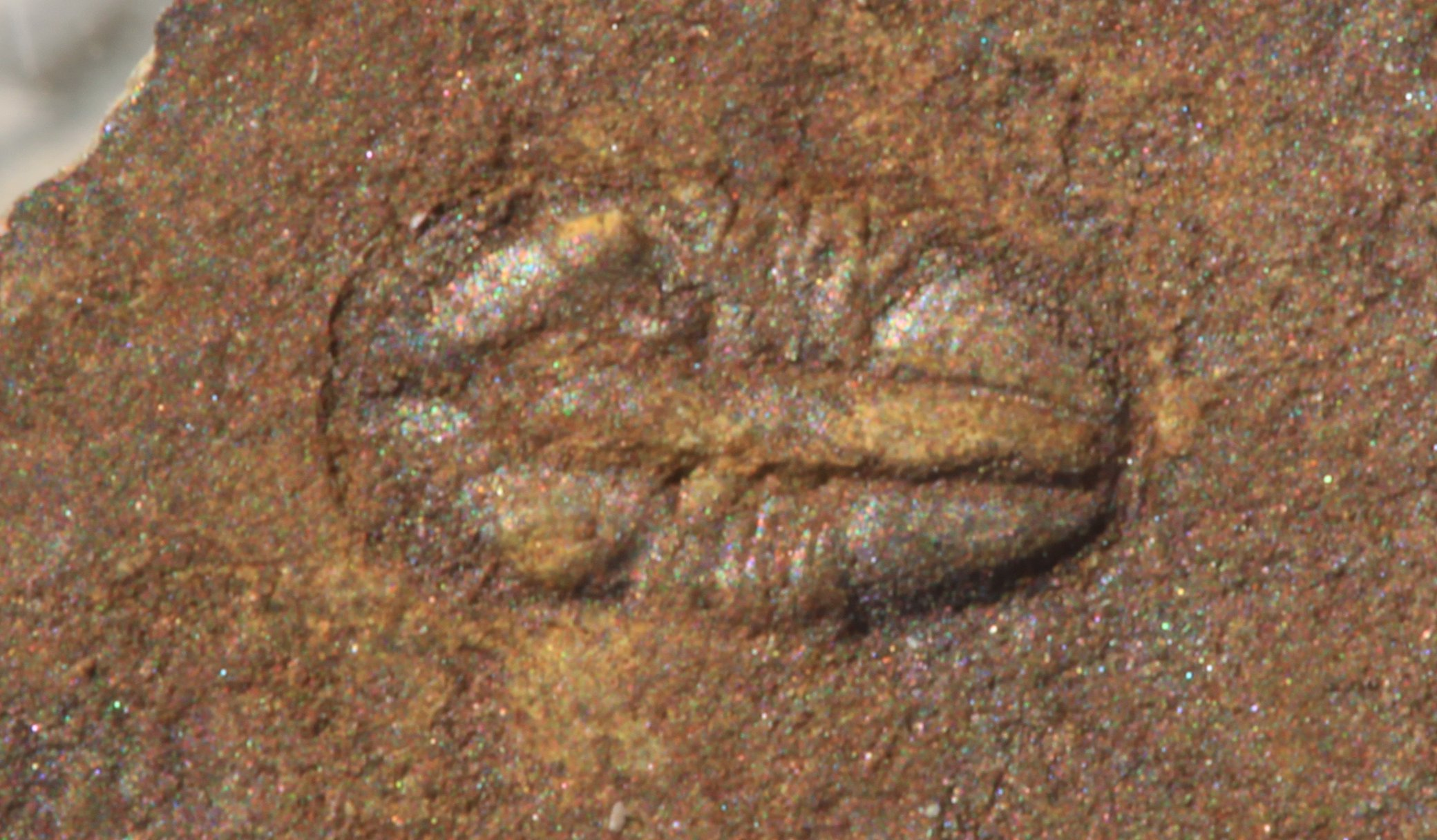
- Fossil of the Cambrian trilobite Pagetia
  †Pagetia
  - †Pagetia arenosa
  - †Pagetia clytia
  - †Pagetia maladensis
  - †Pagetia mucrogena
  - †Pagetia prolata
  - †Pagetia resseri
  - †Pagetia rugosa
- †Paladin
- †Palaeocapulus
  - †Palaeocapulus piso
- †Palaeocyclus
  - †Palaeocyclus eurylophus
- †Palaeoneilo
  - †Palaeoneilo mcchesneyana
- †Palaeophippium
  - †Palaeophippium octaramosum – type locality for species
- †Palaeophyllum
- †Palaeosphaera – type locality for genus
  - †Palaeosphaera micra – type locality for species
- †Palaeostylus
- †Palaeotextularia
  - †Palaeotextularia consobrina – or unidentified loosely related form
- †Palaeotrifidus – type locality for genus
  - †Palaeotrifidus ballator – type locality for species
  - †Palaeotrifidus imbifurcus – type locality for species
- †Palaeotripus
  - †Palaeotripus sexabrachiatus – type locality for species
- †Paleofavosites
- †Paleoneilo
- †Palliseria – type locality for genus
  - †Palliseria longwelli – type locality for species
  - †Palliseria robusta
- †Palmettaspis – type locality for genus
  - †Palmettaspis consorta – type locality for species
  - †Palmettaspis lidensis
  - †Palmettaspis parallela – type locality for species
- †Paltodus
- †Pamchonetes
  - †Pamchonetes macrostriatus
- †Panacus – type locality for genus
  - †Panacus palmeri – type locality for species
- †Pancus – type locality for genus
  - †Pancus palmeri – type locality for species
- †Panderodus
  - †Panderodus feulneri
  - †Panderodus unicostatus
- †Pandorinellian
  - †Pandorinellian linguiformis
- †Pandorinellina
  - †Pandorinellina angustinpennatus – or unidentified comparable form
  - †Pandorinellina angustipennatus – or unidentified comparable form
  - †Pandorinellina exigua
  - †Pandorinellina expansa
  - †Pandorinellina linguiformis
  - †Pandorinellina steinhornensis
- †Papiliophyllum
  - †Papiliophyllum murphyi
  - †Papiliophyllum vescum
- †Paraantagmus
  - †Paraantagmus latus
- †Parabellefontia
  - †Parabellefontia concinna – or unidentified comparable form
- †Parabolablastus
  - †Parabolablastus elongatus – type locality for species
- †Parabolinella
  - †Parabolinella hecuba
  - †Parabolinella tumifrons – or unidentified comparable form
- †Paracaligelloides
- †Parachaetes
- †Parachonetes
  - †Parachonetes macrostriatus
- †Paraconularia
- †Paracrothyris
- †Paracyclas
- †Parafafallotaspis
- †Parafallotaspis
- †Parafusulina
- †Paragloborilus
- †Paraheritschioides
  - †Paraheritschioides californiense
  - †Paraheritschioides fergusonensis – type locality for species
  - †Paraheritschioides grandis
  - †Paraheritschioides nevadaensis – type locality for species
  - †Paraheritschioides stevensi
- †Parahousia
  - †Parahousia constricta
  - †Parahousia subequalis
- †Parahystricurus
- †Parajuresania
  - †Parajuresania nebrascensis
- †Paralbertella
  - †Paralbertella bosworthi
  - †Paralbertella bosworthy
- †Paralenorthis
  - †Paralenorthis marshalli
- †Parallelodon
  - †Parallelodon truncatus – or unidentified related form
- †Paramillerella
  - †Paramillerella inflecta
  - †Paramillerella pressa
- †Paranacyathus
- †Paranevadella
- †Paraorthograptus
  - †Paraorthograptus pacificus
  - †Paraorthograptus uniformis
- †Paraparchites
  - †Paraparchites cyclopeus – or unidentified related form
  - †Paraparchites nickelsi – or unidentified comparable form
- †Paraperrinites
  - †Paraperrinites subcumminsi – type locality for species
- †Parapholidostrophia – type locality for genus
  - †Parapholidostrophia harperi – type locality for species
- †Paraplegmatograptus
  - †Paraplegmatograptus uniformis
- †Paraporcellia
  - †Paraporcellia rohri
- †Parapoulsenia
  - †Parapoulsenia lata – or unidentified comparable form
- †Parapugnax
  - †Parapugnax bactrianense – type locality for species
- †Pararachnastraea
  - †Pararachnastraea illipahensis – type locality for species
  - †Pararachnastraea moormanensis – type locality for species
- †Parareteograptus
  - †Parareteograptus parvus
  - †Parareteograptus sinensis
  - †Parareteograptus turgidus
- †Pararhizophyllum – type locality for genus
  - †Pararhizophyllum parvulum – type locality for species
- †Paraschmidtella – tentative report
- †Parastringocephalus
- †Parastrophina – tentative report
- †Parathuramina
- †Paratikhinella
- †Parechidnina
  - †Parechidnina nevadensis – type locality for species
- †Parenthatia
- †Parethelocrinus
  - †Parethelocrinus rectilatus
- †Pareuloma
- †Parkaspis
  - †Parkaspis drumensis
- †Parkula
  - †Parkula esmeraldina – type locality for species
- †Paroistodus – tentative report
- †Patellispongia
  - †Patellispongia brosiusae – type locality for species
  - †Patellispongia oculata
- †Paterina
- †Paterula
- †Paterulus
- †Patriaspirifer
  - †Patriaspirifer kobehana
- †Paucicostella – tentative report
- †Paucicrura
  - †Paucicrura cristifera
  - †Paucicrura subplana – or unidentified comparable form
- †Paucispinifera – tentative report
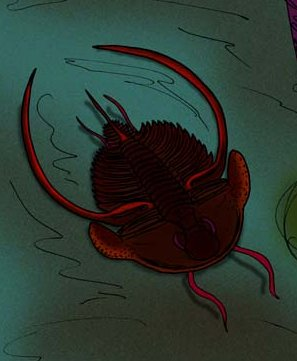
- Life restoration of the Cambrian trilobite Peachella
  †Peachella
  - †Peachella iddingsi
- †Peelerophon – tentative report
- †Pegmarhynchia
- †Pelagiella
- †Pelekygnathus
  - †Pelekygnathus linguiformis
  - †Pelekygnathus parawebbi
  - †Pelekygnathus pseudofoliatus
  - †Pelekygnathus xylus
- †Pelekysgnathus
  - †Pelekysgnathus angustipennatus
  - †Pelekysgnathus eiflius
  - †Pelekysgnathus intermedius
  - †Pelekysgnathus linguiformis
  - †Pelekysgnathus parawebbi
  - †Pelekysgnathus pseudofoliatus
  - †Pelekysgnathus robusticostatus
  - †Pelekysgnathus trigonicus
- †Peltabellia – tentative report
- †Peniculauris
  - †Peniculauris ivesi
- †Penniretepora
  - †Penniretepora oppositus
  - †Penniretepora trilineata
- †Pentamerella
  - †Pentamerella davidsoni – or unidentified comparable form
  - †Pentamerella wintereri
- †Pentamerifera
- †Pentameroides
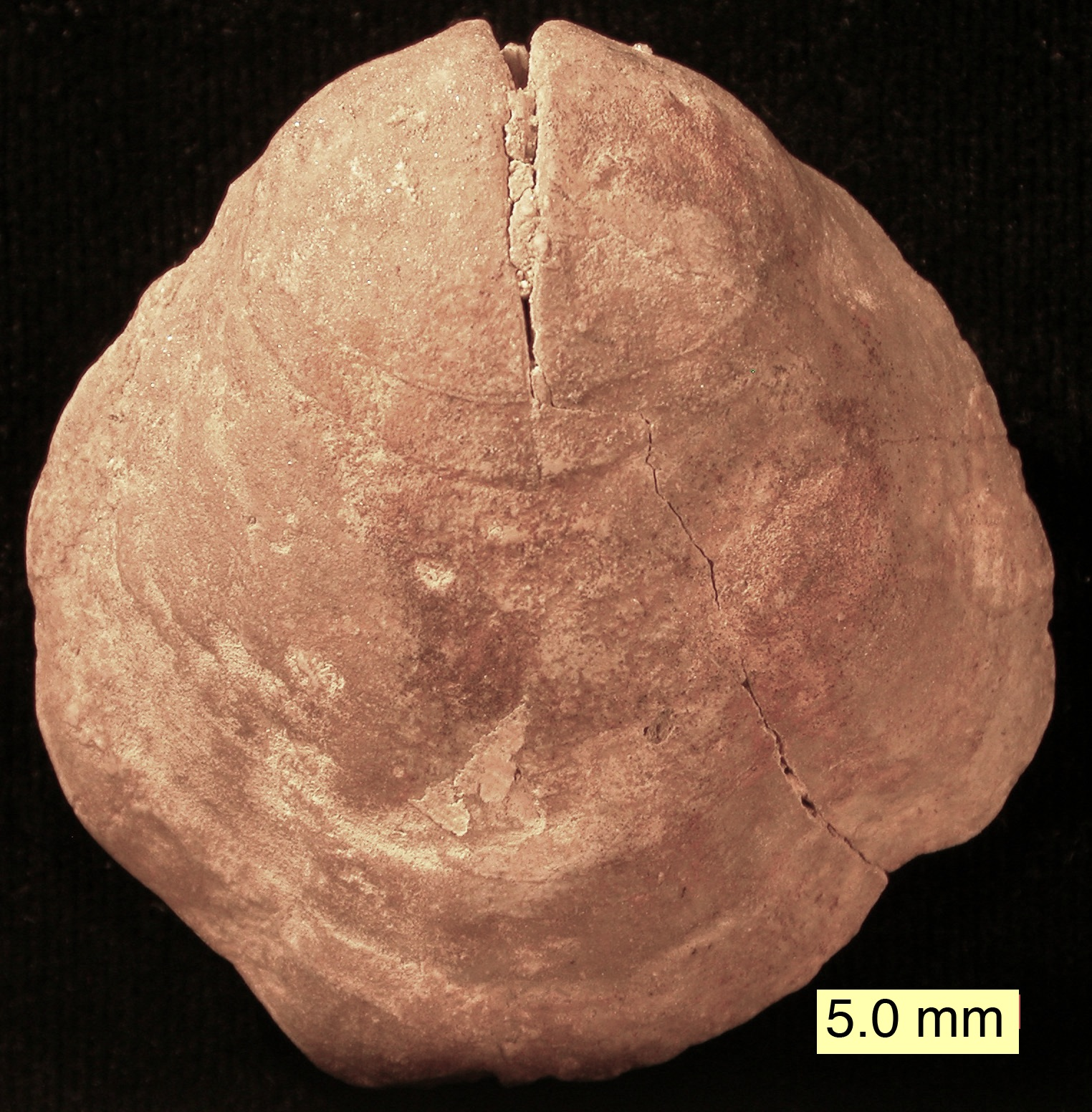
- Fossilized shell of the Silurian-Middle Devonian brachiopod Pentamerus
  †Pentamerus
- †Pentaxocrinus
  - †Pentaxocrinus quinarius
- †Pentlandella
- †Pentlandia
  - †Pentlandia merriami – type locality for species
- †Pentremites
- †Peraspis
  - †Peraspis erugata
- †Pericyclus
  - †Pericyclus antelopensis – type locality for species
  - †Pericyclus filaris
- †Perimestocrinus
  - †Perimestocrinus nevadensis
  - †Perimestocrinus oasis
- †Periodon
  - †Periodon aculeatus – tentative report
- †Perischoclonus
- †Perissopliomera
  - †Perissopliomera maclachlani
- †Perissopyge
  - †Perissopyge triangulata
- †Permastraea
  - †Permastraea biseptata – type locality for species
  - †Permastraea buttensis – type locality for species
  - †Permastraea campophylloides
  - †Permastraea nevadensis – type locality for species
- †Permocalculus
- †Permophorus
- †Pernopecten
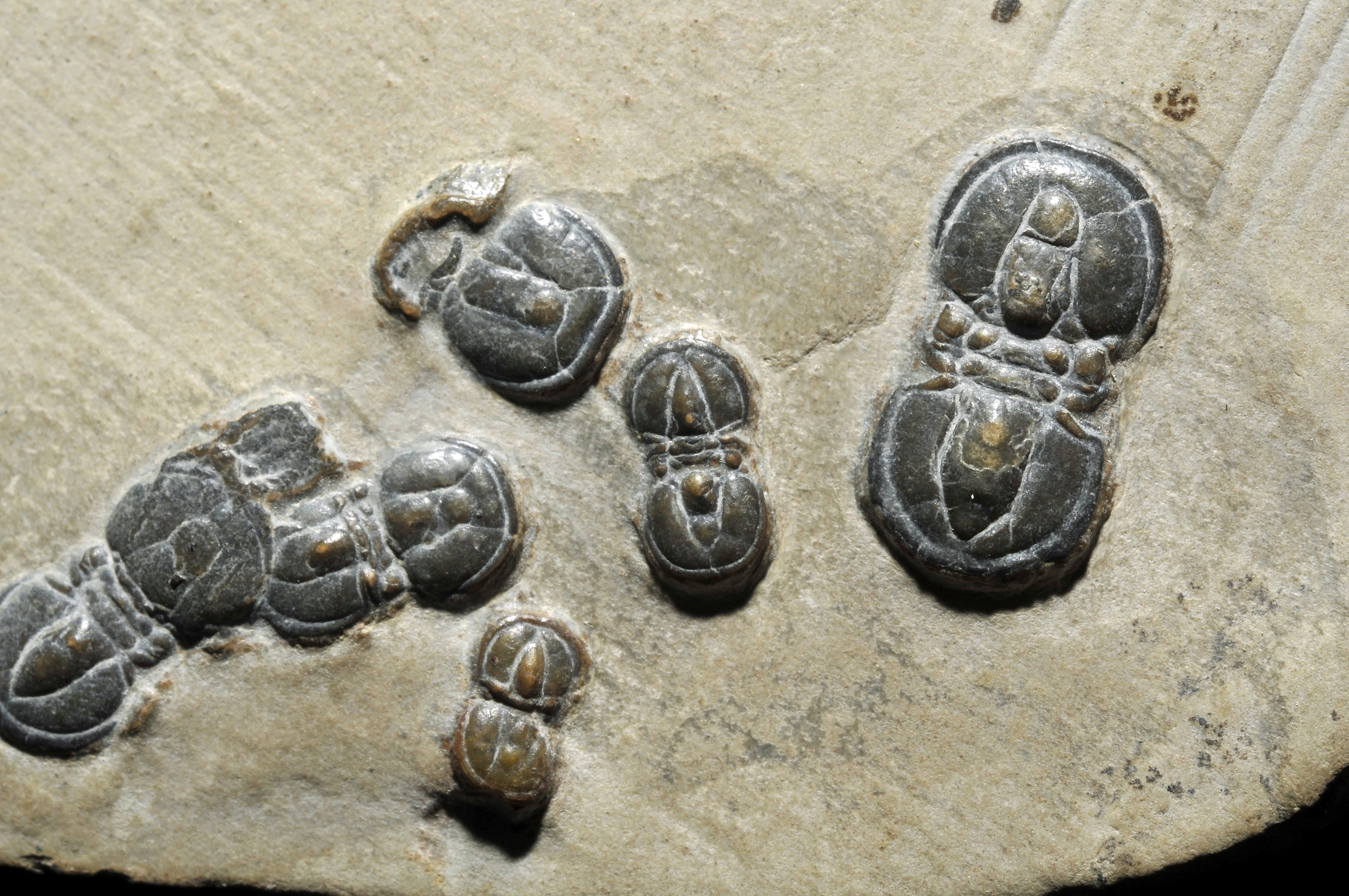
- Assemblage of fossils of the Cambrian trilobite Itagnostus interstrictus, until recently known as Peronopsis interstricta
  †Peronopsis
  - †Peronopsis amplaxis
  - †Peronopsis bonnerensis
  - †Peronopsis brighamensis
  - †Peronopsis fallax
  - †Peronopsis segmenta
- †Perspicaris
- †Peruvispira
  - †Peruvispira boreala – type locality for species
- †Petalaxis
  - †Petalaxis elyensis – type locality for species
  - †Petalaxis exiguus
  - †Petalaxis mokomokensis – type locality for species
  - †Petalaxis occidentalis
- †Petalocystites
- †Petasmatherus
  - †Petasmatherus type locality for species A – informal
- †Petigurus
  - †Petigurus inexpectatus
- †Petrochus
- †Petschoracrinus – tentative report
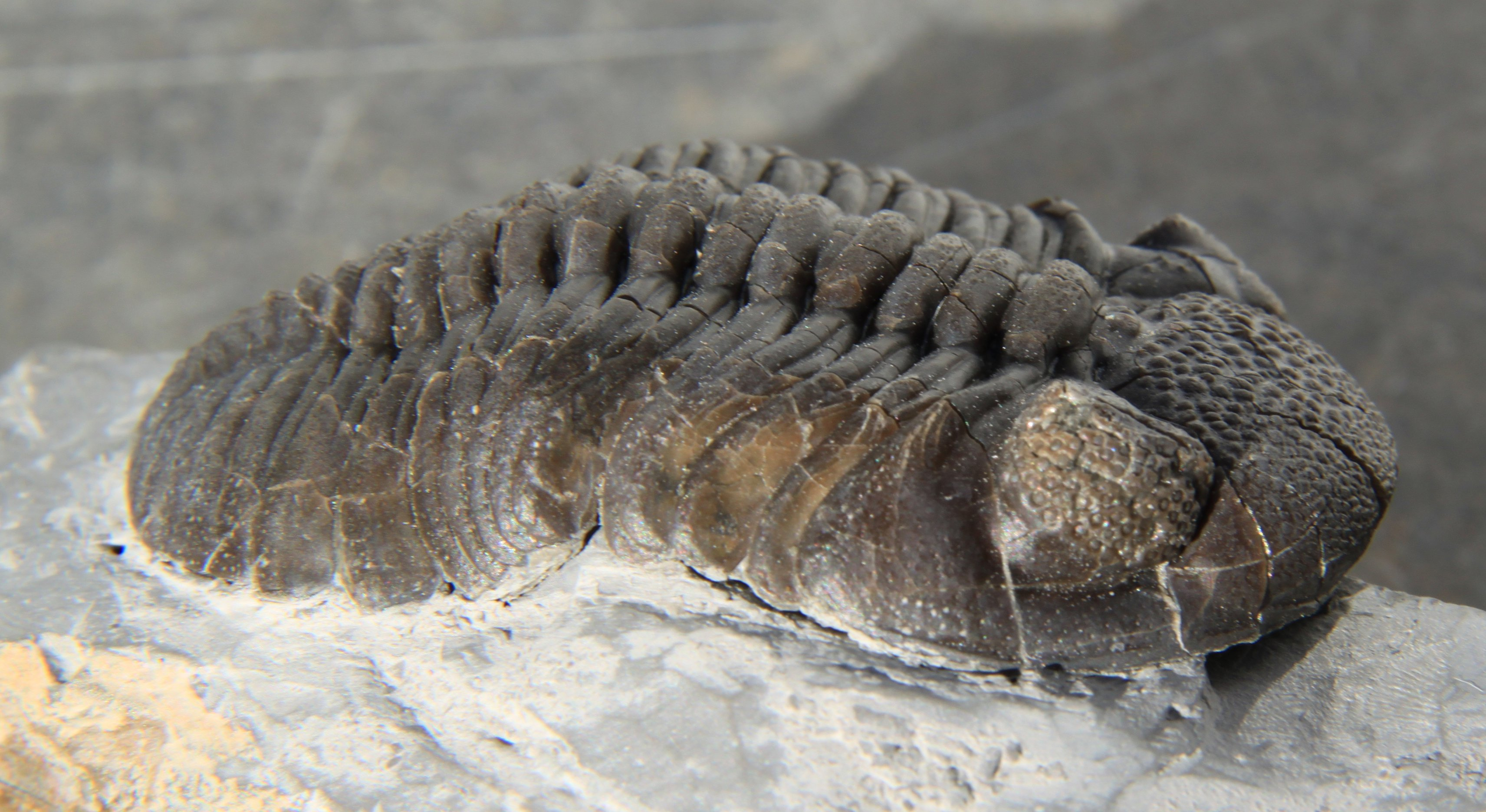
- Fossil of the Late Ordovician-Late Devonian trilobite Phacops
  †Phacops
- †Phalacroma
- †Phanocrinus – tentative report
  - †Phanocrinus insolitus
- †Phenacocyclas
- †Phestia
  - †Phestia perumbonata
- †Phillipsia
  - †Phillipsia peroccidens
- †Pholidostrophia
- †Phormograptus
  - †Phormograptus conectus
  - †Phormograptus connectus
- †Phragmodus
  - †Phragmodus undatus
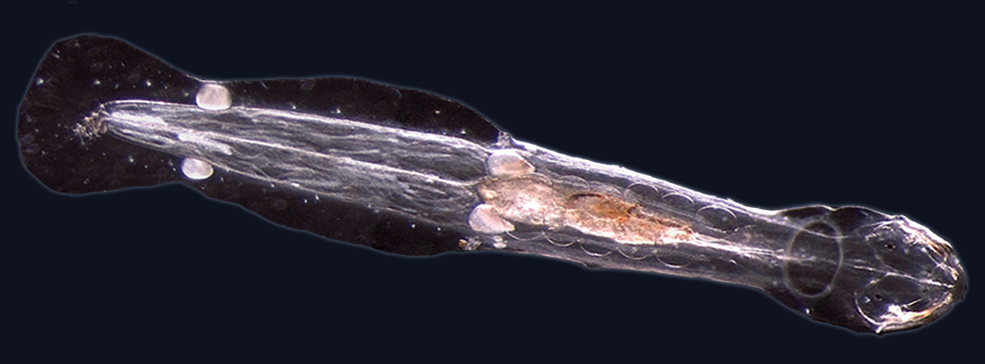
- Spadella cephaloptera
  †Phragmophora
- †Phragmorthis
  - †Phragmorthis antiqua – type locality for species
- †Phragmostrophia
  - †Phragmostrophia merriami – type locality for species
- †Phrenophoria
  - †Phrenophoria type locality for species A – informal
  - †Phrenophoria type locality for species B – informal
- †Phricodothyris
- †Phricodythyris
  - †Phricodythyris perplexa
- †Phrycodothyris
  - †Phrycodothyris perplexa
- †Phyllocystis
- †Phyllodictya
  - †Phyllodictya crystallaria – or unidentified comparable form
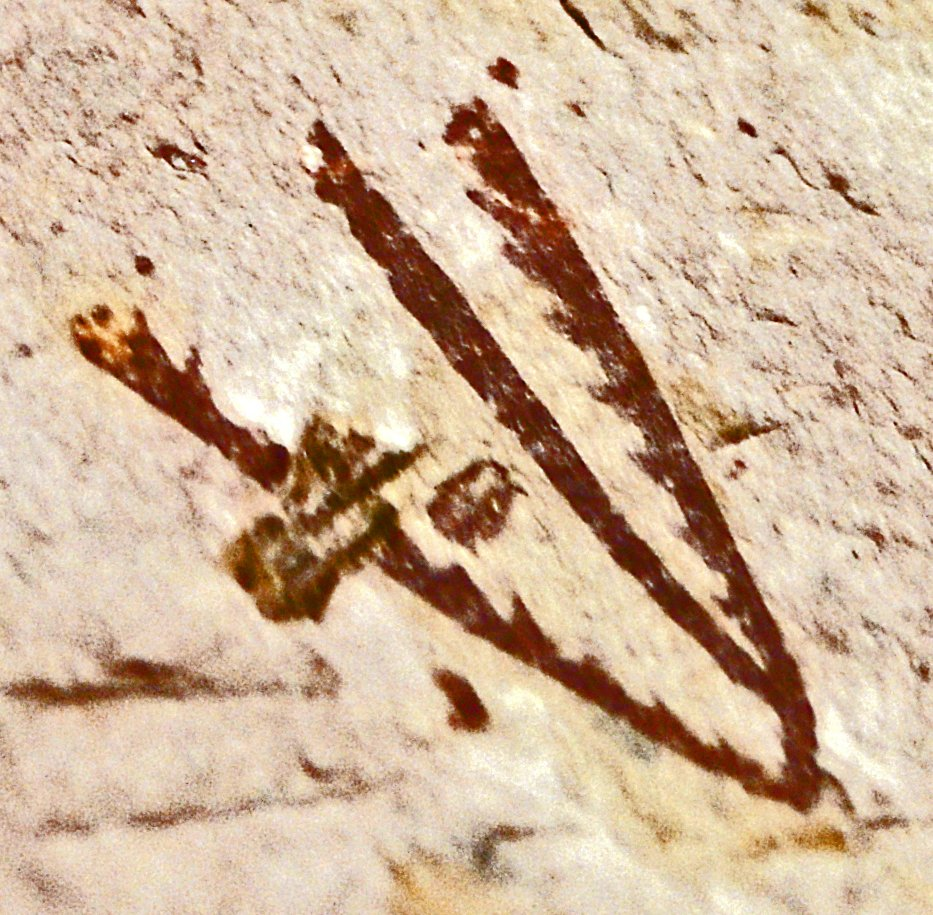
- Fossil of the Early Ordovician graptolite Phyllograptus
  †Phyllograptus
  - †Phyllograptus anna
- †Physalidopisthia – tentative report
- †Picnotreta
  - †Picnotreta lophocracenta
- †Pilekia – tentative report
- †Pinctus
- Pinna
  - †Pinna innexpectans
- †Pinnatulites
- †Pinyonastraea
- †Piochella
  - †Piochella peasleensis
- †Plagioglypta
- †Plagiura
  - †Plagiura extensa
  - †Plagiura minor
  - †Plagiura retracta
- †Planoarchaediscus
- †Platuzona – or unidentified comparable form
- †Platybolbina
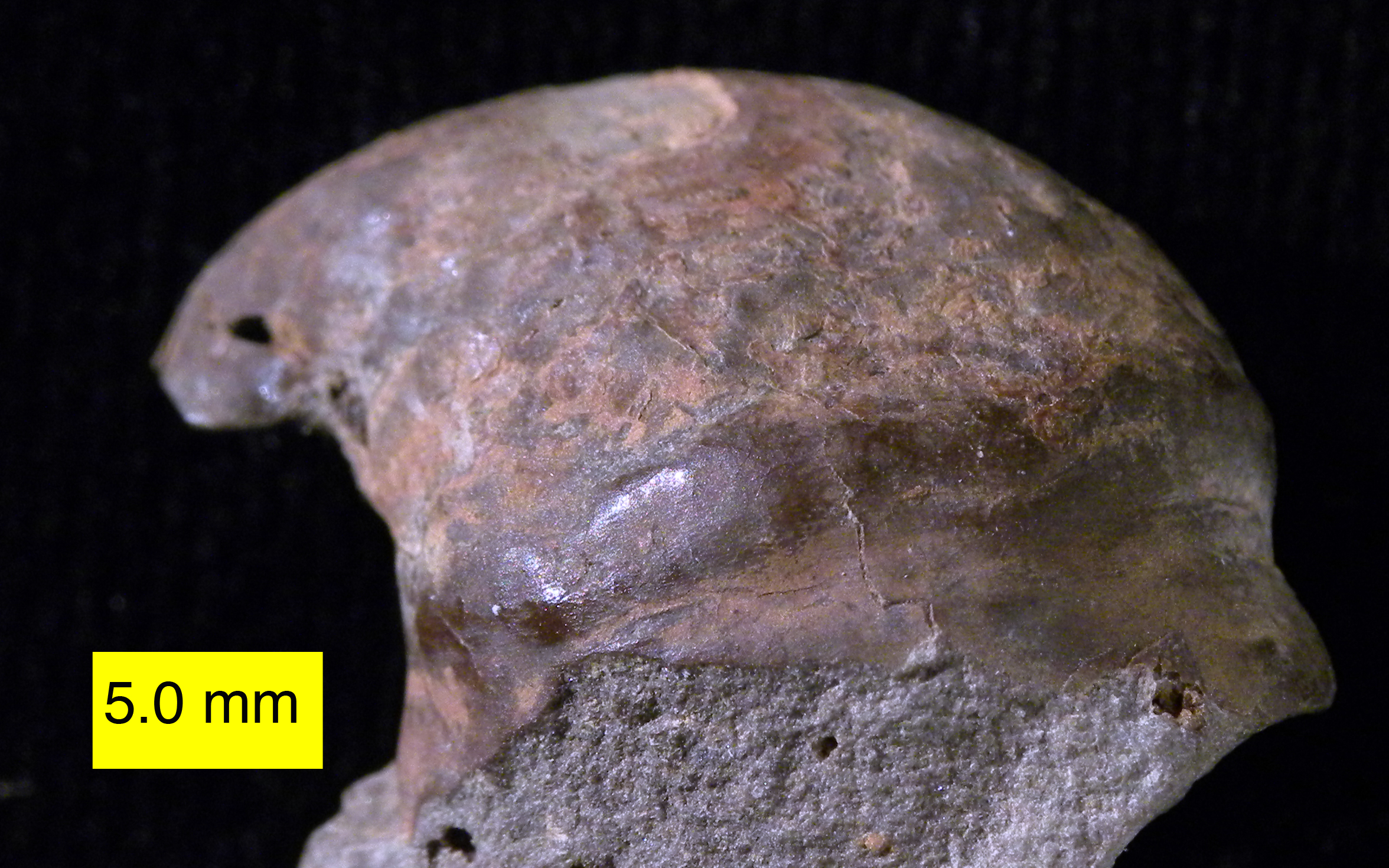
- Fossilized shell of the Silurian-Early Triassic sea snail Platyceras
  †Platyceras
  - †Platyceras trojani – type locality for species
- †Platycrinites
- †Platycrinus – tentative report
- †Platyschisma
- †Platystrophia
- †Platyterorhynchus
  - †Platyterorhynchus russelli
- †Platyworthenia
- †Platyzona
- †Plaxocrinus
  - †Plaxocrinus piutae
- †Plectatrypa
  - †Plectatrypa imbricata – or unidentified comparable form
- †Plectelasma
  - †Plectelasma type locality for species A – informal
  - †Plectelasma type locality for species B – informal
- †Plectodina
  - †Plectodina florida
  - †Plectodina tenuis
- †Plectogyra
  - †Plectogyra irregularis
  - †Plectogyra tumesepta
  - †Plectogyra tumula
- †Plectorthis
  - †Plectorthis obesa
  - †Plectorthis perplexus
- †Plectotrophia – tentative report
- †Pleiopleurina
  - †Pleiopleurina anticlastica
- †Plethopeltis
  - †Plethopeltis arbucklensis – or unidentified comparable form
- †Plethoschisma
  - †Plethoschisma grandis
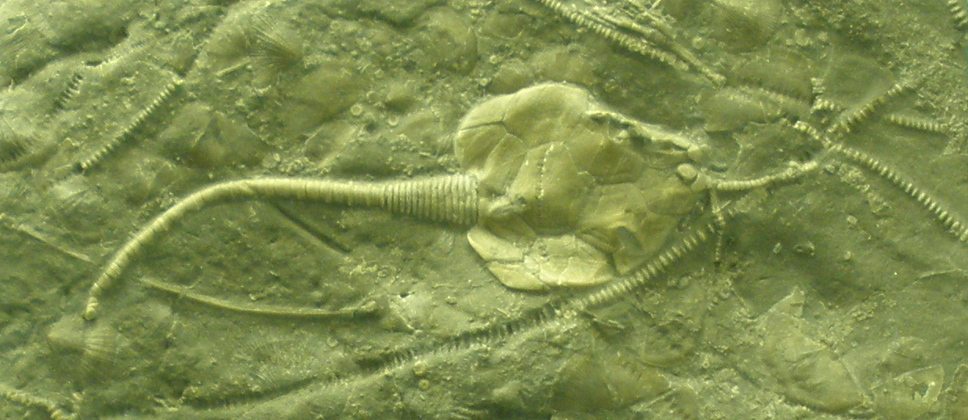
- Fossil of the Late Ordovician cystoid echinoderm Pleurocystites
  †Pleurocystites
- †Pleurograptus
  - †Pleurograptus lui
- †Pleurorima
  - †Pleurorima hoffmannae – type locality for species
- †Pleurorthis
  - †Pleurorthis beattyensis
- †Pleurosiphonella
- †Plicatolina
- †Plicocyathus
  - †Plicocyathus rozanovi
- †Plicoplasia
  - †Plicoplasia cooperi
- †Pliomeroides
- †Pliomerops
  - †Pliomerops canadensis – or unidentified comparable form
- †Plummericrinus
  - †Plummericrinus bulbosus
  - †Plummericrinus jelli
- †Polidevcia
  - †Polidevcia arctura – type locality for species
  - †Polidevcia bellistriata
  - †Polidevcia obesa
- †Poliella
  - †Poliella denticulata
  - †Poliella germana
  - †Poliella leipalox – type locality for species
  - †Poliella leipolox
  - †Poliella lomataspis
  - †Poliella ovala
  - †Poliella prima – or unidentified comparable form
- †Poliellaites
  - †Poliellaites gloriosa
- †Politicurus – tentative report
  - †Politicurus politus – or unidentified related form
- †Polusocrinus
  - †Polusocrinus amplus
- †Polygnathus
  - †Polygnathus abbessensis
  - †Polygnathus angusticostatus
  - †Polygnathus angustipennatus – or unidentified comparable form
  - †Polygnathus bagialensis
  - †Polygnathus benderi
  - †Polygnathus bultyncki
  - †Polygnathus costatus
  - †Polygnathus damelei – type locality for species
  - †Polygnathus eiflius
  - †Polygnathus gronbergi
  - †Polygnathus holynensis – type locality for species
  - †Polygnathus linguiformis
  - †Polygnathus parawebbi
  - †Polygnathus pseudofoliatus
  - †Polygnathus robertensis – type locality for species
  - †Polygnathus salixensis – type locality for species
  - †Polygnathus serotinus
- †Polyplucograptus
- †Polypora
  - †Polypora keyserlingiformis – type locality for species
  - †Polypora remota
  - †Polypora sargaensis
- †Polyporella
  - †Polyporella helgersonia – type locality for species
- †Polythalamia – type locality for genus
  - †Polythalamia americana – type locality for species
- †Pontisia
  - †Pontisia boodi
- †Porcellia
  - †Porcellia denayi
- †Poronileus
  - †Poronileus fistulosus
  - †Poronileus vallancei
- †Porosublastus
  - †Porosublastus inexpectus
- †Posidonia
  - †Posidonia becheri
- †Poteriocrinites
  - †Poteriocrinites permicus
- †Praedaraelites
  - †Praedaraelites loeblichi
- †Praenatica
- †Praewaagenoconcha
- †Prasopora
- †Prehousia
  - †Prehousia alata
  - †Prehousia impolita
  - †Prehousia indenta
  - †Prehousia prima
  - †Prehousia semicircularis
- †Presbynileus
  - †Presbynileus ibexensis
- †Primaspis
- †Prioniodina – tentative report
- †Priscella
- †Proaulopora
- †Prodentalium
  - †Prodentalium canna
- †Productella
- †Proehmaniella
  - †Proehmaniella hebes – tentative report
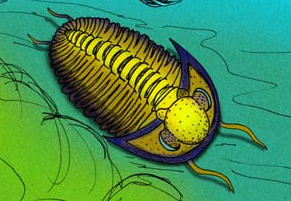
- Restoration of the Silurian trilobite Proetus
  †Proetus
- †Profallotaspis – tentative report
- †Profusulinella
  - †Profusulinella copiosa
  - †Profusulinella decora
- †Prolecanites
  - †Prolecanites lyoni
- †Promytilus
- †Proplina
  - †Proplina propina – or unidentified comparable form
- †Protathyris
  - †Protathyris hesperalis
- †Protocalymene
  - †Protocalymene mcallesteri
- †Protochonetes
  - †Protochonetes elyensis – type locality for species
- †Protocortezorthis
  - †Protocortezorthis windmillensis – type locality for species
- †Protoentactinia
  - †Protoentactinia gracilispinosa – type locality for species
  - †Protoentactinia latospinosa – type locality for species
  - †Protoentactinia minuta – type locality for species
- †Protopanderodus
  - †Protopanderodus insculptus
- †Protopharetra
  - †Protopharetra arcybata – type locality for species
  - †Protopharetra junensis
- †Protopliomerops
- †Protopresbynileus
  - †Protopresbynileus glaber – or unidentified comparable form
  - †Protopresbynileus wildeni
- †Protospongia
  - †Protospongia conica
  - †Protospongia spina – type locality for species
- †Prototreta
- †Protowentzelella
  - †Protowentzelella cystosa – type locality for species
  - †Protowentzelella kunthi – type locality for species
  - †Protowentzelella variabilis – type locality for species
- †Protozyga – tentative report
- †Psalikilus
  - †Psalikilus pikum
- †Psephosthenaspis
  - †Psephosthenaspis ellipsepyga
  - †Psephosthenaspis glabrior
  - †Psephosthenaspis pseudobathyurus
- †Pseudagnostus
  - †Pseudagnostus communis
  - †Pseudagnostus contracta – type locality for species
  - †Pseudagnostus josephus
- †Pseudedriophus
  - †Pseudedriophus guensburgi
- †Pseudoammodiscus
- †Pseudoatrypa – tentative report
  - †Pseudoatrypa percrassa
- †Pseudobatostomella
  - †Pseudobatostomella irregularis – type locality for species
- †Pseudobelodina
  - †Pseudobelodina inclinata
  - †Pseudobelodina kinki
  - †Pseudobelodina vulgaris
- †Pseudocybele
  - †Pseudocybele altinasuta
  - †Pseudocybele lemurei
  - †Pseudocybele nasuta
- †Pseudocystophora
  - †Pseudocystophora complexa
- †Pseudoendothyra
- †Pseudofusulinella
  - †Pseudofusulinella dunbari
  - †Pseudofusulinella jeffordsi – type locality for species
  - †Pseudofusulinella pusilla – type locality for species
  - †Pseudofusulinella rotunda
- †Pseudohystricurus
- †Pseudokingstonia
  - †Pseudokingstonia exotica
- †Pseudomera
  - †Pseudomera arachnopyge
  - †Pseudomera barrandei
- †Pseudomonotis
- †Pseudoneotodus
  - †Pseudoneotodus beckmanni
  - †Pseudoneotodus mitratus
- †Pseudoolenoides
  - †Pseudoolenoides acicaudus
  - †Pseudoolenoides dilectus – or unidentified comparable form
- †Pseudooneotodus
  - †Pseudooneotodus mitratus
- †Pseudoparazyga
  - †Pseudoparazyga cooperi
- †Pseudoreichelina
- †Pseudorthoceras
- †Pseudosaratogia
  - †Pseudosaratogia abnormis
  - †Pseudosaratogia leptogranulata
- †Pseudostaffella
  - †Pseudostaffella needhami
- †Pseudosyrinx
  - †Pseudosyrinx desiderata
- †Pseudotaxis
- †Pseudovermiporella
- †Pseudozaphrentoides
  - †Pseudozaphrentoides hanseni
  - †Pseudozaphrentoides trojana – type locality for species
- †Pseudozygopleura
- †Ptarmiganoides
  - †Ptarmiganoides araneicauda – type locality for species
  - †Ptarmiganoides crassaxis
  - †Ptarmiganoides hexacantha
  - †Ptarmiganoides lepida – tentative report
  - †Ptarmiganoides propinqua
- †Pterinopecten
  - †Pterinopecten spio
- †Pterocephalia
  - †Pterocephalia concava
  - †Pterocephalia elongata
  - †Pterocephalia punctata
  - †Pterocephalia sanctisabae
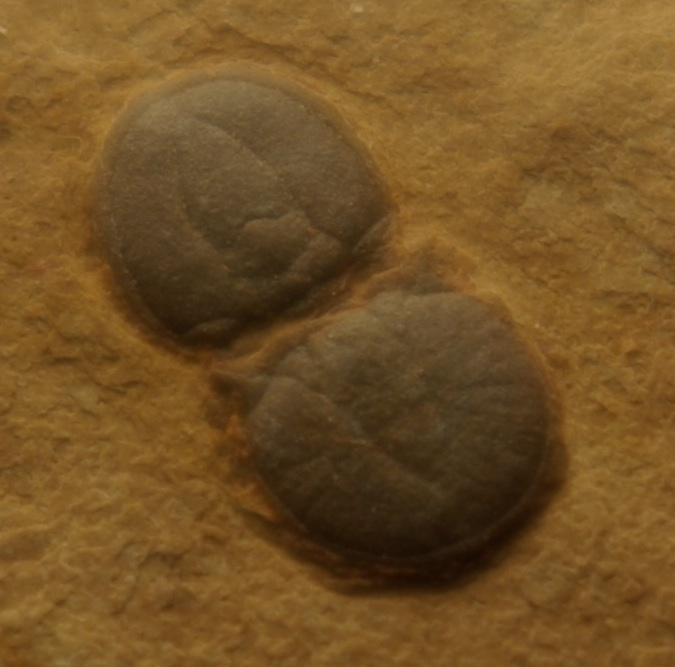
- Fossil of the Cambrian trilobite Ptychagnostus
  †Ptychagnostus
  - †Ptychagnostus atavus
  - †Ptychagnostus intermedius
  - †Ptychagnostus seminula
- †Ptychomphalina
  - †Ptychomphalina type locality for species – informal
- †Ptychophyllum – tentative report
- †Ptychopleurella
- †Ptychopleurites
  - †Ptychopleurites bevifrons – or unidentified comparable form
- †Ptyocephalus
  - †Ptyocephalus accliva
  - †Ptyocephalus vigilans
- †Pugilator
  - †Pugilator deckeri
- †Punctaparchites
- †Punctospirifer
  - †Punctospirifer gnomus – type locality for species
  - †Punctospirifer kentuckensis
  - †Punctospirifer kentuekyensis
- †Punka
  - †Punka caecata
- †Pycnostylus

== Q ==
- †Quadratia
  - †Quadratia hirsutiformis
- †Quadratonucula
  - †Quadratonucula stella – type locality for species
- †Quadricarina
  - †Quadricarina glabrobasis
  - †Quadricarina type locality for species A. – informal
- †Quadrithyris
  - †Quadrithyris minuens – or unidentified comparable form
  - †Quadrithyris vijaicus – or unidentified comparable form
- †Quadrochonetes
  - †Quadrochonetes type locality for species A – informal
- †Quasimodaspis
  - †Quasimodaspis brentsae

== R ==
- †Radiastraea
  - †Radiastraea arachne
  - †Radiastraea nevadensis
- †Radiastrea
- †Radiatrypa
  - †Radiatrypa advena
  - †Radiatrypa klukasi
- †Rafinesquina
- †Raphistoma
  - †Raphistoma gubanovi
- †Raymondaspis
  - †Raymondaspis vespertina
- †Raymondella
  - †Raymondella nevadensis
- †Raymondensis – tentative report
- †Raymondites – tentative report
- †Rayonnoceras
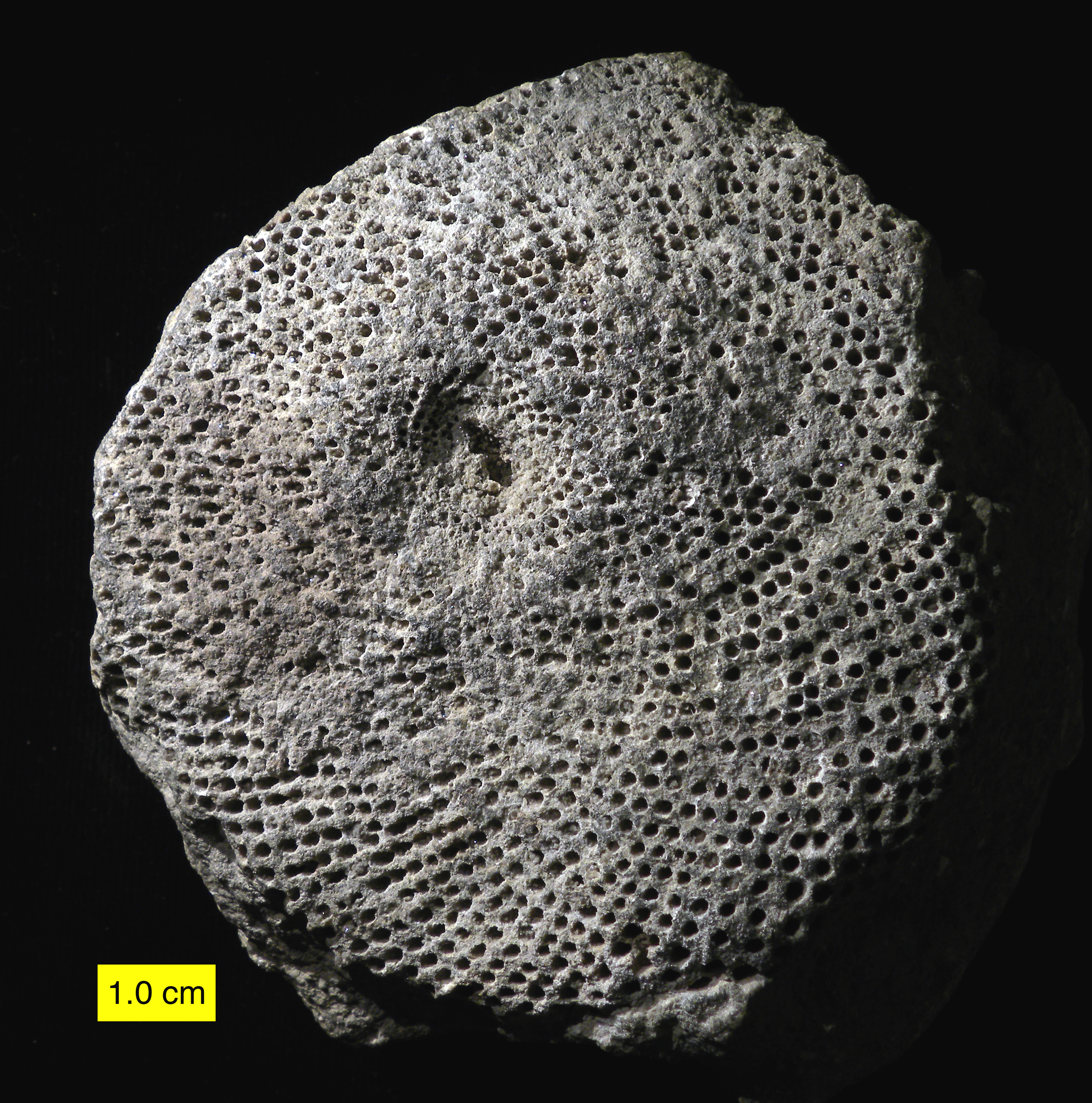
- Fossil of the Early Ordovician-Permian benthic alga Receptaculites
  †Receptaculites
- †Rectifenestella
  - †Rectifenestella cordiretiformis – type locality for species
  - †Rectifenestella tenax
- †Rectograptus
  - †Rectograptus abbreviatus
- †Remopleurides
  - †Remopleurides similus – or unidentified comparable form
  - †Remopleurides simulus – or unidentified comparable form
- †Renalcis
- †Rensselaeria
- †Rensselaerina
- †Rensselandia
  - †Rensselandia cloudi – type locality for species
- †Repinaella
- †Resserella
- †Reteporidra
  - †Reteporidra anaphora
- †Reticulariina
- †Reticularina
  - †Reticularina campestris
  - †Reticularina spinosa
- †Reticulariopsis
- †Retilamina
  - †Retilamina debrennei
- †Retispira
  - †Retispira albapinensis
  - †Retispira nolani – type locality for species
- †Rhabdiferoceras – type locality for genus
  - †Rhabdiferoceras annuliferum – type locality for species
- †Rhabdocyclus
  - †Rhabdocyclus depressus
- †Rhabdomeson
- †Rhipidomella
  - †Rhipidomella carbonaria
  - †Rhipidomella elyensis
  - †Rhipidomella nevadensis
- †Rhipidothyris
  - †Rhipidothyris circo – type locality for species
- †Rhizophyllum
  - †Rhizophyllum inornatum
- †Rhombifera
- †Rhombopora
  - †Rhombopora cornwallis
- †Rhombotrypella
  - †Rhombotrypella regularis
  - †Rhombotrypella sunfloweria
- †Rhynchocamara
  - †Rhynchocamara breviplicata – or unidentified comparable form
  - †Rhynchocamara sublaevis
- †Rhynchopora
  - †Rhynchopora taylori
- †Rhynchospirina
- †Rhynoleichus
  - †Rhynoleichus weeksi
- †Rhysostrophia
  - †Rhysostrophia nevadensis
  - †Rhysostrophia occidentalis
- †Rhyssochonetes
  - †Rhyssochonetes solox
- †Rimmyjimina
- †Rioceras – tentative report
- †Robergia
- †Robergiella
- †Rossaspis
- †Rossoceras
- †Rossodus – tentative report
  - †Rossodus tenuis
- †Rostranteris
  - †Rostranteris type locality for species A – informal
- †Rotopericyclus
  - †Rotopericyclus pinyonensis – type locality for species
- †Roundya
- †Rousseauspira
  - †Rousseauspira teicherti
- †Ruedemannoceras
- †Rugatia
  - †Rugatia occidentalis – or unidentified comparable form
- †Rugocoelia – type locality for genus
  - †Rugocoelia eganensis – type locality for species
- †Rugosochonetes

== S ==
- †Sabellidites
  - †Sabellidites canadiensis
- †Saffordophyllum
- †Sagittodontus
  - †Sagittodontus robustus – tentative report
- †Sallya
- †Salopina
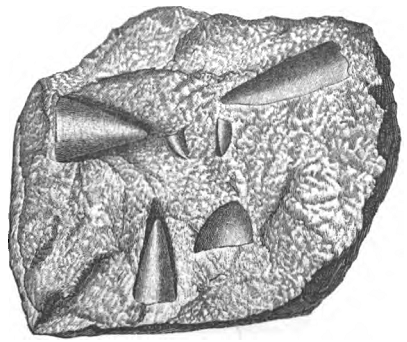
- Illustration of fossilized shells of the mysterious Cambrian organism Salterella
  †Salterella
- †Sandolasma
  - †Sandolasma buttense – type locality for species
  - †Sandolasma elegans
  - †Sandolasma hillae – type locality for species
  - †Sandolasma perplexa – type locality for species
- †Sanguinolites
  - †Sanguinolites salteri
- †Sansabella – tentative report
- †Scabbardella
  - †Scabbardella altipes
- †Scandodus
  - †Scandodus unicostatus
- †Scaphorthis
- †Sceptropora
  - †Sceptropora faculum
- †Schedexocrinus
- †Schistometopus
- †Schizambon
- †Schizodus
  - †Schizodus curtiformis
  - †Schizodus semistriatus – or unidentified comparable form
- †Schizophoria
  - †Schizophoria depressa
  - †Schizophoria fascicostella – or unidentified comparable form
  - †Schizophoria mcfarlanei
  - †Schizophoria nevadaensis
  - †Schizophoria parafragilis – type locality for species
  - †Schizophoria simpsoni
  - †Schizophoria texana
- †Schizoporia
  - †Schizoporia resupinoides
  - †Schizoporia texana
- †Schmidtella
- †Schmidtites – tentative report
- †Schubertella
  - †Schubertella kingi
- †Schuchertella
- †Schwagerina
  - †Schwagerina jeffordsi – type locality for species
  - †Schwagerina munda – type locality for species
  - †Schwagerina rotunda
- †Scinocephalus
  - †Scinocephalus solitecti – or unidentified related form
- †Sciophyllum
- †Scolopodus
  - †Scolopodus insculptus
- †Scotiaecystis – tentative report
- †Scotoharpes
- †Secuicollacta
  - †Secuicollacta stelligera – type locality for species
- †Selenimyalina
- †Semizona
  - †Semizona glindmeyeri
- †Septabrunsiina
- †Septaglomospiranella
- †Septatrypa
- †Septimyalina
  - †Septimyalina burmai
- †Septopora
  - †Septopora alternata
  - †Septopora bilateralis
- †Serpulospira
  - †Serpulospira annulatus – or unidentified comparable form
  - †Serpulospira swickae
- †Severella
- †Shamovella
- †Shastalasma
  - †Shastalasma woodi – type locality for species
- †Shoshonorthis
  - †Shoshonorthis swanensis – or unidentified comparable form
- †Shumardia
  - †Shumardia exopthalmus
- †Siderocyathus – type locality for genus
  - †Siderocyathus duncanae – type locality for species
- †Sieberella
  - †Sieberella problematica – or unidentified comparable form
  - †Sieberella pyriforma – type locality for species
- †Sigmocheilus
  - †Sigmocheilus flabellifer
  - †Sigmocheilus grata
  - †Sigmocheilus notha
  - †Sigmocheilus pogonipensis
- †Simulolenus
  - †Simulolenus granulatus
  - †Simulolenus quadrisulcatus
- †Sinotubuites
  - †Sinotubuites cienegensis
- †Sinuites
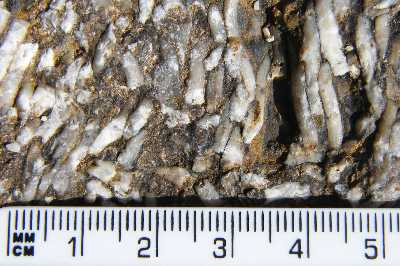
- Fossil of the Carboniferous colonial rugose coral Siphonodendron
  †Siphonodendron
  - †Siphonodendron sinousum – or unidentified comparable form
  - †Siphonodendron sinuosum – or unidentified comparable form
  - †Siphonodendron whitneyi – or unidentified comparable form
- †Siphonodendrum
  - †Siphonodendrum sinuosum – or unidentified comparable form
- †Sivorthis
  - †Sivorthis eucharis
  - †Sivorthis occidentalis
- †Skenidioides
  - †Skenidioides oklahomensis
- †Skenidium
  - †Skenidium asellatum – or unidentified comparable form
- †Skippella
- †Soleniscus
- †Sowerbyella
  - †Sowerbyella merriami
  - †Sowerbyella perplexa – or unidentified comparable form
- †Sowerbyites
- †Spathognathodus
  - †Spathognathodus minutus – or unidentified comparable form
- †Spencia
  - †Spencia quadrata – type locality for species
- †Sphaerirhynchia
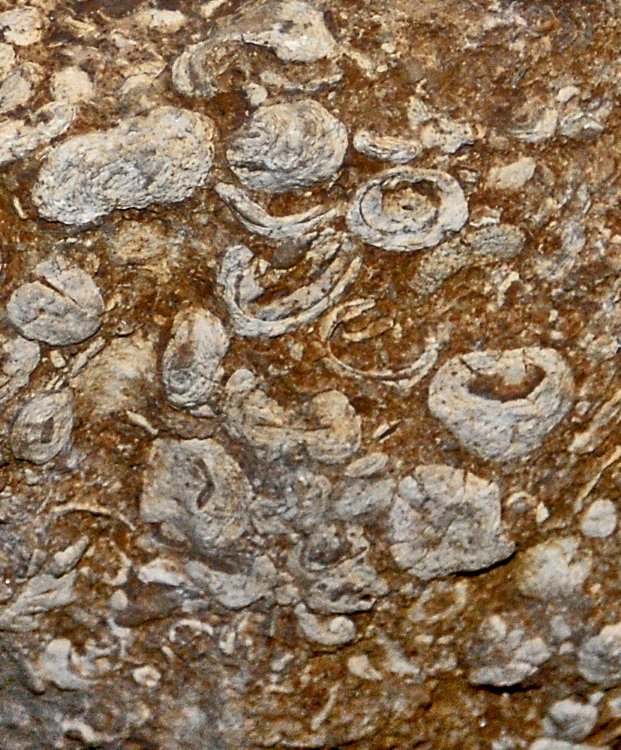
- Assemblage of fossils of the Ordovician-Triassic blue-green alga Sphaerocodium
  †Sphaerocodium
- †Sphaerocoryphe
- †Sphenosteges
  - †Sphenosteges hispidus
- †Sphenothallus
- †Sphenotreta
  - †Sphenotreta sulcata – or unidentified comparable form
- †Spinatrypa
  - †Spinatrypa aspera – or unidentified comparable form
  - †Spinatrypa soetenica – or unidentified comparable form
- †Spinatrypina
  - †Spinatrypina angusticostata
  - †Spinatrypina comitata – or unidentified comparable form
  - †Spinatrypina lamellosa
  - †Spinatrypina recula – type locality for species
- †Spinella
  - †Spinella talenti – type locality for species
- †Spinoplasia
  - †Spinoplasia roeni – type locality for species
- †Spinulicosta
  - †Spinulicosta muirwoodi
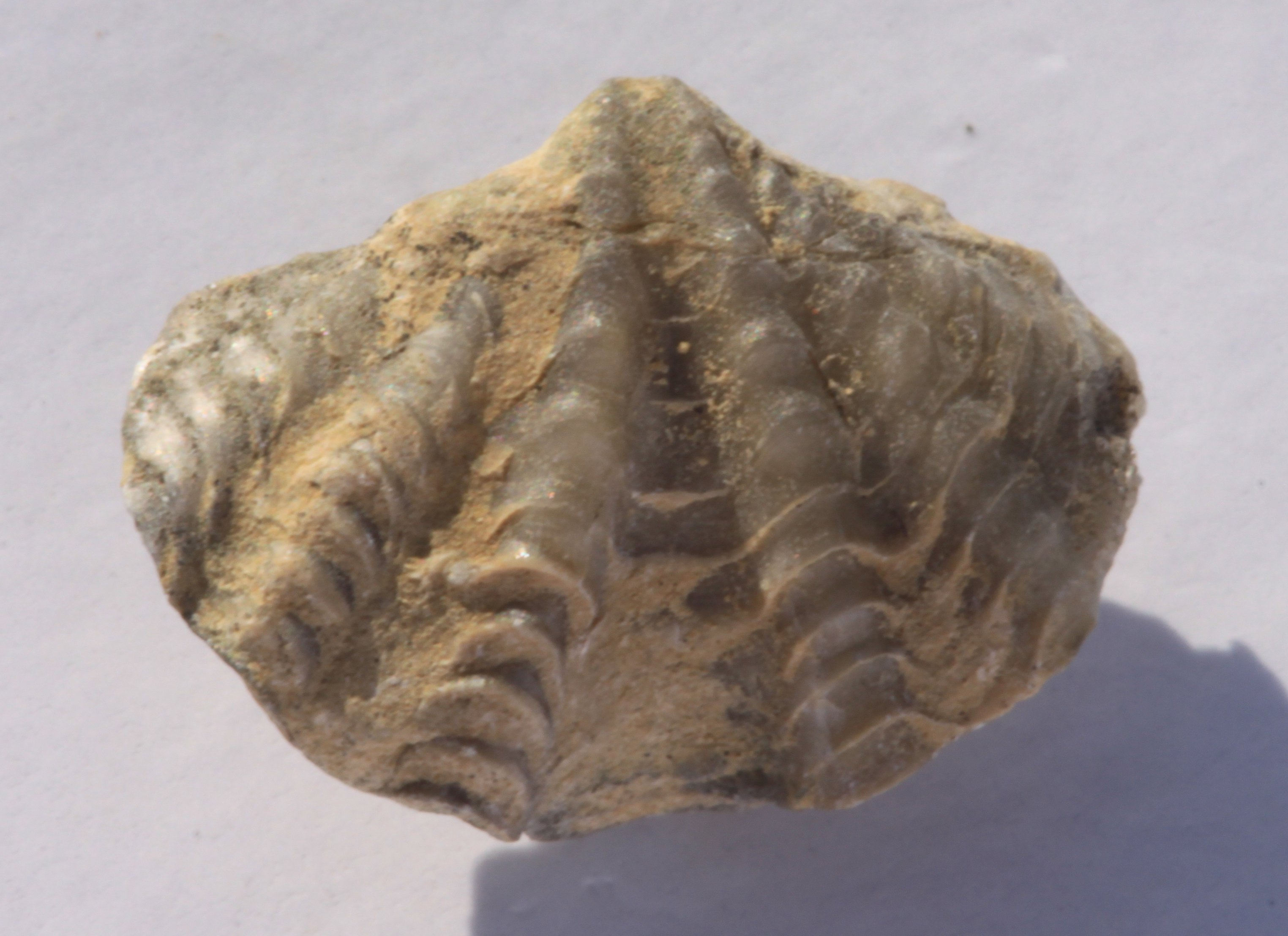
- Fossilized shell of the Late Ordovician-Late Triassic brachiopod Spirifer
  †Spirifer
  - †Spirifer arkansanus – or unidentified comparable form
  - †Spirifer centronatus
  - †Spirifer haydenianus – or unidentified related form
  - †Spirifer occidus
  - †Spirifer opimus
  - †Spirifer pellaensis – tentative report
  - †Spirifer rockymontanus
- †Spiriferella
  - †Spiriferella scobina – type locality for species
- †Spiriferellina
  - †Spiriferellina campestris
  - †Spiriferellina ceres
  - †Spiriferellina lata
- †Spiriferina
- †Spirigerina
  - †Spirigerina supramarginalis
- †Spirinella
  - †Spirinella pauciplicata
- †Spirocyathella – tentative report
  - †Spirocyathella microporosa – type locality for species
- †Spirodentalium
  - †Spirodentalium walcotti – type locality for species
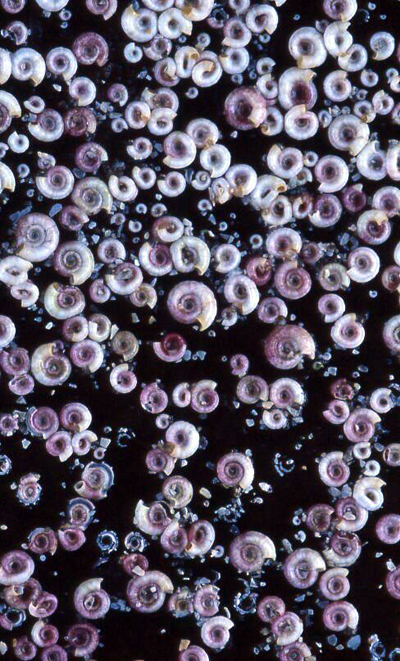
- Modern shells of the polychaete worm Spirorbis
  Spirorbis
- †Spongophyllum
- †Spygoria – type locality for genus
  - †Spygoria zappania – type locality for species
- †Squamaria
- †Squameofavosites
- †Stachyodes
- †Staffella
  - †Staffella expansa
- †Staufferella
- †Stauromatidium
- †Stegnopsis
- †Stegocoelia
- †Stelechophyllum – tentative report
- †Stellahexaformis – type locality for genus
  - †Stellahexaformis gersterensis – type locality for species
- †Stellarocrinus
  - †Stellarocrinus comptus
  - †Stellarocrinus cuneatus
- †Stenambon
  - †Stenambon megagranulus
  - †Stenambon paucigranulus
- †Stenodiscus
  - †Stenodiscus murdockensis – type locality for species
- †Stenoglaphyrites
  - †Stenoglaphyrites hesperius
  - †Stenoglaphyrites merriami
- †Stenoloron
  - †Stenoloron minor
- †Stenopecrinus – tentative report
  - †Stenopecrinus xerophilus
- †Stenopora
  - †Stenopora parvaexozona – type locality for species
- †Stenothecoides
- †Stephenaspis
  - †Stephenaspis avitus – type locality for species
  - †Stephenaspis highlandensis
- †Stereodictyum
  - †Stereodictyum proteron – type locality for species
- †Stereolasma
- †Stereostylus
  - †Stereostylus compressum
- †Stibaraster
- †Stictoporella
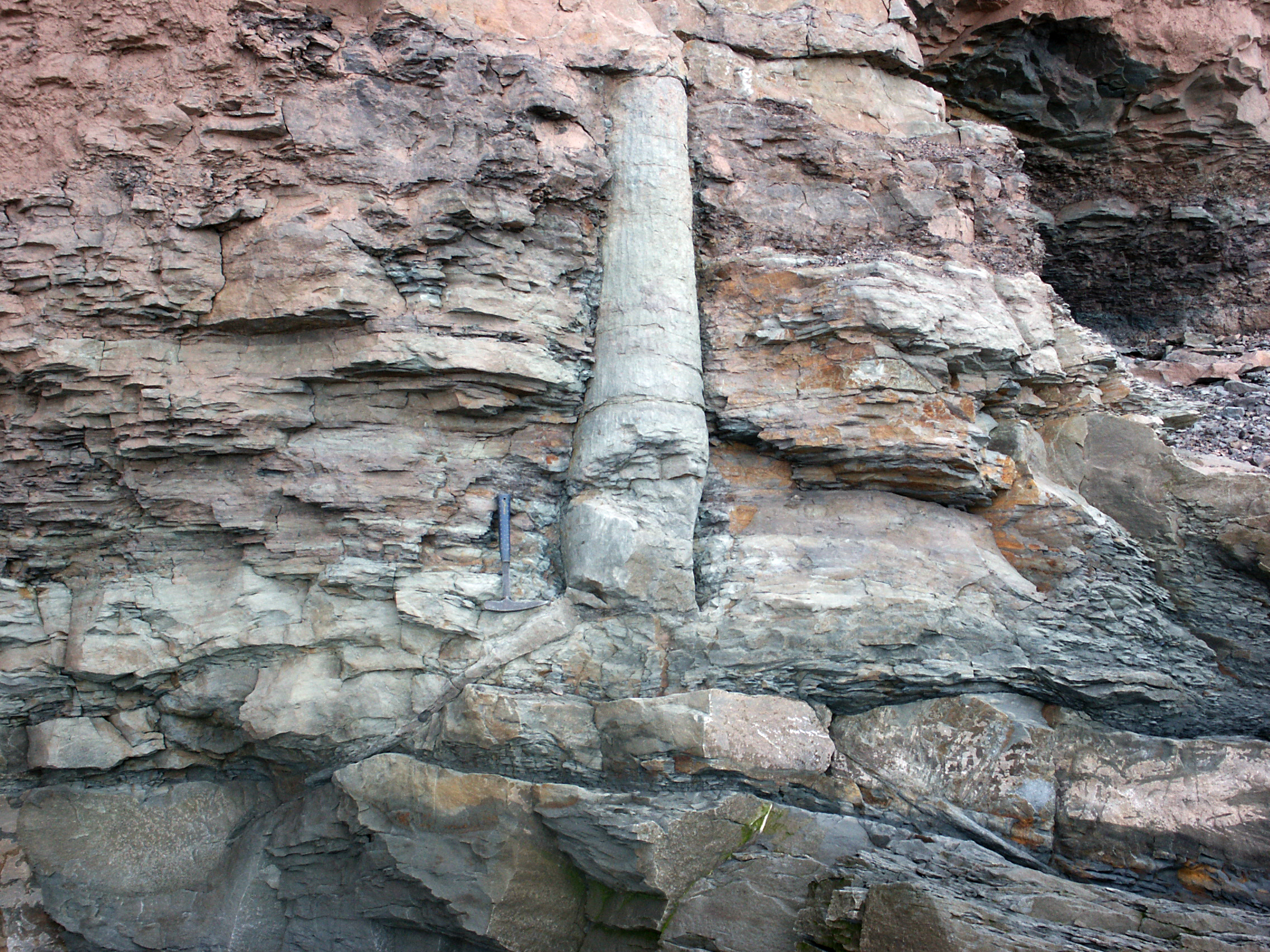
- Fossil preserved in situ of a Carboniferous tree-like club moss relative with attached Stigmaria rhizome system
  †Stigmaria
  - †Stigmaria wedingtonensis
- †Strachanognathus
  - †Strachanognathus parvus
- †Straparollus
  - †Straparollus caementarius
  - †Straparollus lonemountainensis
  - †Straparollus spergenensis – or unidentified related form
- †Streblochondria
- †Streblopteria
  - †Streblopteria similis
- †Streblotrypa
  - †Streblotrypa elongata – type locality for species
- †Streptacis
- †Streptelasma
  - †Streptelasma prolongatum
- †Streptognathodus
  - †Streptognathodus unicornis
- †Streptorhynchus
- †Streptosolen
  - †Streptosolen mccafferyi – type locality for species
  - †Streptosolen nodosus – type locality for species
  - †Streptosolen occidentalis
- †Strianematina
- †Striatifera
- †Striatopora
- †Strigambitus
  - †Strigambitus bilobus
  - †Strigambitus transversus
  - †Strigambitus utahensis
- †Strigigenalis
- †Stringocephalus
  - †Stringocephalus nevadensis – type locality for species
- †Strobeus
- †Stromatopora
- †Strombodes
- †Stropheodonta
  - †Stropheodonta filicosta
  - †Stropheodonta magnacosta – type locality for species
- †Stropheodontida
- †Strophochonetes
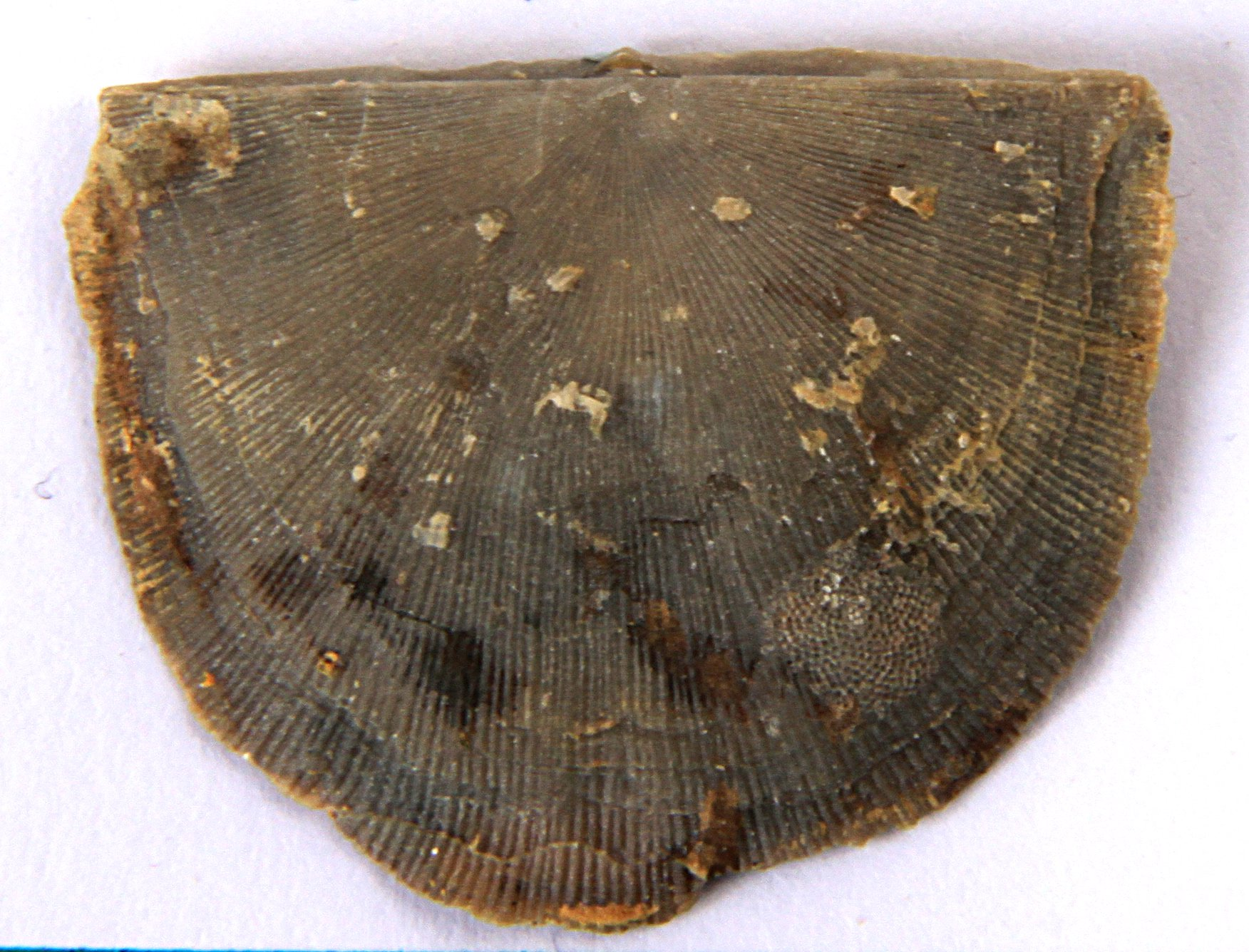
- Fossilized shell of the Ordovician-Silurian brachiopod Strophomena
  †Strophomena
- †Strophonella
  - †Strophonella bohemica – or unidentified comparable form
  - †Strophonella punctulifera – or unidentified comparable form
- †Strophostylus
  - †Strophostylus nevadensis – type locality for species
  - †Strophostylus tantillus – type locality for species
- †Stuartwellercrinus
  - †Stuartwellercrinus corbatoi
- †Stummelasma
  - †Stummelasma antelopense
  - †Stummelasma lonense
  - †Stummelasma sulfurense – type locality for species
- †Stygina – tentative report
- †Styliolina
- †Stylonema – tentative report
- †Stylopleura
  - †Stylopleura berthiaumi
  - †Stylopleura nevadensis
- †Styracograptus
  - †Styracograptus mississippiensis
  - †Styracograptus tatianae
- †Subrensselandia
  - †Subrensselandia nolani
- †Subrensselendia
- †Subretepora
- †Subulites
- †Sulcoretepora
  - †Sulcoretepora corticata
  - †Sulcoretepora irregularis
- †Sychnoelasma
  - †Sychnoelasma alrichanum – or unidentified comparable form
  - †Sychnoelasma ulrichanum – or unidentified comparable form
- †Symphysurina
  - †Symphysurina walcotti
- †Synarmocrinus
  - †Synarmocrinus brachiatus – type locality for species
- †Syndielasma
  - †Syndielasma biseptatum
- †Syngastrioceras
- †Synprioniodina – tentative report
- †Syntrophina – tentative report
- †Syntrophopsis
  - †Syntrophopsis polita
- †Synyphocrinus
  - †Synyphocrinus permicus
- †Syringaxon
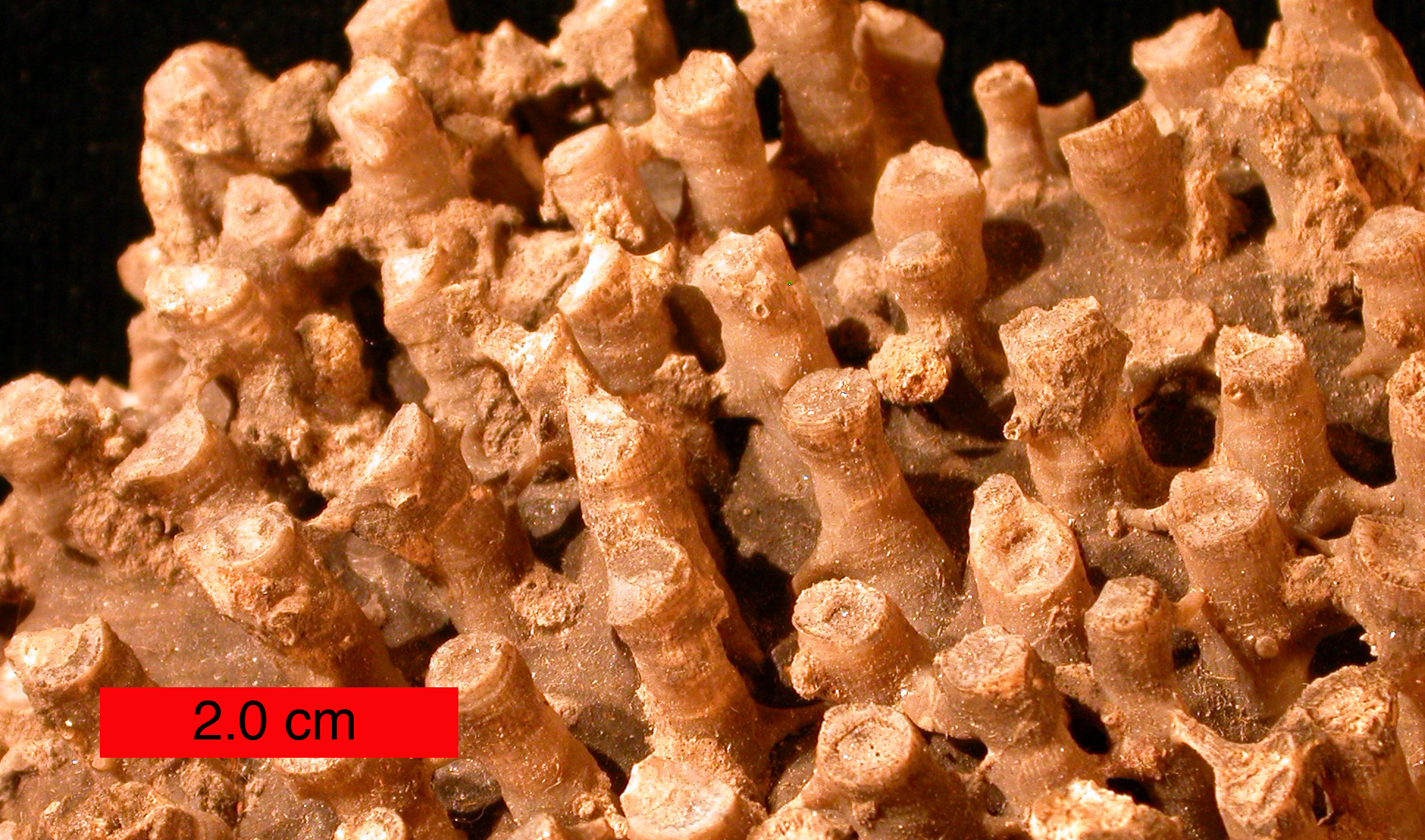
- Fossil of the Devonian tabulate coral Syringopora
  †Syringopora
  - †Syringopora surcularia
- †Syringostroma
- †Syspacephalus
  - †Syspacephalus crassus
  - †Syspacephalus laticeps – or unidentified comparable form
  - †Syspacephalus longus
  - †Syspacephalus uncus – tentative report
  - †Syspacephalus variosus – type locality for species

== T ==
- †Tabulipora
  - †Tabulipora carbonaria – type locality for species
  - †Tabulipora hispida
- †Tabulophyllum
- †Taenora
  - †Taenora expansa
- †Tancrediopsis
  - †Tancrediopsis cuneata – or unidentified related form
- †Taphrodonta
  - †Taphrodonta parallela
- †Tapinotomaria
- †Tecnocyrtina
  - †Tecnocyrtina fissiplicata
  - †Tecnocyrtina missouriensis
- †Tegerocyathus
  - †Tegerocyathus edelsteini
- †Teichertina
  - †Teichertina americana – type locality for species
  - †Teichertina fitzroyensis
- †Teiichispira
  - †Teiichispira auricula – type locality for species
- †Telephina
- †Temnocheilus
- †Temnophyllum
  - †Temnophyllum waltheri – type locality for species
- †Tentaculites
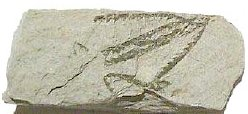
- Fossils of the Early-Late Ordovician graptolite Tetragraptus
  †Tetragraptus
  - †Tetragraptus bigsbyi
- †Tetraprioniodus – tentative report
  - †Tetraprioniodus costatus
- †Tetrataxis
  - †Tetrataxis angusta
- †Texacrinus
  - †Texacrinus distortus
- †Thamniscus
  - †Thamniscus erraticus – type locality for species
- †Thamnopora
  - †Thamnopora limitaris
- †Thamnosia
  - †Thamnosia depressa
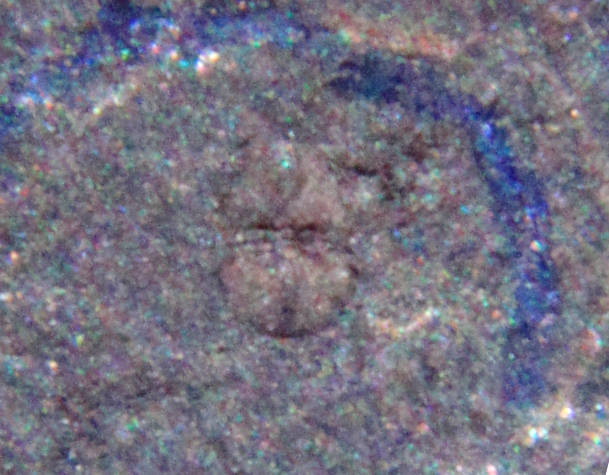
- Fossil of the Cambrian trilobite Thoracocare
  †Thoracocare
  - †Thoracocare idahoensis
- †Tikhinella
- †Timaniella
  - †Timaniella pseudocamerata – or unidentified comparable form
- †Timanodictya
  - †Timanodictya dichotoma – or unidentified comparable form
- †Toernquistia – tentative report
- †Tonkinaria
  - †Tonkinaria simpsoni
- †Tonkinella
  - †Tonkinella breviceps
  - †Tonkinella valida
- †Tonopahella – type locality for genus
  - †Tonopahella goldfieldensis – type locality for species
- †Toquimaella
  - †Toquimaella kayi – type locality for species
- †Toquimaphyllum
  - †Toquimaphyllum johnsoni
  - †Toquimaphyllum sentum – type locality for species
  - †Toquimaphyllum vulgare – type locality for species
- †Toquimia
  - †Toquimia kirki
- †Tortodus
  - †Tortodus australis
  - †Tortodus kockelianus
- †Torynifer
  - †Torynifer internascens – or unidentified comparable form
- †Totiglobus – type locality for genus
  - †Totiglobus nimius – type locality for species
- †Trachycheilus
  - †Trachycheilus whirlwindensis
- †Trachydomia
- †Trachyspira
- †Trampidocrinus
  - †Trampidocrinus bellicus
  - †Trampidocrinus phiola
- †Trematopora
- †Trematorthis
  - †Trematorthis tenuis
- †Trematospira
  - †Trematospira perforata
- †Trepospira
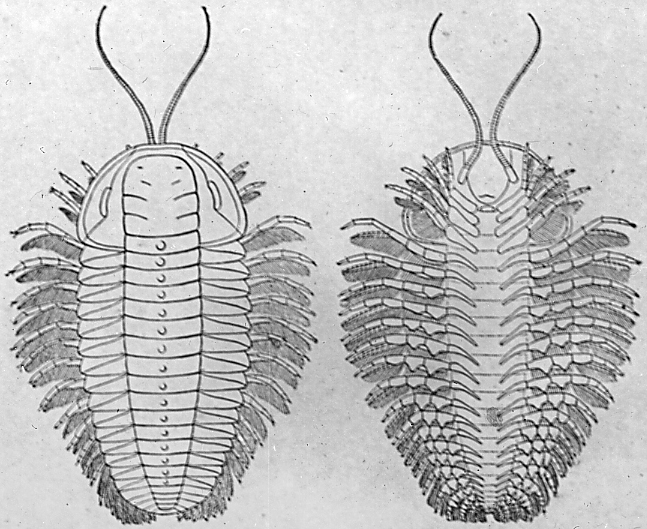
- Restoration showing the top (left) and underside of the Late Ordovician trilobite Triarthrus
  †Triarthrus
- †Trichonodella
  - †Trichonodella barbara – or unidentified comparable form
- †Trigonirhynchia
  - †Trigonirhynchia occidens
- †Trigonocerca
  - †Trigonocerca typica
- †Trigrammaria
- †Trinodus
- †Tritoechia
  - †Tritoechia sinuata
- †Trocholites
- †Trochonema – tentative report
- †Tropidodiscus
- †Trupetostroma
- †Tryplasma
  - †Tryplasma duncanae
  - †Tryplasma radicula
- †Tschussovskenia
  - †Tschussovskenia connorsensis – type locality for species
  - †Tschussovskenia dilata
- †Tuberitina
- †Tumicephalus
  - †Tumicephalus depressus
- †Turbonitella
  - †Turbonitella biserialis – or unidentified related form
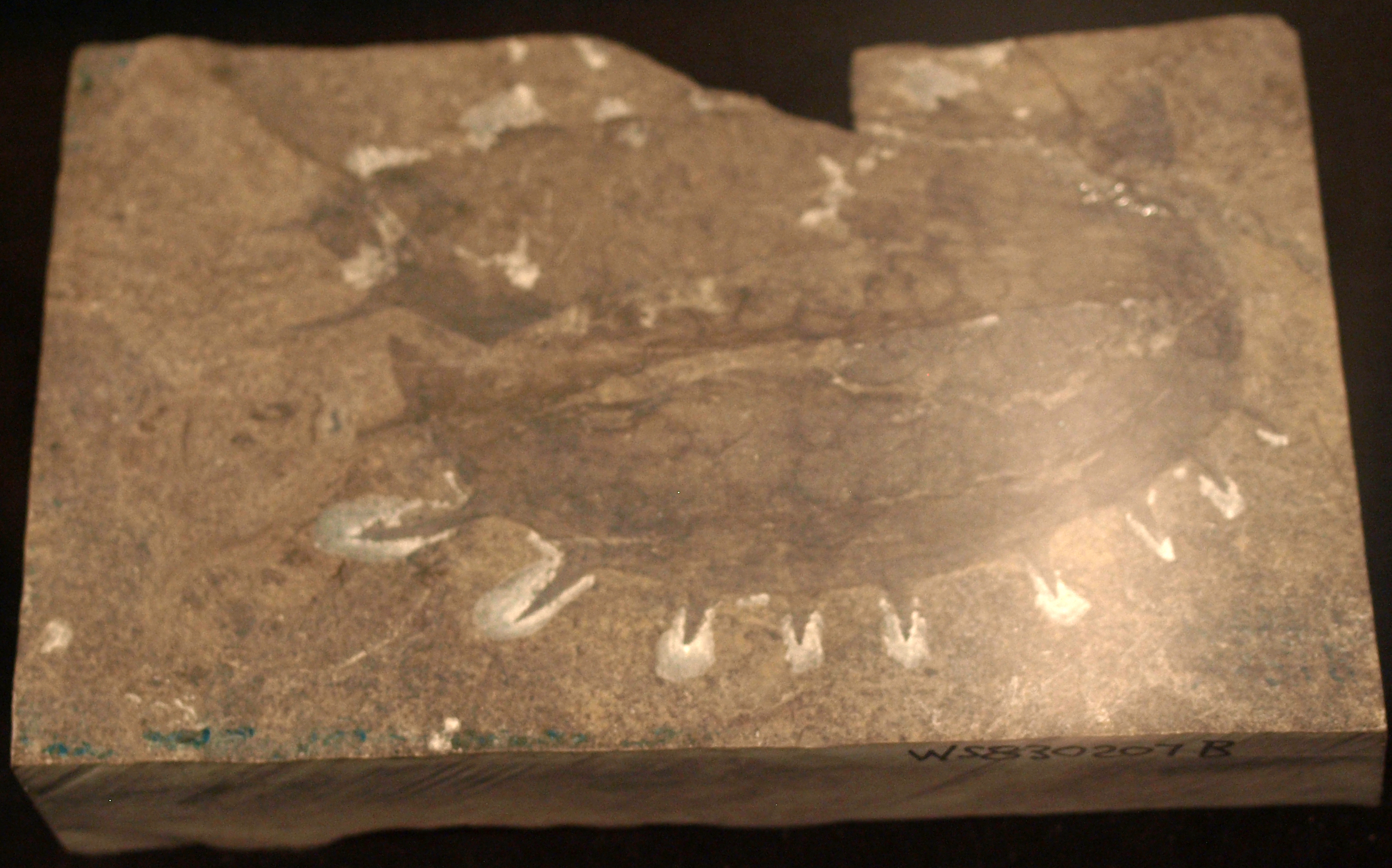
- Fossilized shell of the Cambrian arthropod Tuzoia
  †Tuzoia
- †Tyersella
- †Tylonautilus
- †Tylothyris
- †Tympanuella
  - †Tympanuella transversa

== U ==
- †Ufimia
- †Undispirifer
- †Uraloceras
  - †Uraloceras burtiense
  - †Uraloceras involutum
  - †Uraloceras nevadense – type locality for species
- †Uromystrum
  - †Uromystrum validum – or unidentified comparable form
- †Ursinella – type locality for genus
  - †Ursinella major – type locality for species
- †Utharocrinus

== V ==
- †Vagrania
  - †Vagrania gronbergi
- †Valcourea
  - †Valcourea intracarinata
  - †Valcourea plana
  - †Valcourea transversa
- †Vallomyonia
  - †Vallomyonia claudiae
  - †Vallomyonia devonica
- †Varatrypa
- †Vargania
  - †Vargania gronbergi
- †Variatrypa
  - †Variatrypa exoleta
  - †Variatrypa licta – type locality for species
- †Varvia – tentative report
- †Verpaspongia – type locality for genus
  - †Verpaspongia nodosa – type locality for species
- †Verticillopora
- †Vesiculophyllum
- †Vesperispira – type locality for genus
  - †Vesperispira humboldtiana – type locality for species
- †Vidronovella
  - †Vidronovella fastigiata
- †Virgiana
  - †Virgiana utahensis – type locality for species
- †Volocephalina
  - †Volocephalina connexa
  - †Volocephalina variosa – type locality for species
- †Volocphalina
  - †Volocphalina variosa – type locality for species

== W ==
- †Waagenella
  - †Waagenella vespertinus – type locality for species
- †Waagenites
  - †Waagenites type locality for species A – informal
  - †Waagenites type locality for species B – informal
- †Waagenoconcha – tentative report
- †Walliserodus
  - †Walliserodus amplissimus
  - †Walliserodus curvatus
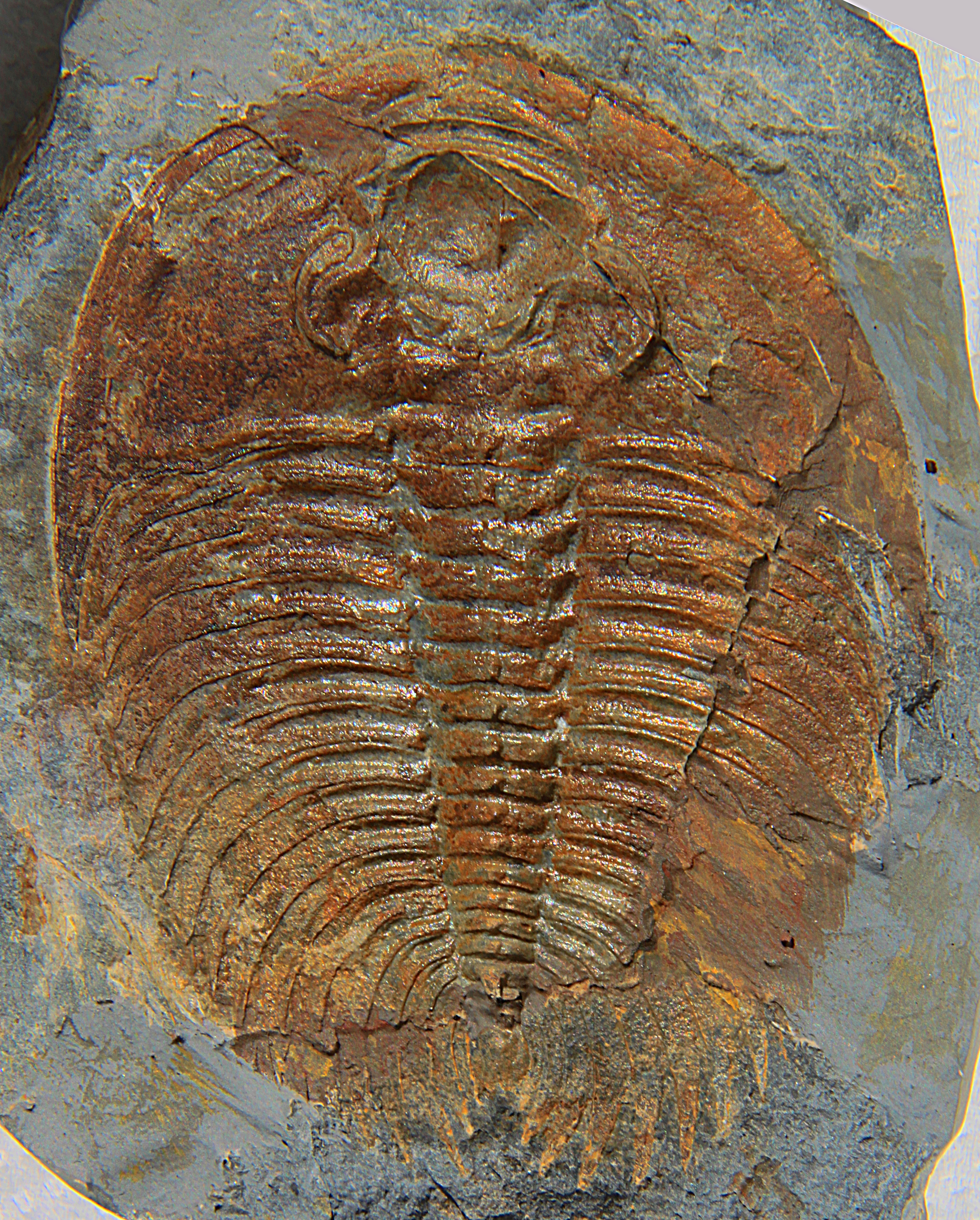
- Fossil of the Cambrian trilobite Wanneria
  †Wanneria
  - †Wanneria walcottana – or unidentified comparable form
- †Warburgella
  - †Warburgella rugulosa
- †Warrenella
  - †Warrenella franklinii
  - †Warrenella kirki
  - †Warrenella nevadensis
  - †Warrenella occidentalis
  - †Warrenella plicata
  - †Warrenella praekirki
- †Watsonella
- †Weirchellatia
- †Wellerella
  - †Wellerella delicatula – or unidentified comparable form
  - †Wellerella osagensis
  - †Wellerella truncata
- †Wendoverella – type locality for genus
  - †Wendoverella arca – type locality for species
- †Wenkchemnia
  - †Wenkchemnia sulcata
  - †Wenkchemnia walcotti
- †Westergaardites
- †Westmontia
  - †Westmontia devilensis
- †Weyerides – tentative report
- †Whittingtonia – tentative report
- †Wilberrya
  - †Wilberrya fragilis
- †Williamicyathus
- †Wilsonastraea
  - †Wilsonastraea fraseri – type locality for species
  - †Wilsonastraea parva – type locality for species
  - †Wilsonastraea smithi
- †Wimanella – tentative report
- †Winchellatia
- †Wjatkella
  - †Wjatkella hemiseptifera – type locality for species
  - †Wjatkella permiana
- †Worthenia
  - †Worthenia corrugata
- †Wujiajiania
  - †Wujiajiania sutherlandi
- †Wutinoceras
  - †Wutinoceras huygenae – or unidentified comparable form

== X ==
- †Xenelasma – tentative report
- †Xenocheilos
  - †Xenocheilos granulosus
- †Xenostegium
  - †Xenostegium franklinense – or unidentified comparable form
- †Xestotrema
  - †Xestotrema pulchrum – type locality for species
- †Xystocrania
  - †Xystocrania perforator
  - †Xystocrania pyriformis – type locality for species

== Y ==
- †Yakovlevia
  - †Yakovlevia multistriata – type locality for species
- †Yinograptus
  - †Yinograptus disjunctus
- †Yochelsonospira
  - †Yochelsonospira tenuilineata
- Yoldia
- †Youngia – tentative report
- †Yuknessaspis
  - †Yuknessaspis benningtonis
- †Yunnania

== Z ==
- †Zacanthoides
  - †Zacanthoides alatus – or unidentified comparable form
  - †Zacanthoides demissus
  - †Zacanthoides divergensis
  - †Zacanthoides variacantha
  - †Zacanthoides walapai
- †Zacanthopsina – type locality for genus
  - †Zacanthopsina eperephes – type locality for species
- †Zacanthopsis
  - †Zacanthopsis contractus – type locality for species
  - †Zacanthopsis levis
- †Zelophyllum – tentative report
- †Zonophyllum
  - †Zonophyllum lonense
  - †Zonophyllum robertsense
- †Zygognathus
- †Zygospira
