= List of the Paleozoic life of Alabama =

This list of the Paleozoic life of Alabama contains the various prehistoric life-forms whose fossilized remains have been reported from within the US state of Alabama and are between 538.8 and 252.17 million years of age.

== A ==
- †Acanthambonia
  - †Acanthambonia miiiutissima
- †Acanthopecten
- †Acrocrinus
- †Adetognathus
  - †Adetognathus unicornis
- †Agaeoleptoptera – type locality for genus
  - †Agaeoleptoptera uniotempla – type locality for species
- †Agassizocrinus
- †Alaskadiscus
  - †Alaskadiscus subacutus – or unidentified comparable form
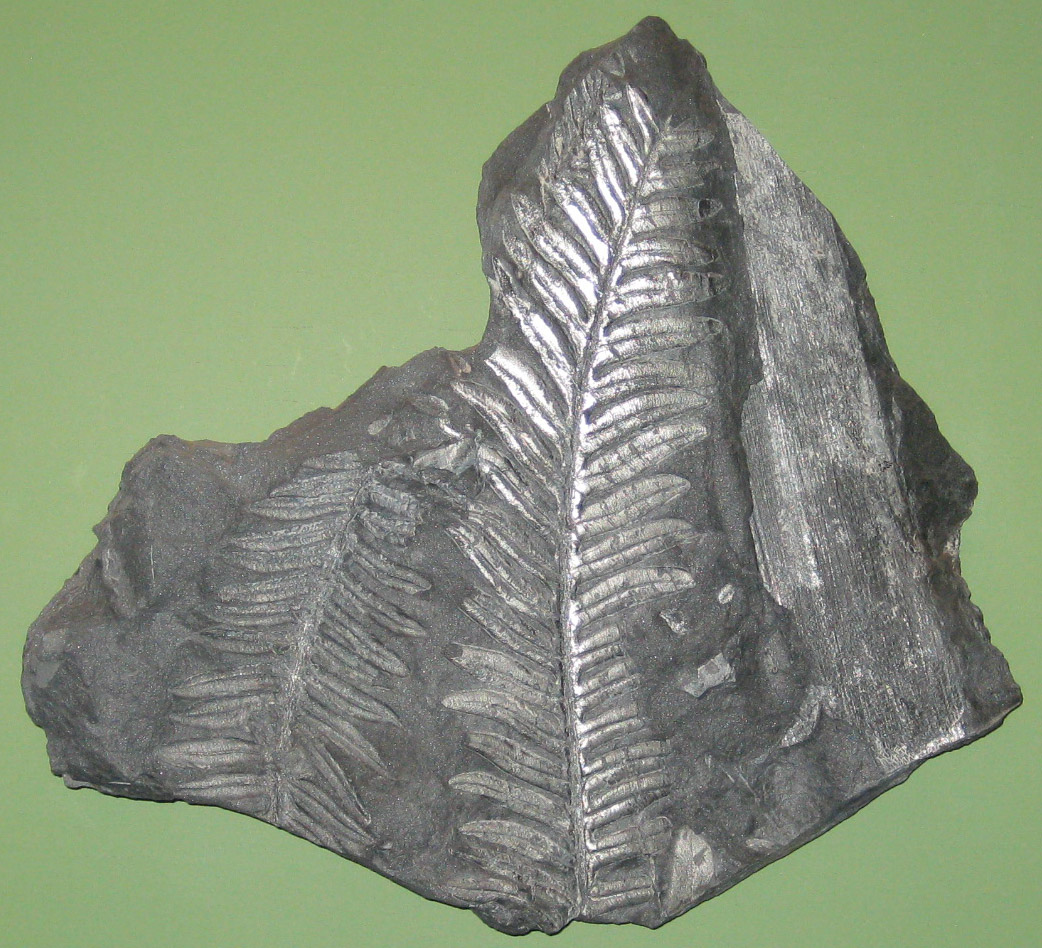
- Fossilized fronds of the Carboniferous-Early Cretaceous seed fern Alethopteris
  †Alethopteris
  - †Alethopteris lonchitica
  - †Alethopteris valida
- †Allegacrinus
- †Allocatillocrinus
- †Alloiopteris
- †Amphiscapha – tentative report
- †Amplexopora
- †Anisopleurella
  - †Anisopleurella tricostellata
- †Anniedarwinia – type locality for genus
  - †Anniedarwinia alabamensis – type locality for species
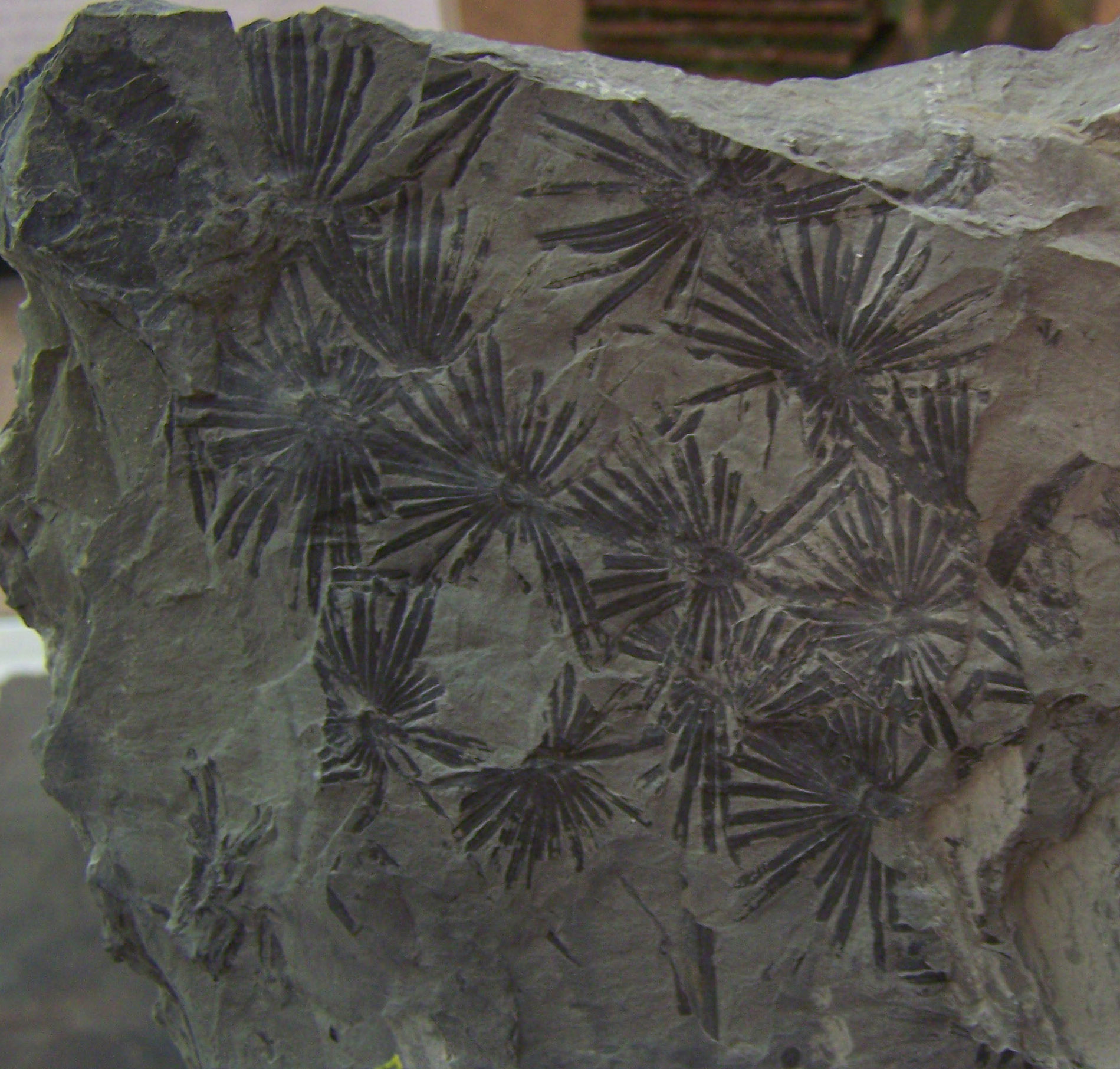
- Fossil of the Carboniferous horsetail relative Annularia
  †Annularia
  - †Annularia radiata
  - †Annularia sphenophylloides
- †Annuliconcha
- †Anoptambonites
  - †Anoptambonites pulchra
- †Anthracospirifer
  - †Anthracospirifer increbescens
  - †Anthracospirifer leidyi
- †Aphelacrinus
- †Aphelaspis
  - †Aphelaspis buttsi
- †Aphelecrinus
- †Arborichnus
  - †Arborichnus repetita
- †Archimedes
- †Arenicolites
  - †Arenicolites longistriatus – type locality for species
- †Armenocrinus
- †Artisia
- †Ascopora
- †Aspidagnostus
  - †Aspidagnostus rugosus
- †Aspidiopsis
- †Astartella – tentative report
- †Asterophyllites
  - †Asterophyllites charaeformis
  - †Asterophyllites grandis
  - †Asterophyllites longifolius
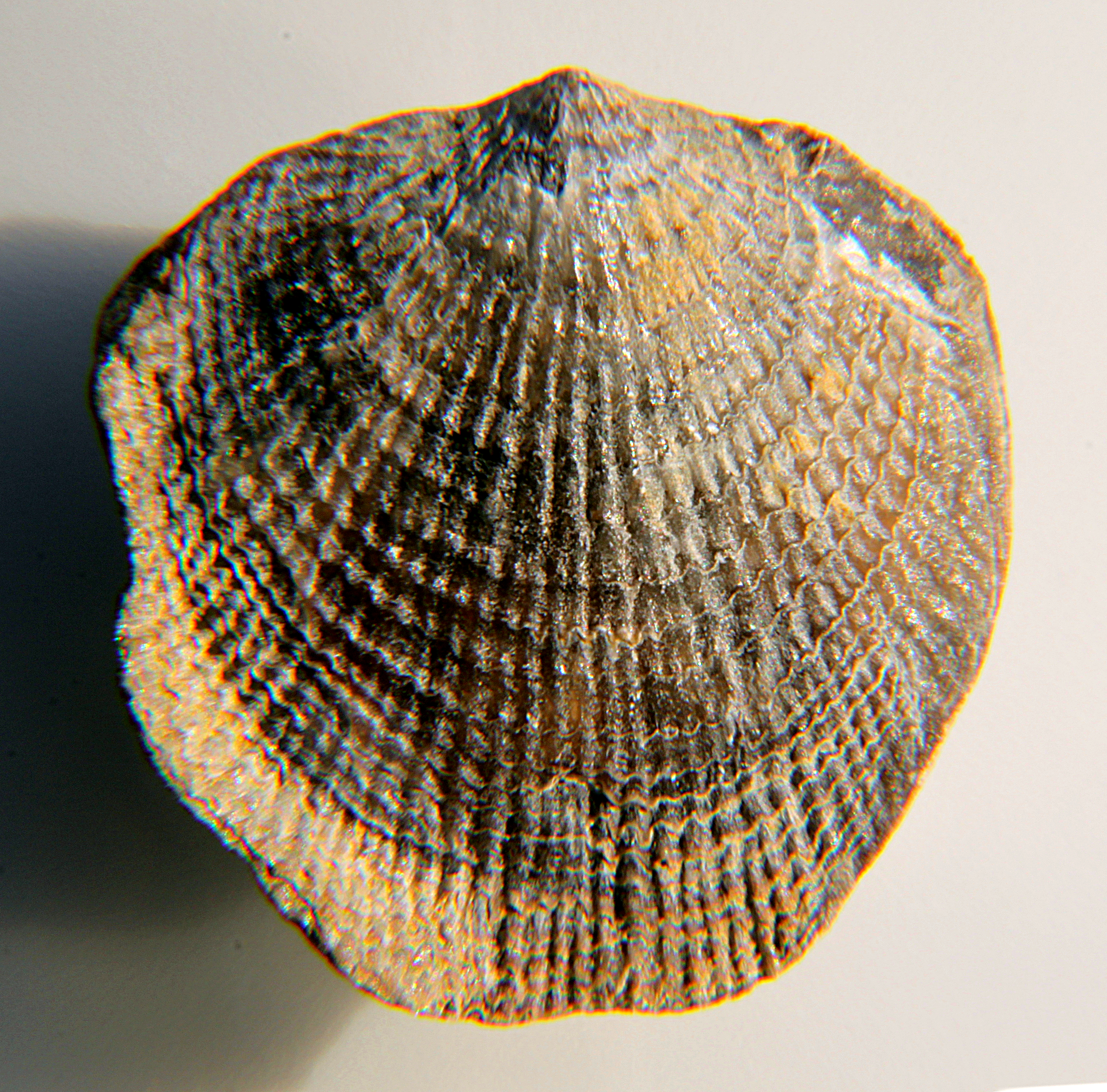
- Fossilized shell of the Late Ordovician-Carboniferous brachiopod Atrypa
  †Atrypa
- †Atrypina
- †Attenosaurus – type locality for genus
  - †Attenosaurus indistinctus – type locality for species
  - †Attenosaurus subulensis – type locality for species
- †Aviculopecten

== B ==
- †Bathytaptus – type locality for genus
  - †Bathytaptus falcipennis – type locality for species
- †Batocrinus
- †Batostoma
- †Beecheria
- †Belemnospongia
  - †Belemnospongia parmula – type locality for species
- †Bellimurina
  - †Bellimurina sulcata
- †Bimuria
  - †Bimuria buttsi – type locality for species
  - †Bimuria siphonata
- †Bipedes – type locality for genus
  - †Bipedes aspodon – type locality for species
- †Blountia
  - †Blountia bristolensis
- †Borestus
- †Buttsoceras
  - †Buttsoceras adamsi
  - †Buttsoceras odenvillense
  - †Buttsoceras vandiverense

== C ==
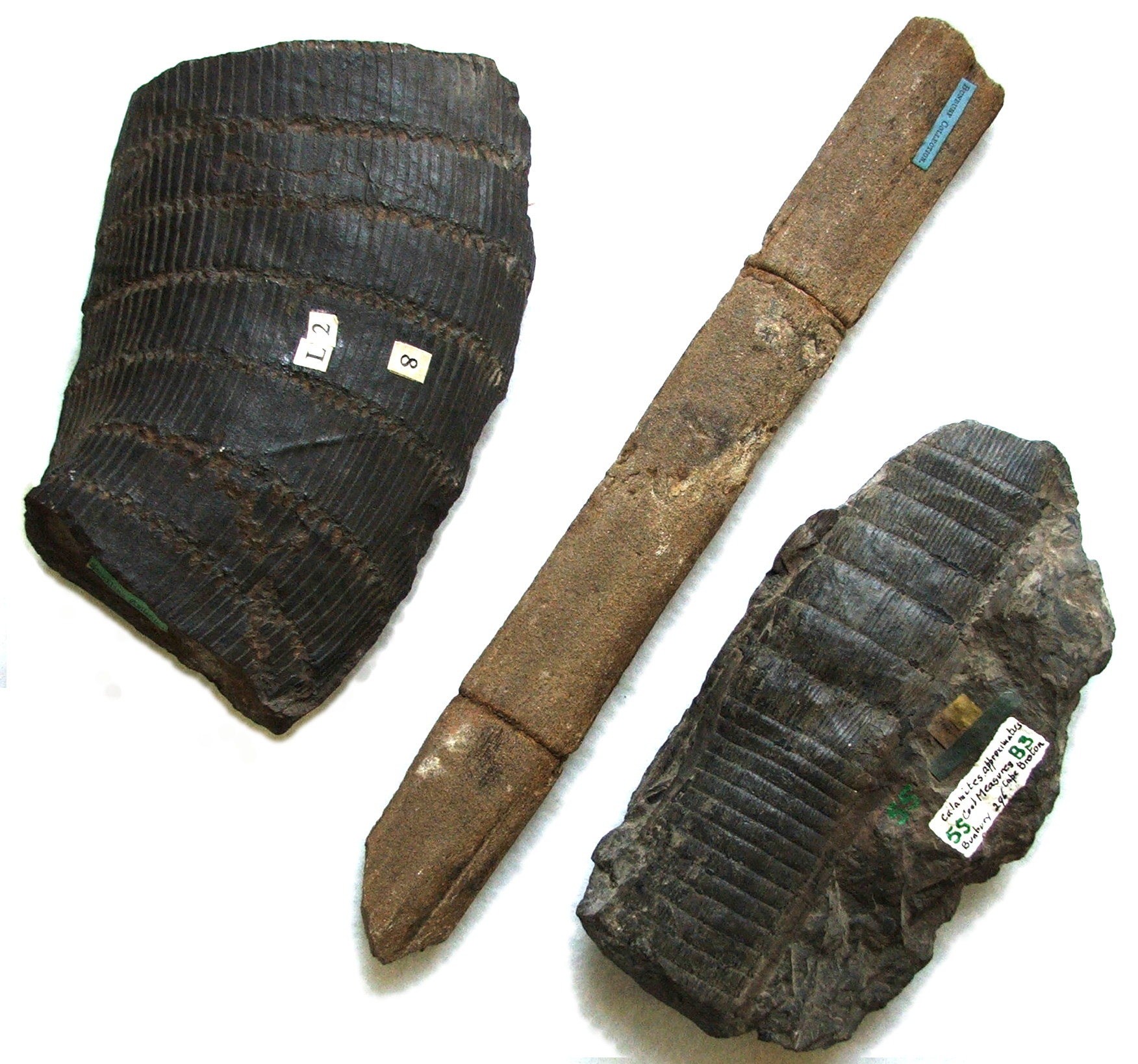
- Fossilized stems from the Carboniferous-Permian horsetail relative Calamites
  †Calamites
  - †Calamites cisti
  - †Calamites goepperti
  - †Calamites suckowi
  - †Calamites suckowii
  - †Calamites undulatus
- †Calamostachys
- †Campbelloceras
  - †Campbelloceras brevicameratum
- †Campteroneura – type locality for genus
  - †Campteroneura reticulata – type locality for species
- †Camptocrinus
  - †Camptocrinus columnals
- †Camptodiapha – type locality for genus
  - †Camptodiapha atkinsoni – type locality for species
- †Caninia
  - †Caninia flaccida
- †Carcharopsis
  - †Carcharopsis wortheni
- †Cardiopteridiuim
- †Cardiopteridium
- †Carinamala
- †Carpolithes
- †Catoraphiceras
  - †Catoraphiceras foersteri
- †Cavusgnathus
  - †Cavusgnathus unicornis
- †Cedaria
  - †Cedaria prolifica
- †Chirlotrypa
- †Christiania
  - †Christiania subquadrata
- †Cincosaurus – type locality for genus
  - †Cincosaurus cobbi – type locality for species
  - †Cincosaurus fisheri – type locality for species
  - †Cincosaurus jaggerensis – type locality for species
  - †Cincosaurus jonesii – type locality for species
- Fossilized tooth of the shark Cladodus
  †Cladodus – report made of unidentified related form or using admittedly obsolete nomenclature
  - †Cladodus newmani
- †Clathrospira
  - †Clathrospira euconica – type locality for species
- †Clathrospongia
  - †Clathrospongia bangorensis
- †Cleiothyridina
- †Cloudia – type locality for genus
  - †Cloudia buttsi – type locality for species
- †Cochlichnus
- †Coelconus
- †Coelocaulus
- †Coeloconus
- †Coelocrinus
- †Composita
  - †Composita subquadrata
- †Conocardium
- †Conotreta
  - †Conotreta apicalis
  - †Conotreta concentrica
  - †Conotreta multisinuata
- †Cordaicarpon
- †Cordaites
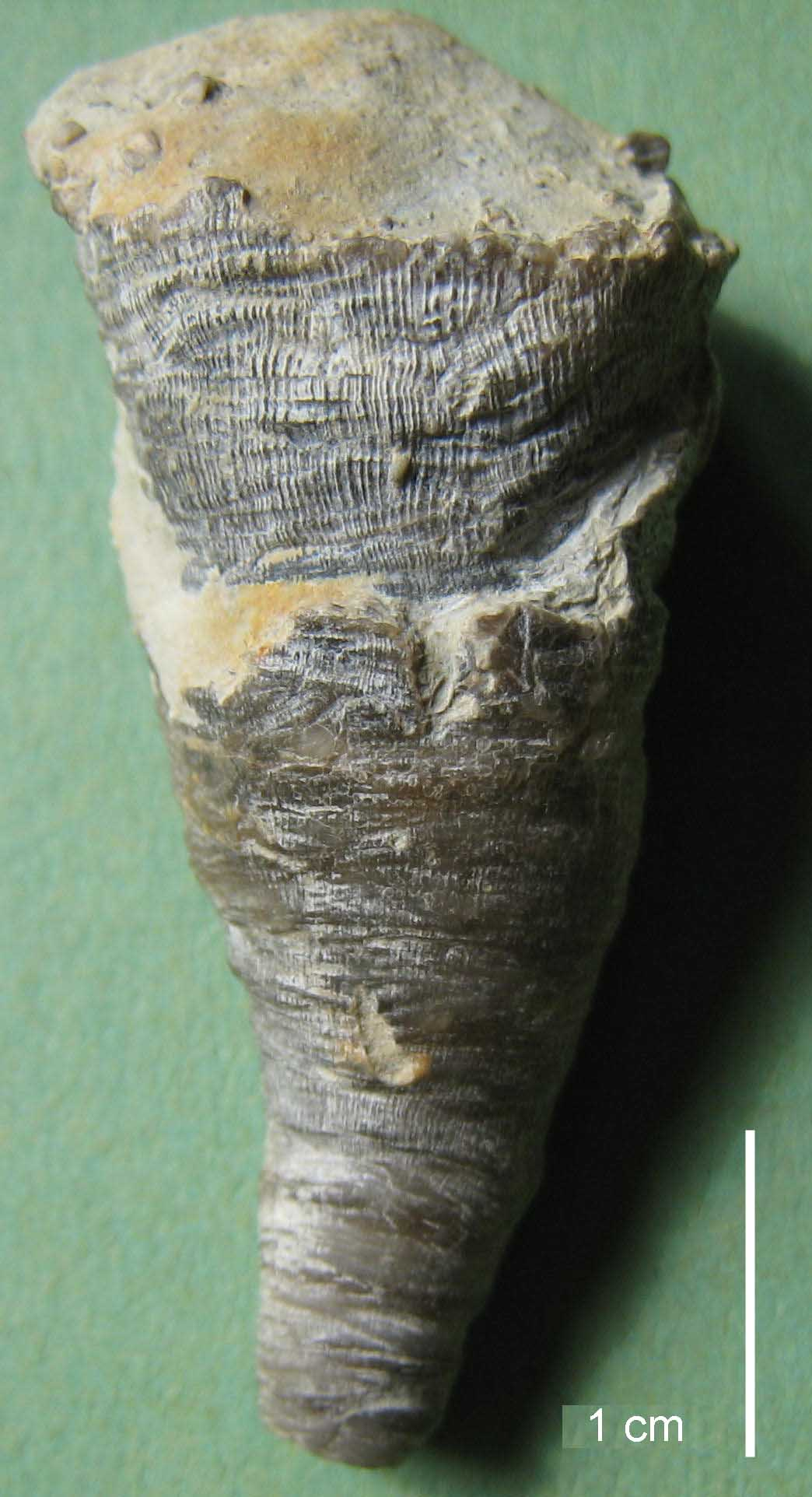
- Fossil of the Middle Ordovician-Carboniferous horn coral Cornulites
  †Cornulites
- †Crania
- †Craspedelia – type locality for genus
  - †Craspedelia marginata – type locality for species
- †Crepipora
- †Cryphiocrinus
- †Ctenacanthus
  - †Ctenacanthus elegans
- †Ctenerpeton
  - †Ctenerpeton primum – type locality for species
- †Cyclomyonia
  - †Cyclomyonia peculiaris
- †Cyclopteris
- †Cymbiocrinus
- †Cypricardella
- †Cyrtonotreta
  - †Cyrtonotreta depressa – type locality for species
- †Cystodictya

== D ==
- †Dalejina
- †Dasyporella
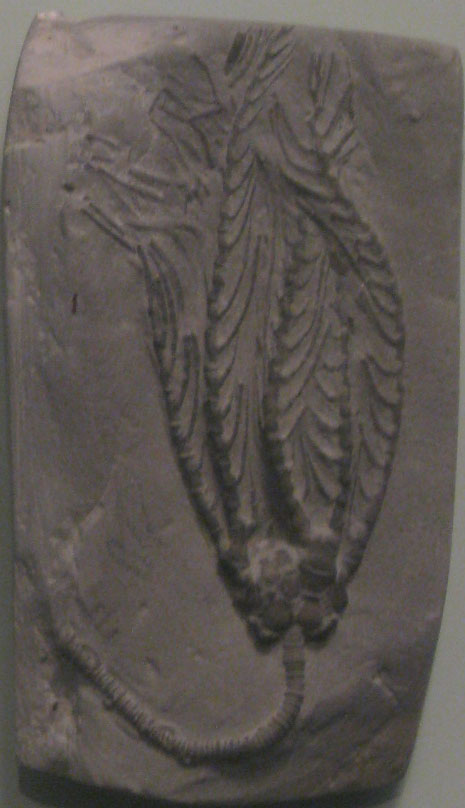
- Fossilized calyx of the Carboniferous crinoid ("sea lily") Decadocrinus
  †Decadocrinus
- †Deiracephalus
  - †Deiracephalus unicornis
- †Derbyia
- †Diaphragmus
- †Dichocrinus
- †Dicoelosia
- †Dictyonites
  - †Dictyonites perforata
- †Dictyospongia – tentative report
- †Dinotocrinus
- †Diorthelasma
  - †Diorthelasma parviim
- †Diplichnites
  - †Diplichnites gouldi
- †Diploblastus
- †Diplothmema
- †Diplotrypa
- †Discocystis
- †Dolorthoceras
- †Donalina – or unidentified comparable form
- †Dystactospongia

== E ==
- †Echinochonus
- †Echinoconchus
- †Elasmothyris
  - †Elasmothyris concimmla
- †Eliasopora
- †Elliptoglossa
  - †Elliptoglossa ovalis
- †Endocycloceras
  - †Endocycloceras perannulatum
- †Endothyra
  - †Endothyra excellens
- †Eoconospira
- †Eoconulus
  - †Eoconulus rectangulus
- †Eopteria
  - †Eopteria conocardiformis – type locality for species
  - †Eopteria richardsoni
- †Eostaffella
  - †Eostaffella paraendothyroidea
- †Eotrochus
- †Ephippelasma
  - †Ephippelasma minutum
- †Eremopteris
  - †Eremopteris rhodea
  - †Eremopteris rhodea type – informal
  - †Eremopteris rhodeatype – or unidentified comparable form
- †Eremotoechia
  - †Eremotoechia silicica
- †Eridopora
- †Euconospira
- †Eumetra
- †Eumetria
- †Eupachycrinus
- †Euphemites
- †Eurythmopteryx – type locality for genus
  - †Eurythmopteryx antiqua – type locality for species
- †Eusphenopteris
  - †Eusphenopteris lobata

== F ==
- †Fenestella
- †Fistulipora
- †Foerstephyllum

== G ==
- †Girtyella
- †Girvanella
- †Glossella
  - †Glossella papulosa
- †Glyptagnostus
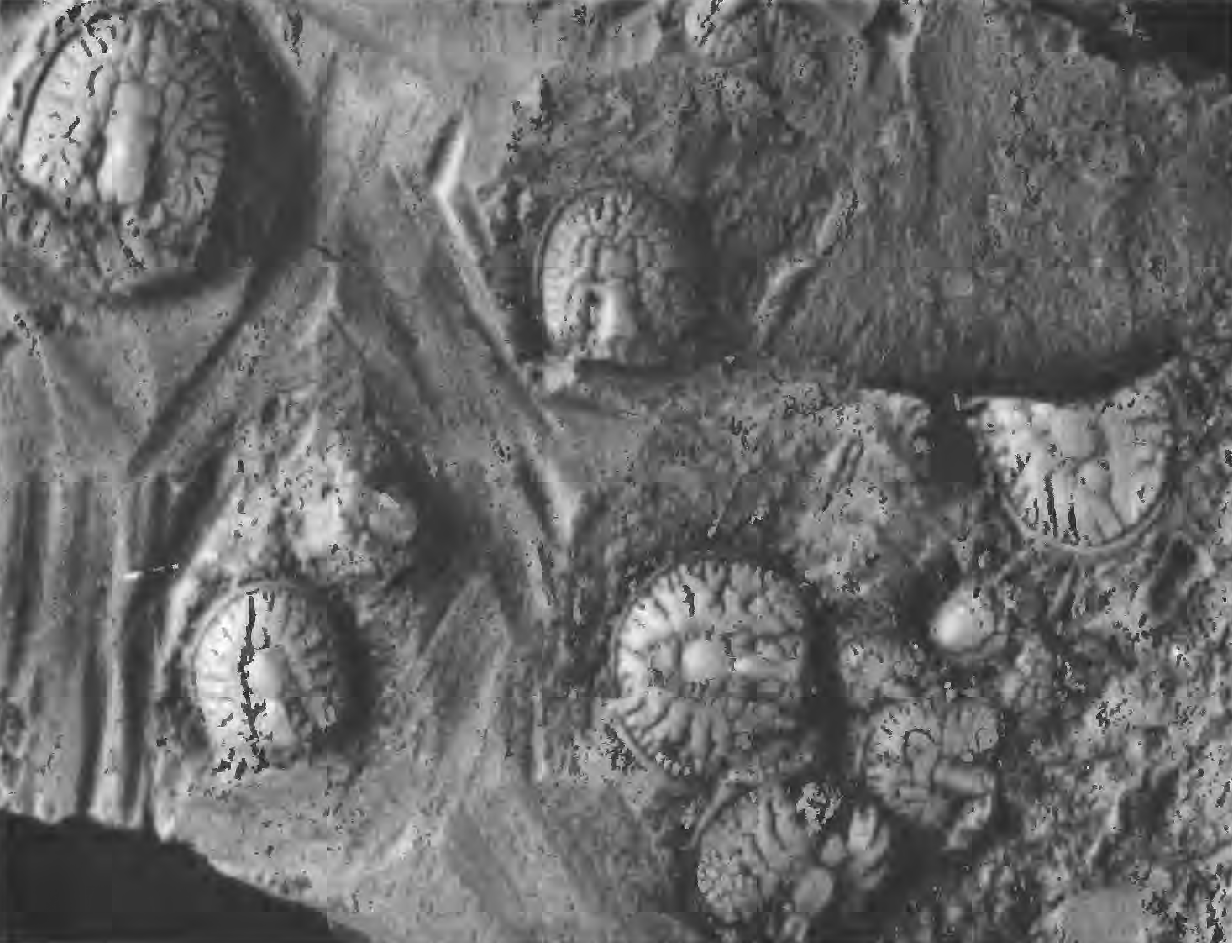
  - Assemblage of fossils of the Cambrian trilobite Glyptagnostus
    †Glyptagnostus reticulatus
  - †Glyptagnostus stolidotus
- †Glyptambonites
  - †Glyptambonites glyptus
- †Glyptopora
- †Glyptorthis
  - †Glyptorthis crispa – type locality for species
  - †Glyptorthis glypta
- †Gnathodus
  - †Gnathodus bilineatus

== H ==
- †Haplistion
  - †Haplistion armstrongi
- †Hedeina
- †Hederella
- †Hindeodus
  - †Hindeodus minutus
- †Holcospermum
- †Hustedia
  - †Hustedia miseri
- †Hydromeda – type locality for genus
  - †Hydromeda fimbriata – type locality for species

== I ==
- †Ianthinopsis
- †Inflatia
- †Innitagnostus
  - †Innitagnostus inexpectans
- †Isophragma
- †Isorthis

== K ==
- †Kingstonia
  - †Kingstonia appalachia
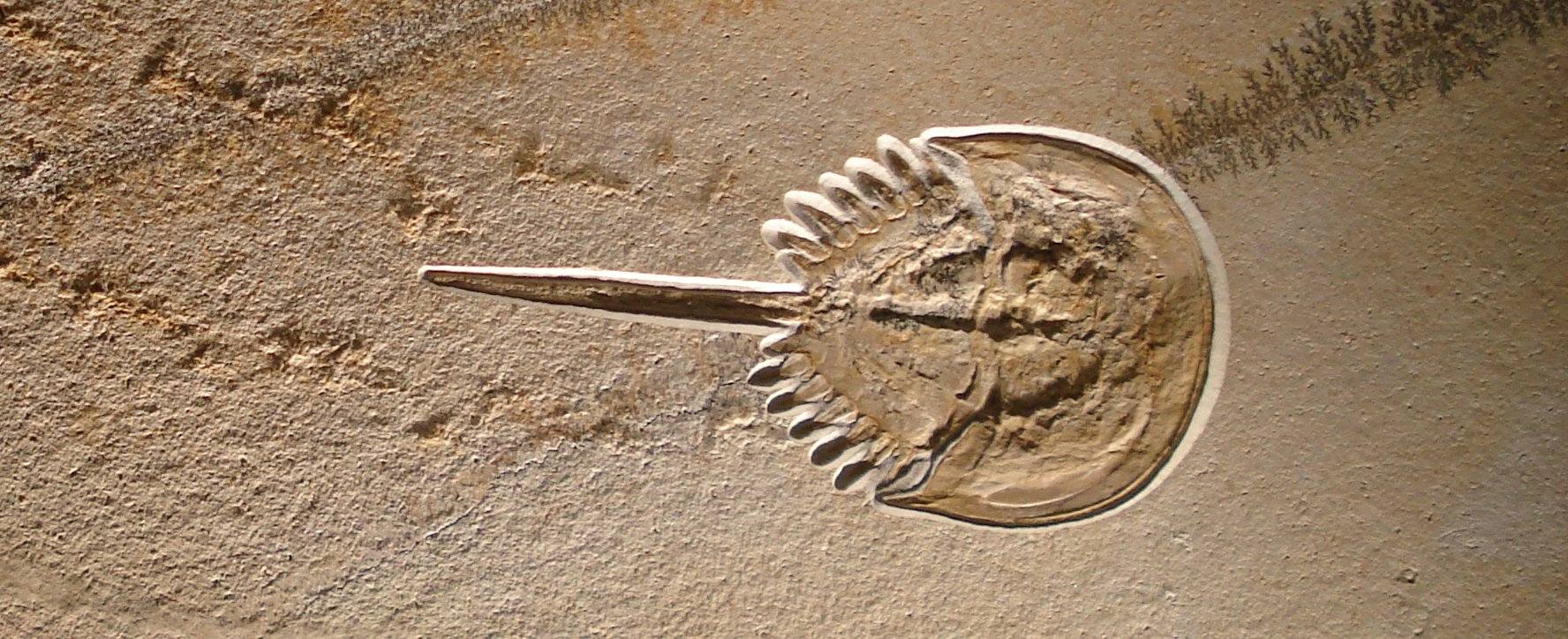
- Fossil of the Late Jurassic horseshoe crab Mesolimulus at the end of the trackway that it produced of the ichnogenus Kouphichnium
  †Kouphichnium
- †Kullervo
  - †Kullervo sulcata

== L ==
- †Labechiella – tentative report
- †Leangella
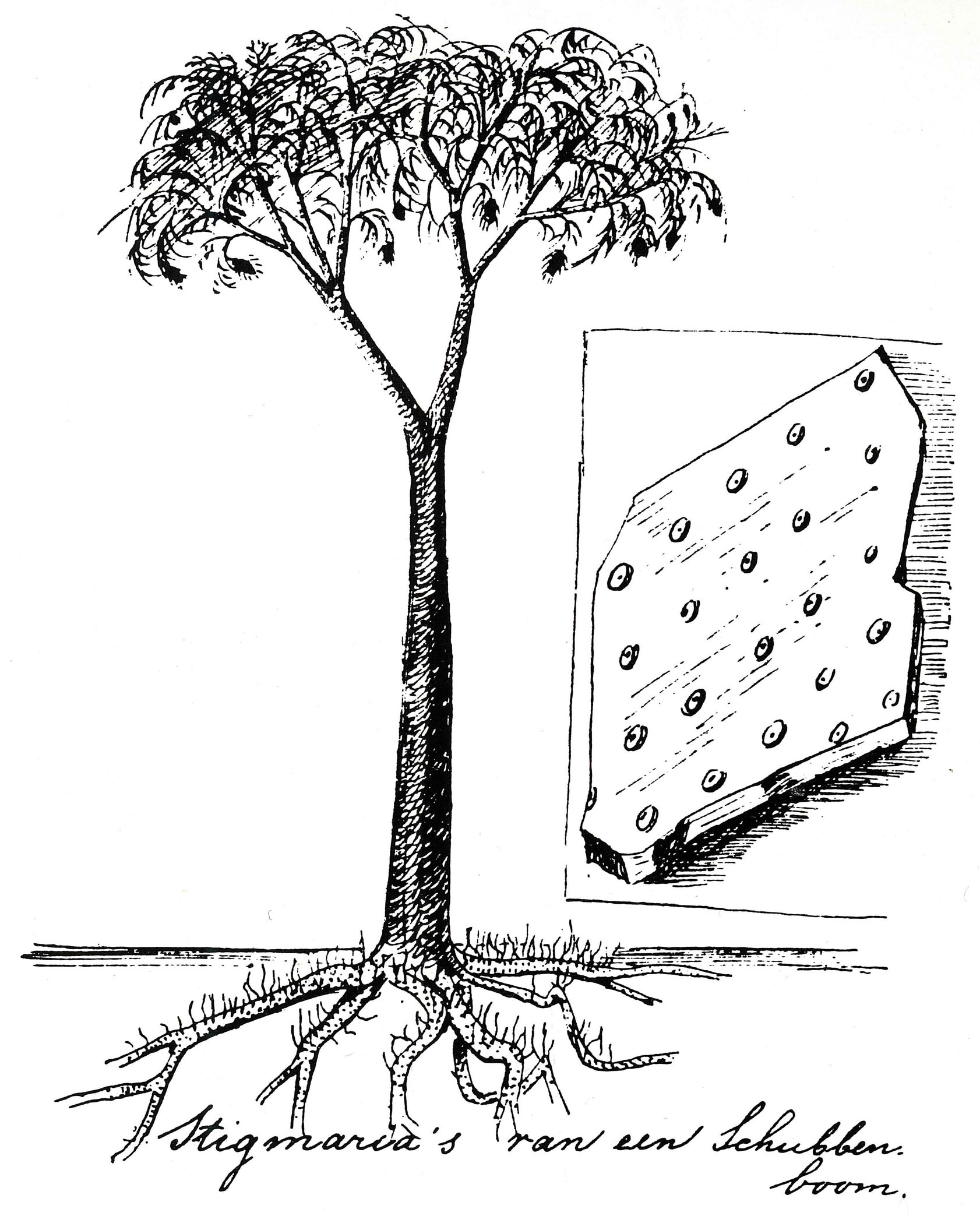
- Restoration of the Carboniferous-Late Triassic club moss relative Lepidodendron. Eli Heimans (1911).
  †Lepidodendron
  - †Lepidodendron aculeatum
  - †Lepidodendron obovatum
- †Lepidophloios
  - †Lepidophloios laricinus
- †Lepidophylloides
  - †Lepidophylloides intermedium
- †Lepidostrobophyllum
  - †Lepidostrobophyllum majus – or unidentified comparable form
- †Lepidostrobus
- †Leptoptygma
- †Limnosaurus – type locality for genus
  - †Limnosaurus alabamaensis – type locality for species
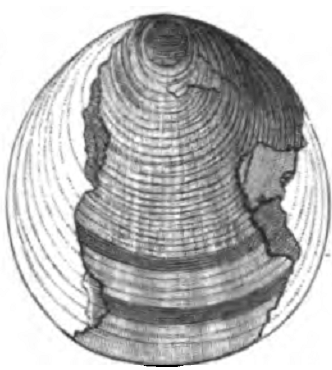
- Illustration of a fossilized shell of the Cambrian-Late Ordovician brachiopod Lingulella
  †Lingulella
  - †Lingulella alabamensis
  - †Lingulella lirata
  - †Lingulella pachyderma
- †Linocrinus
- †Lochriea
  - †Lochriea commutata
- †Lophospira
- †Lyginopteris
  - †Lyginopteris hoeninghausi
  - †Lyginopteris hoeninghausii
- †Lyropora

== M ==
- †Maclurites
- †Macrostachya
- †Matthewichnus
  - †Matthewichnus caudifer
- †Meekopora
- †Meekospira
- †Meristina – tentative report
- †Metacamarella
  - †Metacamarella pentagonum
- †Monogonoceras
  - †Monogonoceras alabamense
- †Mourlonia
- †Myeloxylon

== N ==
- †Nanopus
  - †Nanopus reidiae – type locality for species
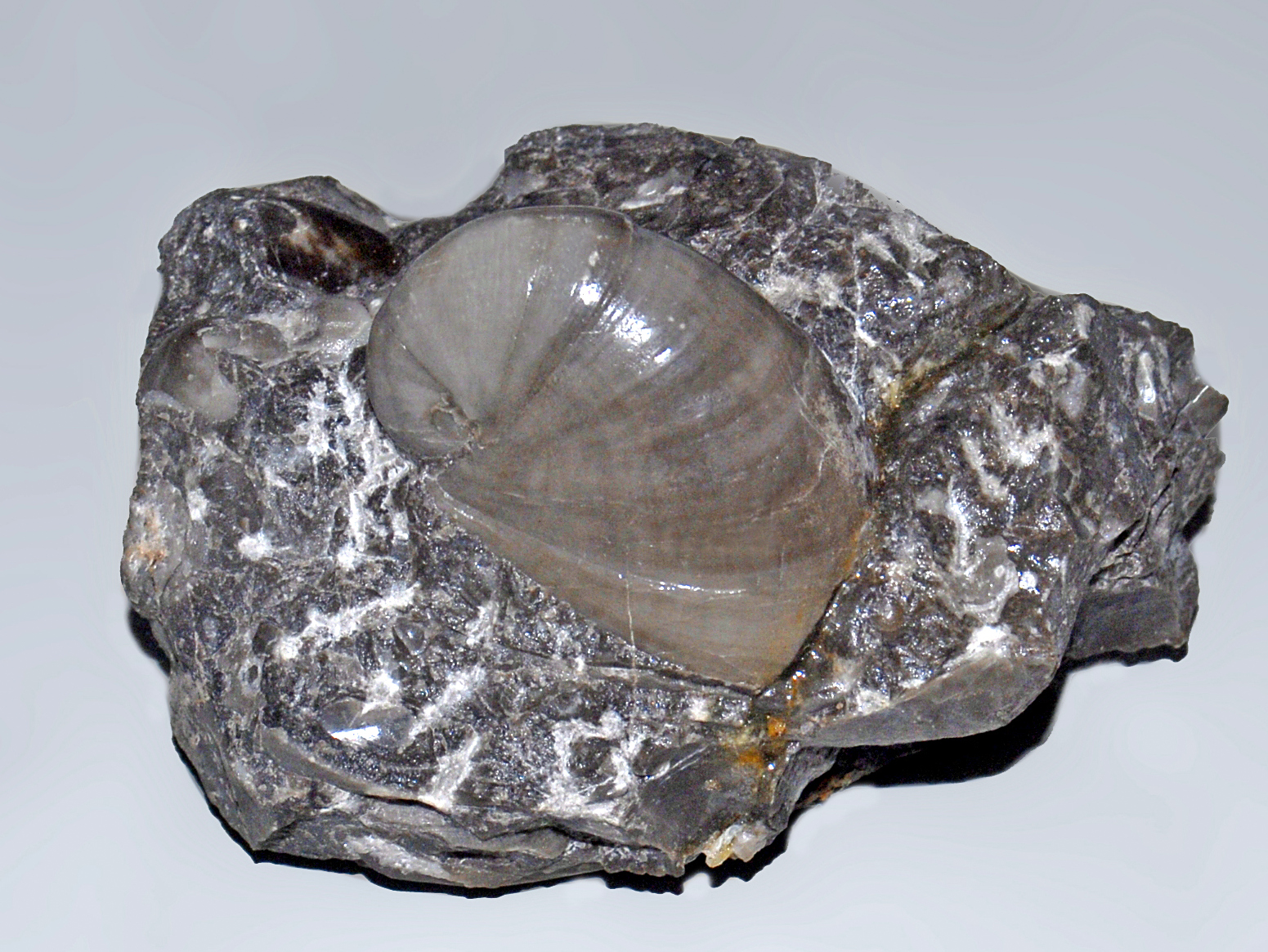
- Fossilized shell of the Early Devonian – Triassic sea snail Naticopsis
  †Naticopsis
- †Neilsonia
- †Neoarchaediscus
  - †Neoarchaediscus parvus
- †Neuralethopteris
  - †Neuralethopteris biformis
  - †Neuralethopteris elrodi
  - †Neuralethopteris pocahontas
  - †Neuralethopteris schlehani
  - †Neuralethopteris smithsii
- †Neuropteridium
- †Notalacerta
  - †Notalacerta missouriensis
- †Nothorthis
  - †Nothorthis tarda
  - †Nothorthis transversa
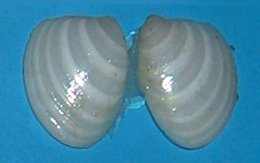
- Exterior of the shell of a modern specimen of the Early Ordovician-modern marine bivalve Nucula
  Nucula
- †Nuculopsis

== O ==
- †Obolus
- †Oligotypus
  - †Oligotypus tuscaloosae – type locality for species
- †Onychaster
- †Onychoceras
  - †Onychoceras australe
- †Opisthotreta
- †Orbiculoidea
- †Orthonychia
- †Orthotetes
- †Ovatia

== P ==
- †Pachyglossella – type locality for genus
  - †Pachyglossella dorsiconvexa – type locality for species
  - †Pachyglossella pachydermata
- †Pachystylostroma
- †Paladin
- †Palaeophycus
- †Paleostachya
- †Paleozygopleura
- †Palmatopteris
  - †Palmatopteris furcata
- †Paraconularia
- †Parastrophina
  - †Parastrophina bilobata
- †Patellilabia
- †Paterula
  - †Paterula perjecta
- †Paurorthis
  - †Paurorthis fasciculata
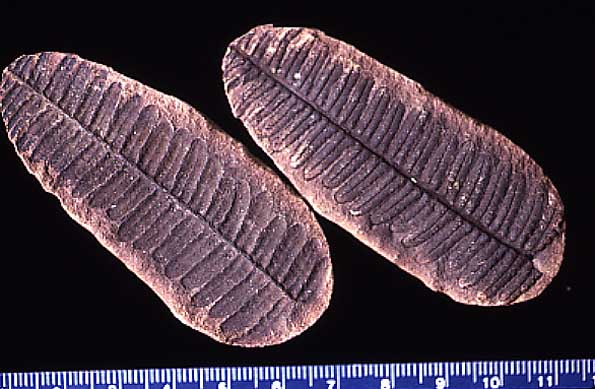
- Fossils of the Late Devonian-Permian fern-like fronds Pecopteris
  †Pecopteris
  - †Pecopteris arborescens
- †Penneritopora
- †Penniretopora
- †Pentremites
  - †Pentremites laminatus
  - †Pentremites tulipaformis
- †Perimecocoelia
  - †Perimecocoelia semicostata
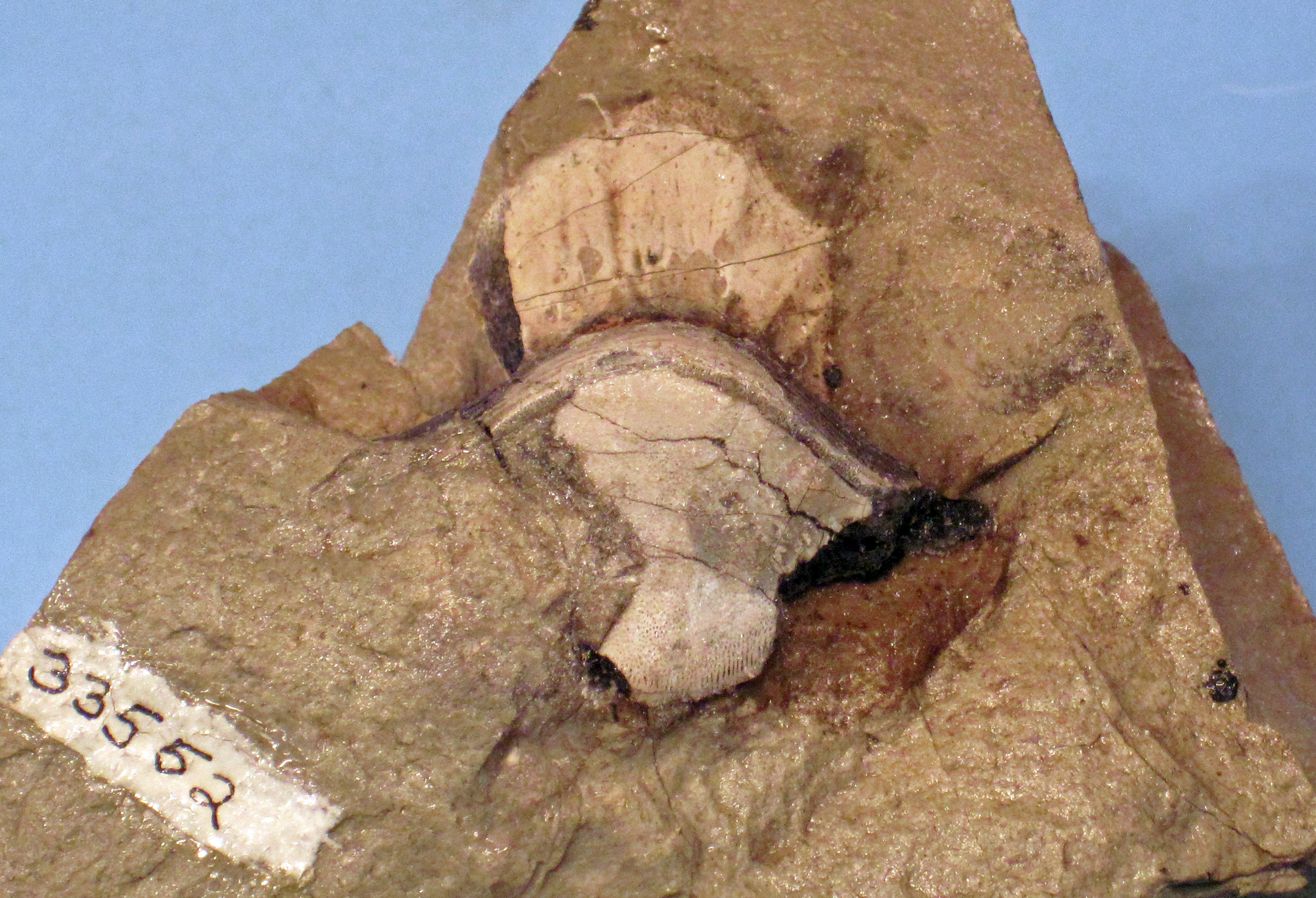
- Fossilized tooth of the Carboniferous-Permian shark Petalodus
  †Petalodus – tentative report
- †Phacelocrinus
- †Phanocrinus
- †Pharciphyzelus – type locality for genus
  - †Pharciphyzelus lacefieldi – type locality for species
- †Phestia
- †Phosphanulus
- †Phragmodictya
  - †Phragmodictya rugosa – type locality for species
- †Phragmorthis
  - †Phragmorthis biittsi
- †Pileospongia – type locality for genus
  - †Pileospongia lopados – type locality for species
- †Pinnularia
- †Platyceras
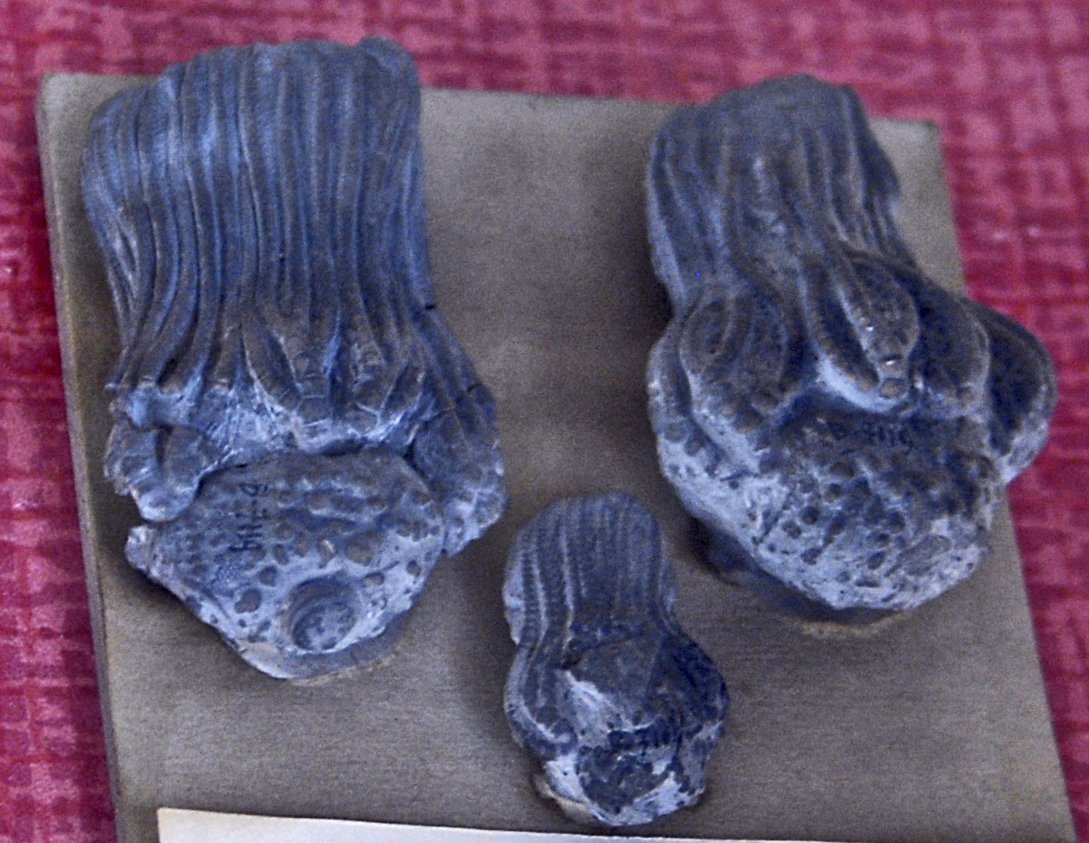
- Three fossilized calyces of the Devonian-Permian crinoid ("sea lily") Platycrinites
  †Platycrinites
- †Platyzona
- †Pojetaconcha
  - †Pojetaconcha alabamensis – type locality for species
- †Polypora
- †Prismapora
- †Prismopora
- †Prismpora
- †Proagnostus
- †Protocycloceras
  - †Protocycloceras odenvillense
- †Protoniella
- †Protovirgularia
- †Psammodus
- †Pseudagnostus
  - †Pseudagnostus contracta
- †Pseudomonotis
- †Pterocrinus
- †Pterotocrinus
- †Ptychoglyptus
  - †Ptychoglyptus virginiensis
- †Ptychopleurella
- †Ptylopora
- †Punctospirifer

== Q ==
- †Quadropedia – type locality for genus
  - †Quadropedia prima – type locality for species
- †Quasiarcgaediscus
  - †Quasiarcgaediscus clausiluminus – or unidentified comparable form

== R ==
- †Rachis
- †Ramulocrinus
- †Raphistoma
  - †Raphistoma pelhamensis – type locality for species
- †Reticularia (protist)
- †Reticulariina
- †Reticycloceras
- †Rhabdomeson
- †Rhabomeson
- †Rhipidomella
- †Rhombopora
- †Rhopocrinus
- †Rhynchospirina – tentative report
- †Rhysotreta
  - †Rhysotreta corrugata

== S ==
- †Saivodus – report made of unidentified related form or using admittedly obsolete nomenclature
  - †Saivodus striatus
- †Scaphelasma
  - †Scaphelasma septatum
- †Scheillwinella
- †Schellwienella
- †Schizambon
- †Schizodus
- †Schizopea – type locality for genus
  - †Schizopea washburnei – type locality for species
- †Schizotreta
  - †Schizotreta corrugata
  - †Schizotreta subconica
  - †Schizotreta willardi
- †Selenichnites
- †Septimyalina
- †Septopora
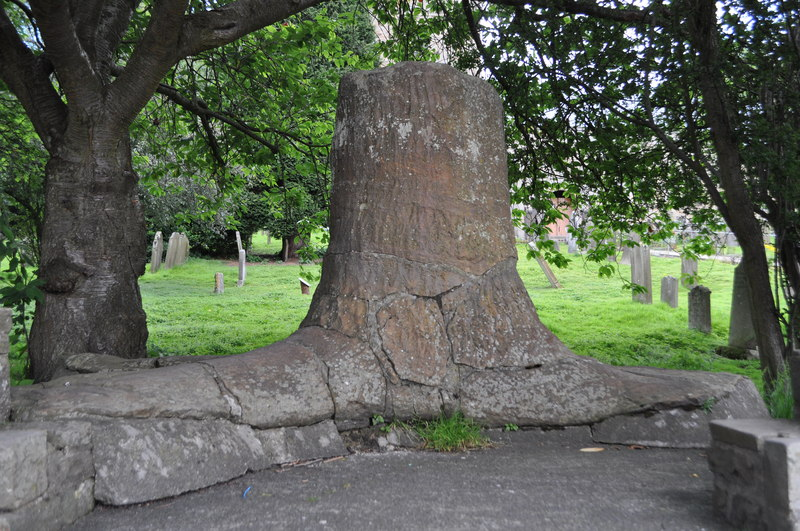
- Fossilized stump of the Carboniferous-Permian club moss relative Sigillaria
  †Sigillaria
  - †Sigillaria elegans
  - †Sigillaria ichthyolepis
  - †Sigillaria scutella
  - †Sigillaria scutellata
- †Sivorthis
  - †Sivorthis tenuicostatus
- †Skenidioides
  - †Skenidioides convexus
- †Solenopora
- †Spenopteris
  - †Spenopteris pseudocristata
- †Sphaeriella – type locality for genus
  - †Sphaeriella radiata – type locality for species
- †Sphenophyllum
  - †Sphenophyllum cuneifolium
  - †Sphenophyllum emarginatum
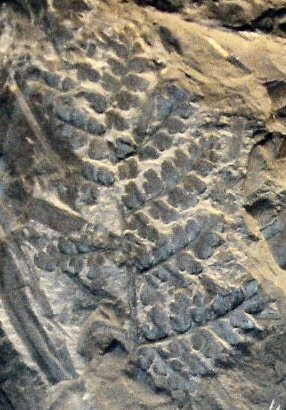
- Fossilized foliage of the Late-Devonian-Cretaceous seed fern Sphenopteris
  †Sphenopteris
  - †Sphenopteris brongniarti
  - †Sphenopteris elegans
  - †Sphenopteris herbacea
  - †Sphenopteris pottsvillea
  - †Sphenopteris pseudocristata
  - †Sphenopteris schatzlarensis
- †Spinilingula
  - †Spinilingula intralamellata
- Spirorbis
- †Spondylotreta
  - †Spondylotreta concentrica
- †Stegocoelia
- †Straparollus
- †Streblochondria
- †Streblotrypa
- †Strophostylus
- †Syringodendron

== T ==
- †Tabuliopora
- †Tabulipora
- †Talasotreta
  - †Talasotreta gigantea
- †Taphrorthis
  - †Taphrorthis peculiaris
- †Teiichispira
  - †Teiichispira odenvillensis
- †Tetranota
  - †Tetranota obsoleta – or unidentified comparable form
- †Thamniscus
- †Thamnodictya – tentative report
  - †Thamnodictya radiata
- †Thanmiscus
- †Titanambonites
  - †Titanambonites amplus
- †Torynelasma
  - †Torynelasma minor
  - †Torynelasma torynijeriim
- †Torynifer
- †Trematis
  - †Trematis elliptopora
  - †Trematis spinosa
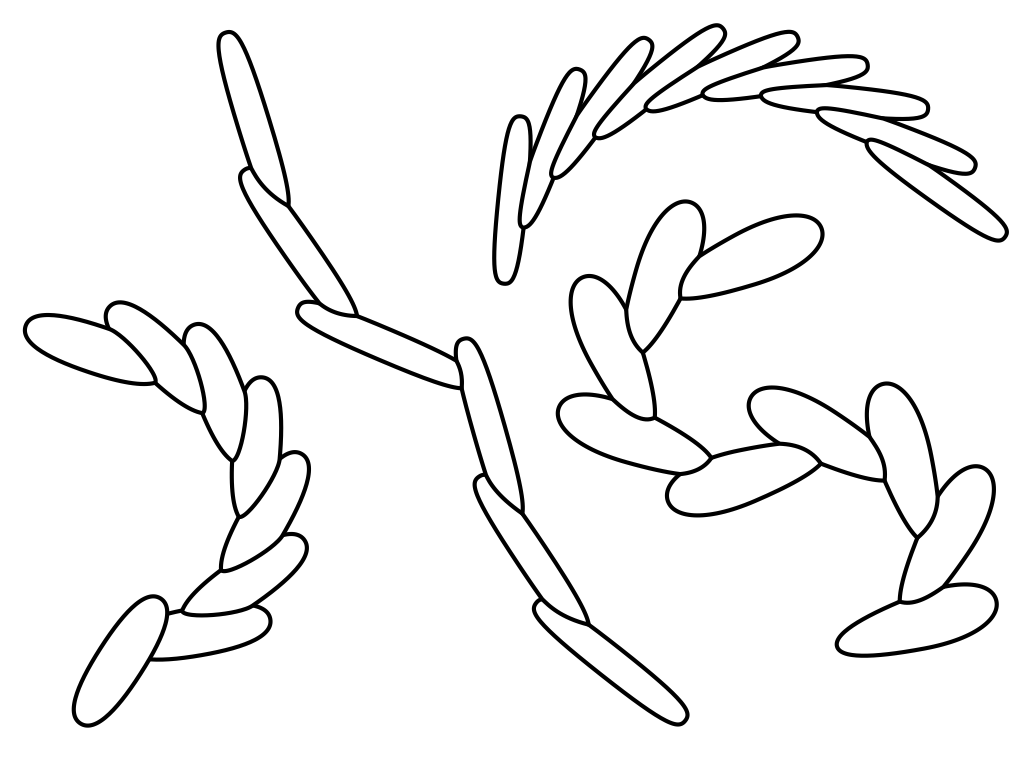
- Illustration in side view of several fossils of the Cambrian burrow ichnogenus Treptichnus
  †Treptichnus
  - †Treptichnus apsorum – type locality for species
- †Trigonocarpus
  - †Trigonocarpus ampulliforme
- †Triplesia
  - †Triplesia carinata
- †Trisaurus – type locality for genus
  - †Trisaurus lachrymus – type locality for species
- †Tropidothyris
  - †Tropidothyris pentagona

== U ==
- †Ulodendron
  - †Ulodendron majus
- †Undichna
- †Undiferina
  - †Undiferina rugosa

== V ==
- †Vermiporella

== W ==
- †Westonia
  - †Westonia superba
- †Wewokella
  - †Wewokella costata
- †Whittleseya
  - †Whittleseya elegans

== X ==
- †Xenambonites – type locality for genus
  - †Xenambonites undosus – type locality for species

== Z ==
- †Zaphrentoides
- †Zygospira – tentative report
  - †Zygospira matutina – type locality for species
