= Hale Formation =

Geologic formation in northern Arkansas

- Stratigraphic range: Pennsylvanian
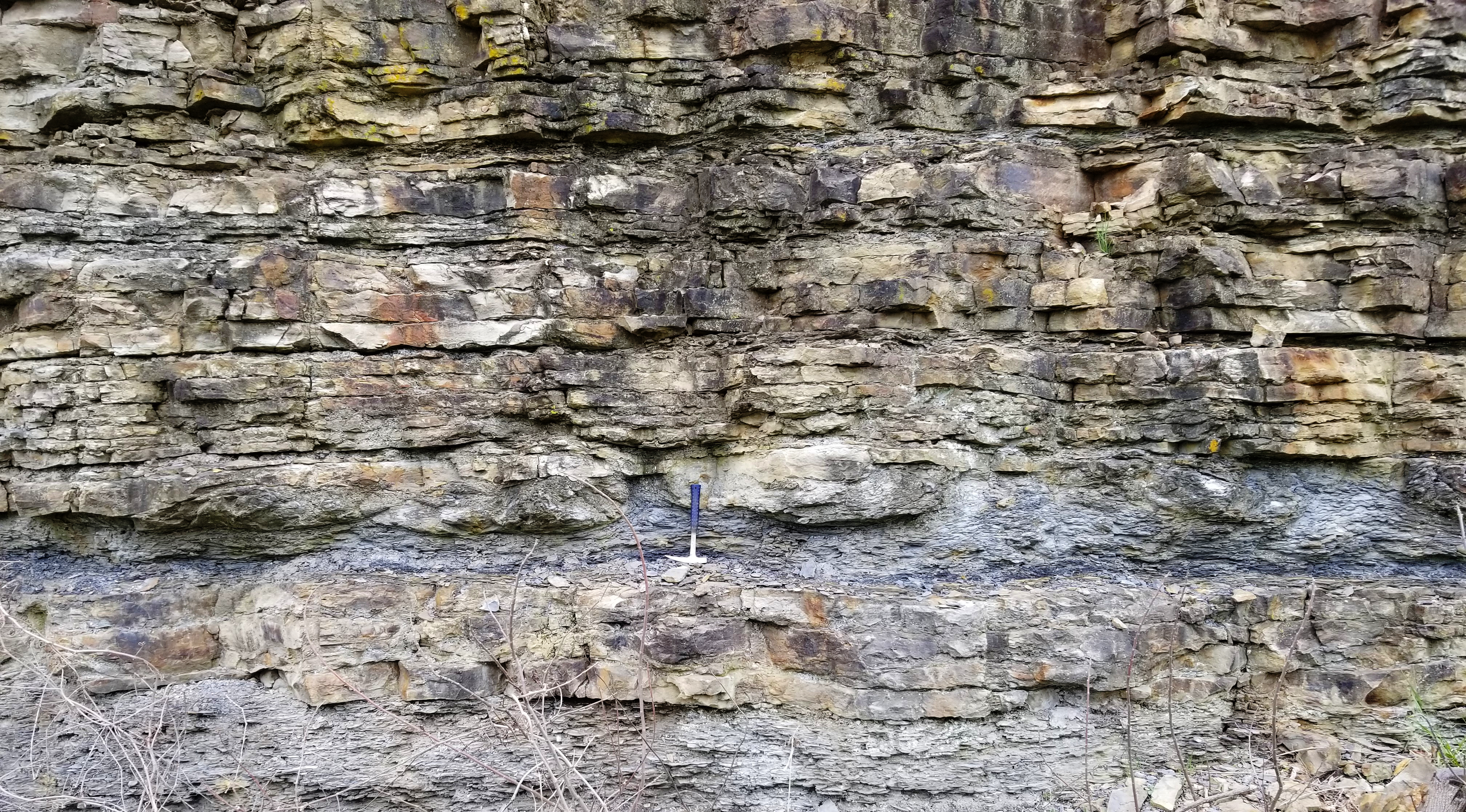
- Outcrop of the Cane Hill Member of the Hale Formation
- Type: Formation
- Unit of: none
- Sub-units: Cane Hill Member, Prairie Grove Member
- Underlies: Bloyd Formation
- Overlies: Pitkin Formation
- Thickness: few feet to over 300 feet

Lithology
- Primary: Limestone, Sandstone
- Other: Conglomerate, Shale

Location
- Region: Arkansas, Kansas
- Country: United States

Type section
- Named for: Hale Mountain, Washington County, Arkansas
- Named by: J.A. Taff

The Hale Formation is a geologic formation in northern Arkansas that dates to the Morrowan Series of the early Pennsylvanian. The Hale Formation has two named members: the Cane Hill and the Prairie Grove Members. The lower member is the Cane Hill, a primarily sandstone and shale interval that unconformably overlies the Mississippian-age Pitkin Formation. The upper member, the Prairie Grove Member, is predominately limestone and conformably underlies the Bloyd Formation.

== Nomenclature ==
Named by J. A. Taff in 1905, the Hale Formation was originally called the "Hale sandstone lentil" of the Morrow Formation after Hale Mountain in Washington County, Arkansas. In the same year, George I. Adams and E. O. Ulrich called it the "Hale sandstone member" of the Morrow Formation. In 1907, Albert Homer Purdue raised the rank to the Hale Formation of the Morrow Group, however, the Morrow Group was later abandoned as a stratigraphic unit in 1961. A stratotype was not designated by J. A. Taff and, as of 2017, no reference section has been designated.

The Cane Hill Member was named after the town of Cane Hill in Washington County, Arkansas in 1953 by Lloyd G. Henbest, who also named its upper member, the Prairie Grove Member, after the town of Prairie Grove, in Washington County, Arkansas. Henbest did not designate a stratotype for either of these members, and as of 2017, neither of them have been designated a reference section.

In the eastern parts of the Ozarks in Arkansas, the Hale Formation becomes undifferentiated with the overlying Bloyd Formation and is called the Witts Springs Formation.

== Paleontology ==
=== Blastoids ===
- Pentremites
  P. angustus
  P. rusticus

=== Brachiopods ===
- Anthracospirifer
- Antiquatonia
- Beecheria
- Cleiothyridina
- Composita
- Desmoinesia
- Echinaria
- Hustedia
- Krotovia
- Leptagonia
- Linoproductus
- Neochonetes
- Phricodothyris
- Punctospirifer
- Schizophoria
- Plicochonetes
- Rhipidomella
- Rhynchopora
- Sandia
- Schizophoria
- Spiriferellina
- Tesuquea
  T. morrowensis
- Zia

=== Bryozoans ===
- Fenestella morrowensis
  F. venusta
- Fistulipora matheri
- Matheropora triseriata
- Polypora anastomosa
  P. constricta
  P. halensis
  P. magna
  P. purduei
  P. reversispina
  P. triseriata
  P. washingtonensis
- Phyllopora perforata
- Septopora crebripora
- Sulcoretepora brentwoodensis
  S. sinuomarginata

=== Cephalopods ===
- Arkanites relictus
- Bactrites redactus
  B. gaitherensis
- Baschkirites
  B. librovitchi
- Bisatoceras secundum
- Branneroceras branneri
- Cancelloceras huntsvillense
- Cymoceras cracens
- Dinocycloceras prolixum
- Endolobus
- Ephippioceras ferratum
- Glaphyrites morrowensis
- Gordonites matheri
  G. filifer
- Homoceratoides cracens
- Hudsonoceras moorei
- Knightoceras oxylobatum
  K. palatum
- Paradimorphoceras
- Proshumardites morrowanus
- Pseudopronorites quinni
  P. arkansiensis
- Pseudorthoceras knoxense
- Quinnites henbetsi
  Q. textum
- Ramosites
- Reticuloceras wainwrighti
  R. tiro
  R. semiretia
- Retites semiretia
- Schartymites paynei
- Syngastrioceras globosum
  S. oblatum
- Verneuilites pygmaeus
- Wiedeyoceras matheri

=== Conodonts ===
- Gondolella
  G. clarki
- Idiognathodus
  I. klapperi
  I. sinuosus
- Idiognathoides
  I. convexus
  I. sinuatus
- Neognathodus
  N. bassleri
  N. symmetricus
- Rhachistognathus
  R. primus

=== Crinoids ===
- Arkacrinus
- Eirmocrinus
- Palmerocrinus

=== Flora ===
- Archaeolithophyllum
  A. missouiense
- Asphaltina
  A. cordillerensis
- Eflugelia
- Girvanella
- Stacheoides
  S. spissa

=== Foraminifera ===
- Asteroarchaediscus
  A. rugosus
- Biseriella
- Climacammina
  C. antiqua
- Diplosphaerina
  D. inaequalis
- Earlandia
- Endothyra
- Eosigmoinina
  E. rugosa
- Eostaffella
  E. pinguis
- Hemiarchaediscus
- Millerella
  M. marblensis
  M. pressa
- Neoarchaediscus
- Paleonubecularia
- Paramillerella
  P. pinuis
- Planoendothyra
- Plectogyra
  P. tantala
- Pseudoglomospira
- Tetrataxis
  T. maxima
- Tubertina
  T. plana
- Turrispoiroides
  T. multivolutus

=== Ostracods ===
- Glyptopleua
  G. whitei
- Healdia
- Kirkbyella (Berdanella)
- Knightina
- Shivaella

=== Trace Fossils ===
- Gastrochaenolites anauchen
- Trypanites

=== Incertae sedis ===
- Clacisphaera
  C. laevis
- Proninella
  P. strigosa

== See also ==
- List of fossiliferous stratigraphic units in Arkansas
- Paleontology in Arkansas
