= Pitkin Formation =

Geologic formation in Arkansas, United States

- Stratigraphic range: Upper Visean-Serpukhovian
- Type: Formation
- Sub-units: Imo Shale
- Underlies: Hale Formation
- Overlies: Fayetteville Formation
- Thickness: up to and over 400 feet

Lithology
- Primary: Limestone
- Other: Shale

Location
- Region: Arkansas
- Country: United States

Type section
- Named for: Pitkin post office, Washington County, Arkansas
- Named by: George Irving Adams and Edward Oscar Ulrich

The Pitkin Formation, or Pitkin Limestone, is a fossiliferous geologic formation in northern Arkansas that dates to the Chesterian Series of the late Mississippian. This formation was first named the "Archimedes Limestone" by David Dale Owen in 1858, but was replaced in 1904. The Pitkin conformably overlies the Fayetteville Shale and unconformably underlies the Pennsylvanian-age Hale Formation. Some workers have considered the shales at the top of the Pitkin Formation to be a separate formation called the Imo Formation. More recently, others have considered the Imo to be informal member of the Pitkin Formation.

== Paleofauna ==
Early work aimed at creating a comprehensive list for all fossils found in the Pitkin Formation was done by Easton in 1943. Unless otherwise stated, all species below can be found in his 'Fauna of the Pitkin Formation.'

=== Foraminifera ===
- Archaediscus

A. stilus

- Asteroarchaediscus

A. rugosus

- Earlandia
- Endothyra

E. kleina
E. phrissa

- Endothyranella
- Eosigmoilina

E. explicata
E. rugosa

- Eostaffella
- Eotuberitina
- Monotaxinoides
- Neoarchaediscus
- Nodosarchaediscus
- Paramillerella
- Planospirodiscus
- Plectogyra
- Priscella
- Pseudoammodiscus

P. priscus

- Pseudoglomospira
- Tetrataxis

T. corona

- Trepeilopsis
- Zellerina

Z. designata
Z. discoidea

=== Porifera, Sponges ===
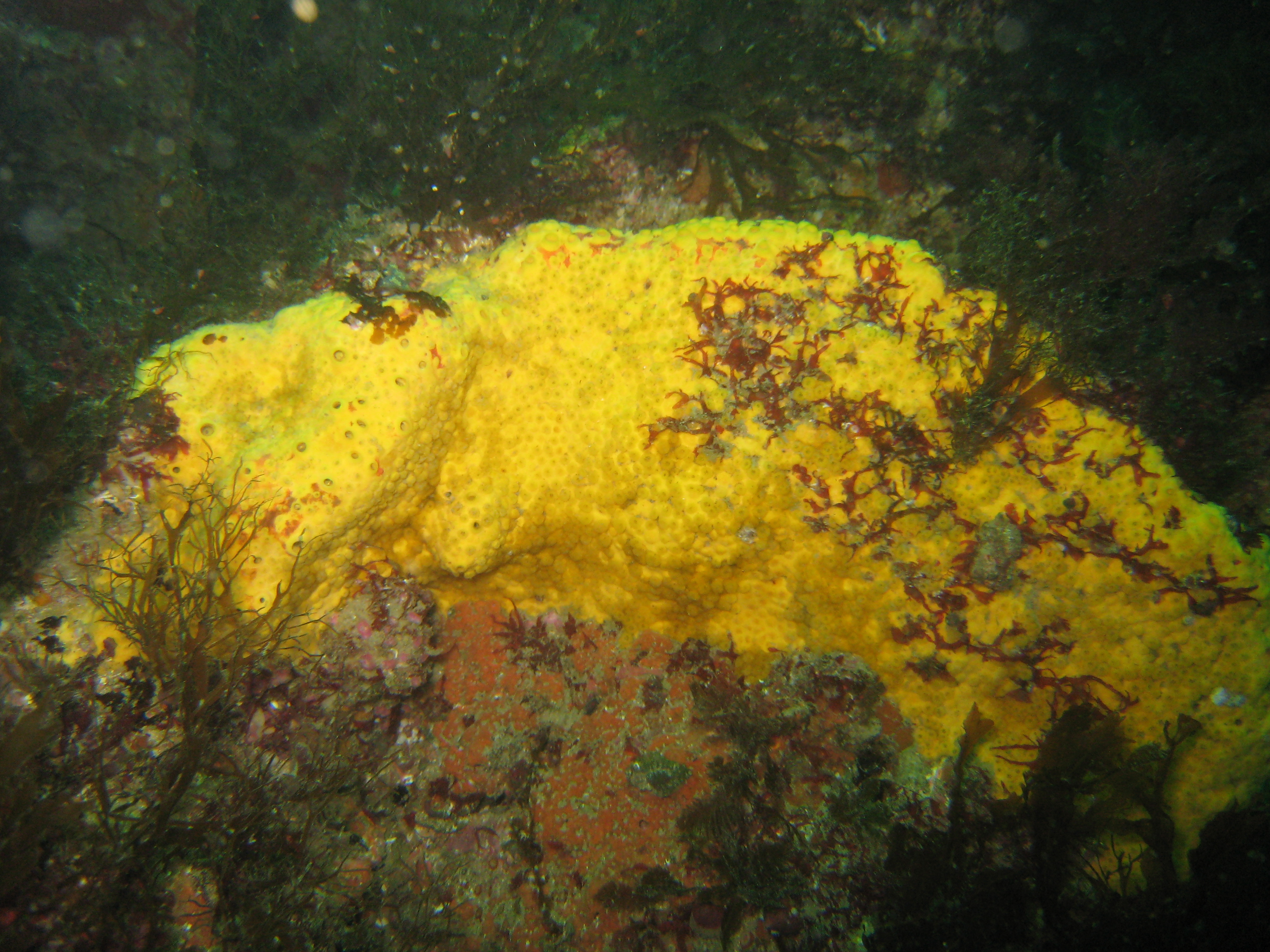
A modern Cliona from the coastal waters of northern France.

- Cliona

=== Scyphozoa ===
- Conularia Originally considered to be a gastropod.

=== Anthozoa, Corals ===
- Amplexus
- Aulopora

A. gracilis

- Caninostrotion

C. variablilis

- Kinkaidia
- Lesliella
- Leonardophyllum
- Lonsdaleia

L. major
L. minor

- Michellinia

M. macerimuris

- Parvaxon
- Pleurodictyum

P. eugenei
P. meekanum

- Syringopora
- Triplophyllum
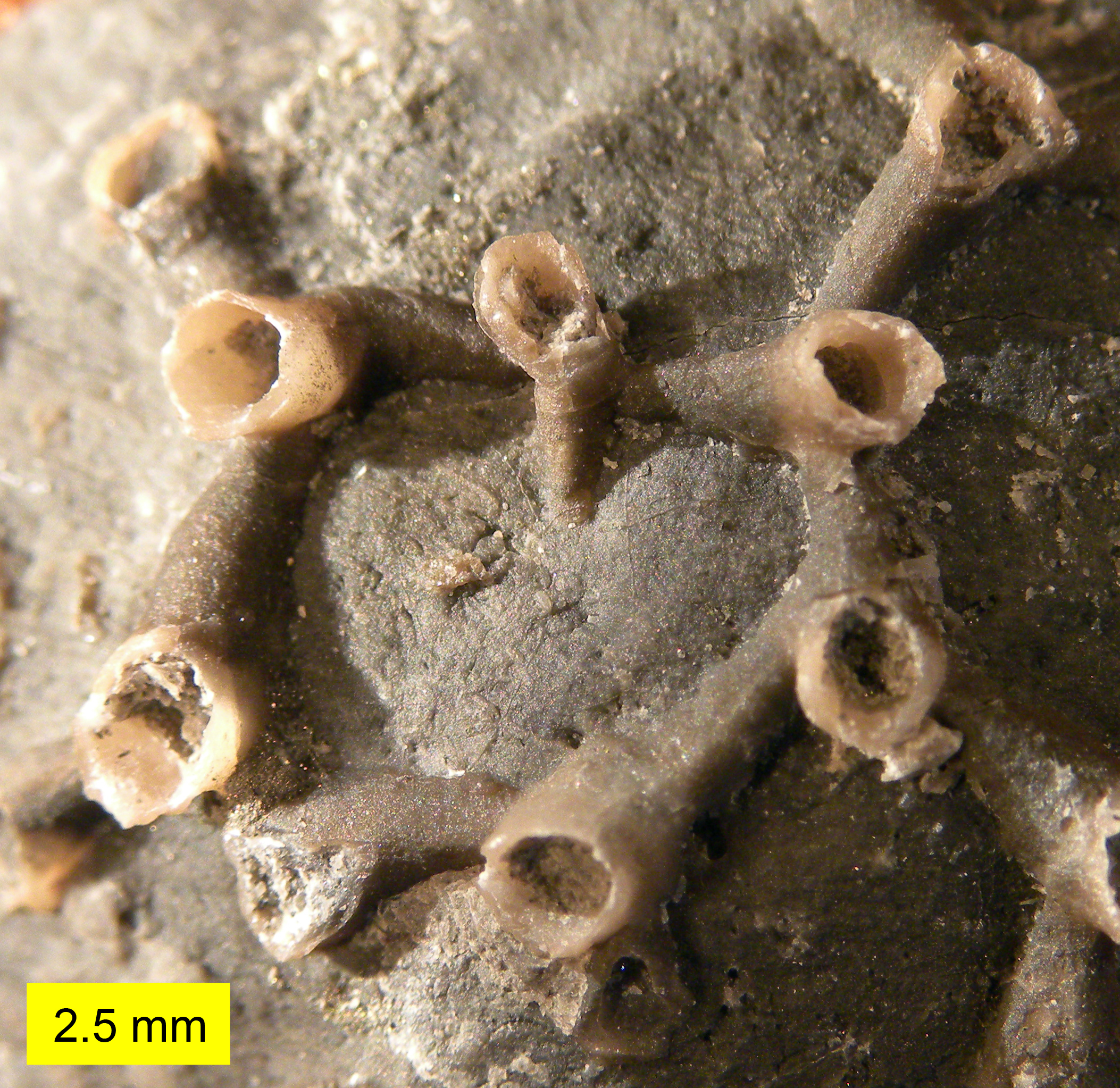
Aulopora from the Silica Formation of Ohio.

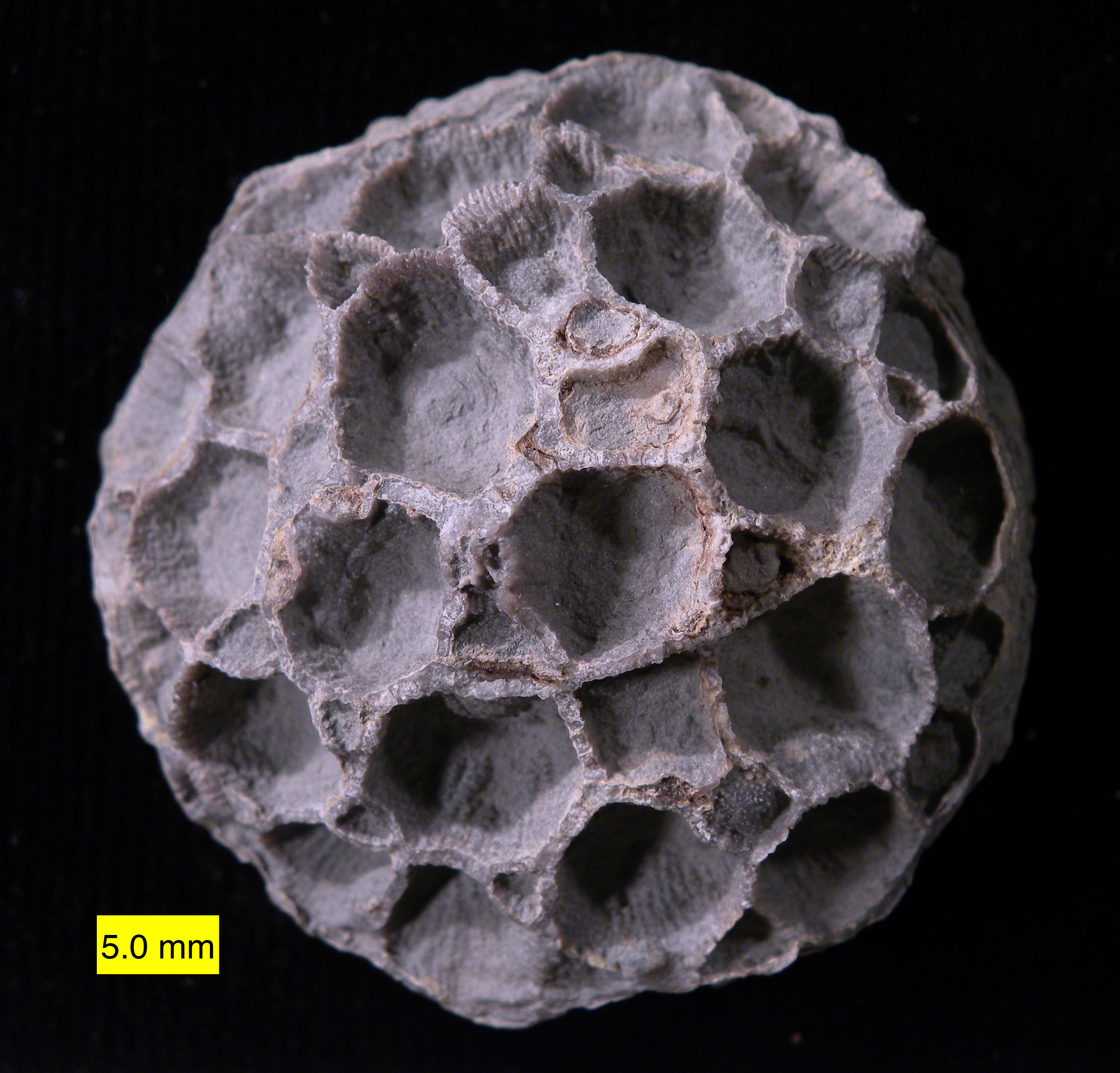
Pleurodictyum americanum from the Givetian Kashong Shale (Hamilton Group) of Livingston County, New York.

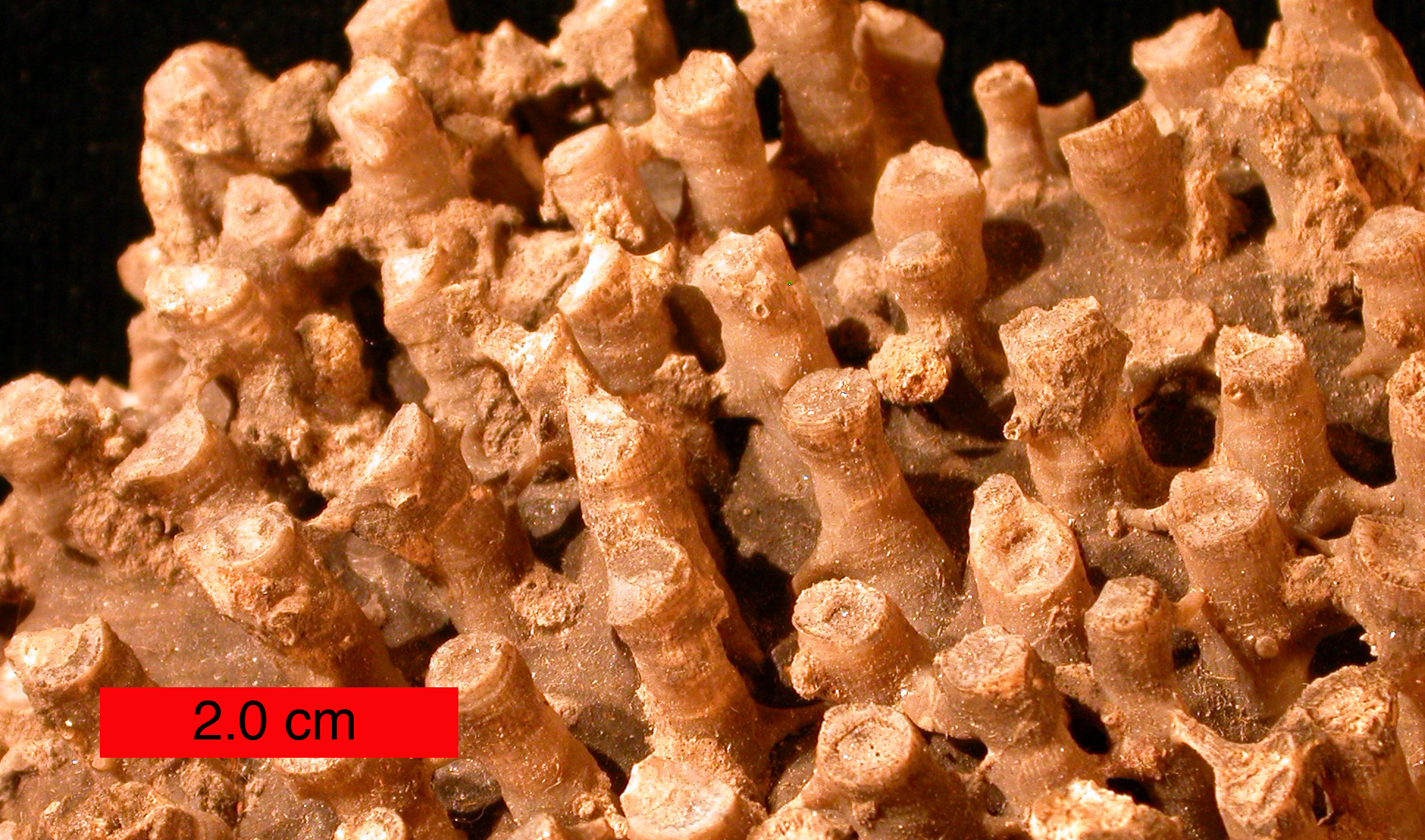
Syringopora from the Boone Formation of Arkansas.

=== Blastoidea ===
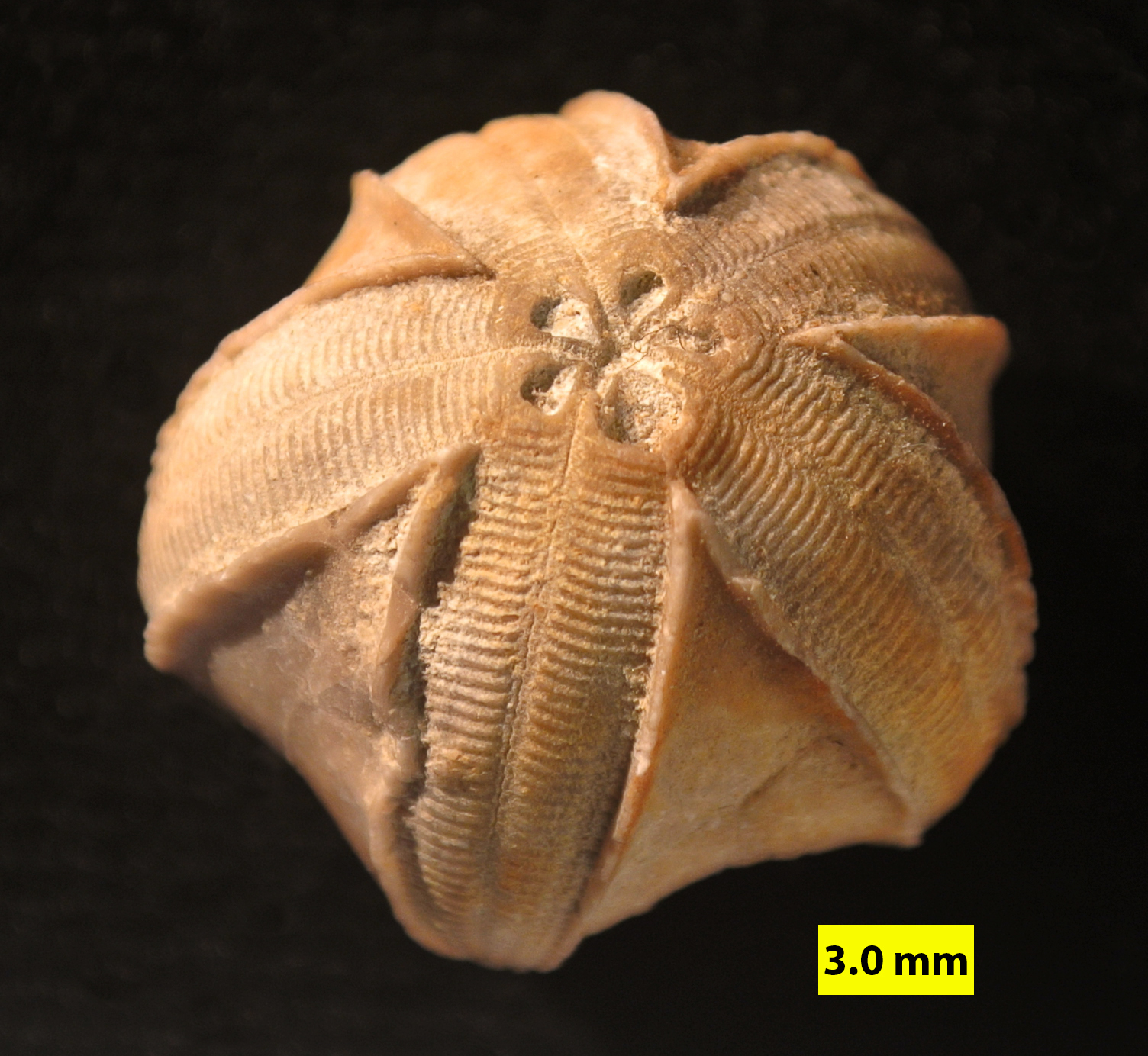
Pentremites godoni from the Lower Carboniferous of Illinois.

- Pentremites

P. elongatus
P. godoni
P. laminatus
P. obesus
P. platybasis

=== Crinoidea, Sea Lilies ===
- Agassizocrinus (see unidentified section)

A. patulus

- Aphelecrinus

A. planus

- Bronaughocrinus

B. figuratus

- Camptocrinus
- Carinocrinus

C. stevensi

- Castillocrinus
- Catillocrinus
- Cosmetocrinus

C. eventus

- Cromyocrinus
- Culmicrinus
- Cyathocrinus
- Delocrinus
- Dichocrinus
- Hydreionocrinus
- Linocrinus

L. floweri

- Onychocrinus

O. pulaskiensis

- Pachylocrinus
- Paianocrinus

P. aptus
P. durus

- Paracymbiocrinus

P. pitkini

- Pelecocrinus

P. stereostoma

- Pentaramicrinus

P. modulus

- Phacelocrinus
- Phanocrinus

P. cooksoni
P. irregularis

- Poteriocrinus
- Pterotocrinus

P. tridecibrachiatus

- Scytalocrinus (see unidentified section)

S. braggsi
S. dunlapi
S. garfieldi

- Taxocrinus

T. whitfieldi

- Telikosocrinus

T. caespes
T. residuus

- Zeusocrinus

Z. foveatus

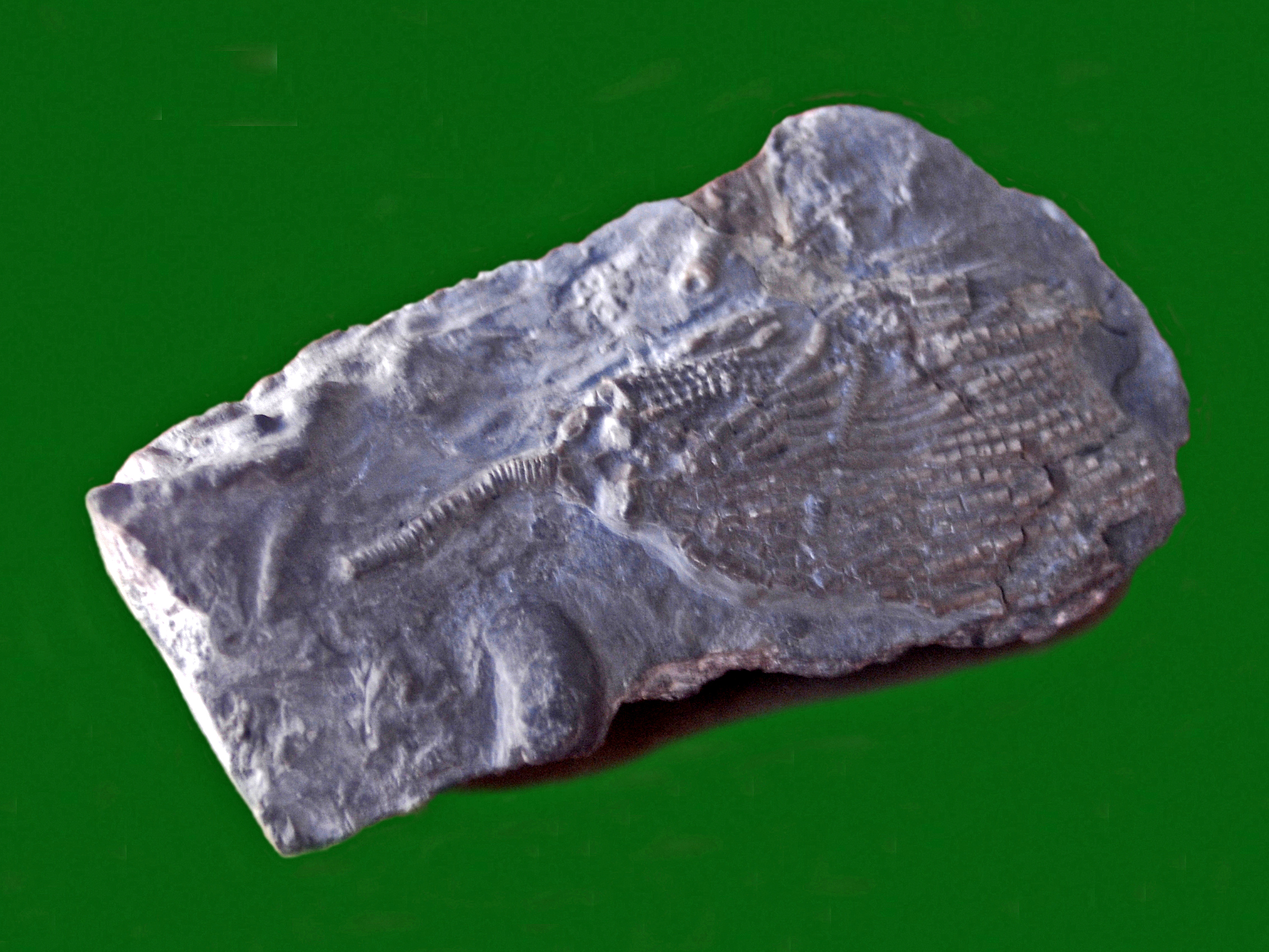
Cyathocrinus goniodactylus, on display at Galerie de paléontologie et d'anatomie comparée in Paris.

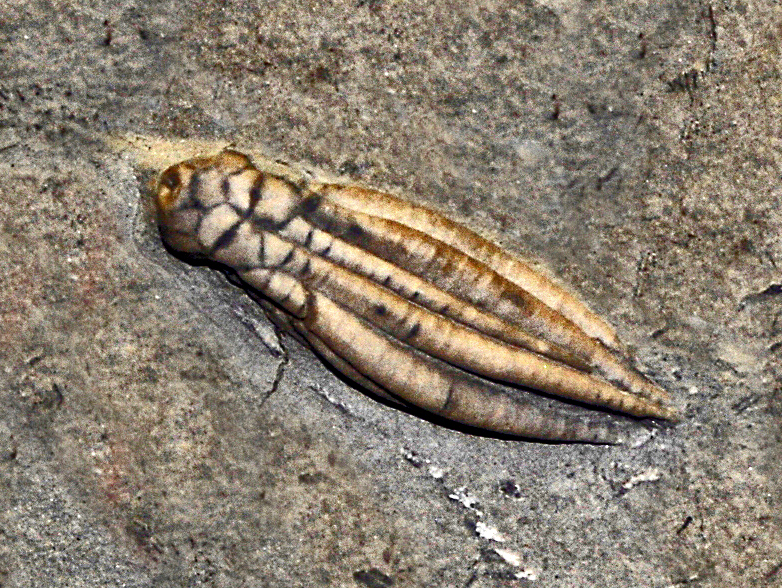
Fossil of Scytalocrinus from Carboniferous of the United States

=== Ophiuroidea, Brittle Stars ===
This group was originally place under Stelleroidia in early studies.

- Aganaster

A. singulatus

- Schoenaster

=== Echinoidea, Sea Urchins ===
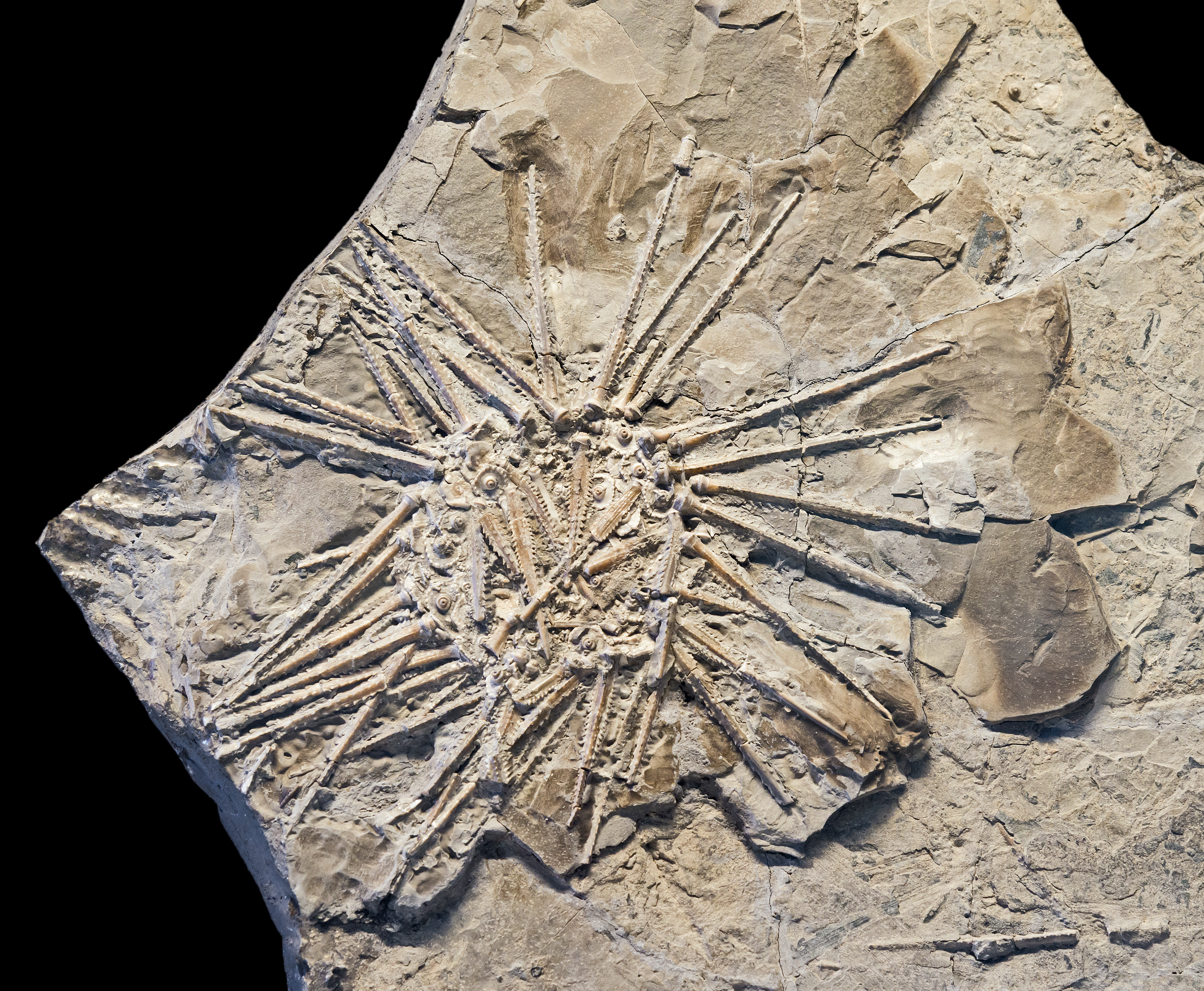
An upper Carboniferous species of Archaeocidaris.

- Archaeocidaris

=== Worms ===
Previous studies have grouped these diverse animals into a single, obsolete taxon: Vermes.

- Spirorbis

=== Bryozoa, "Moss-animals" ===
Stereo image
Left frame
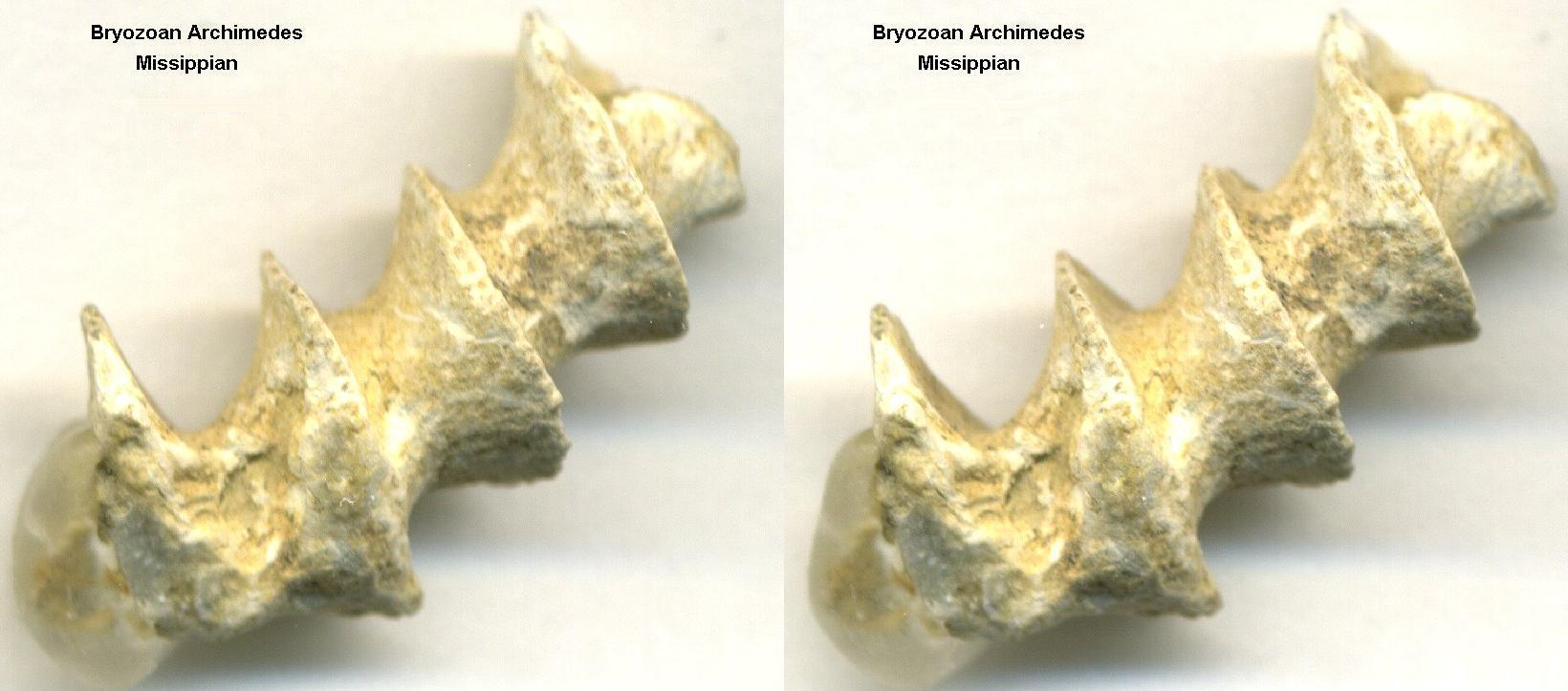
Right frame
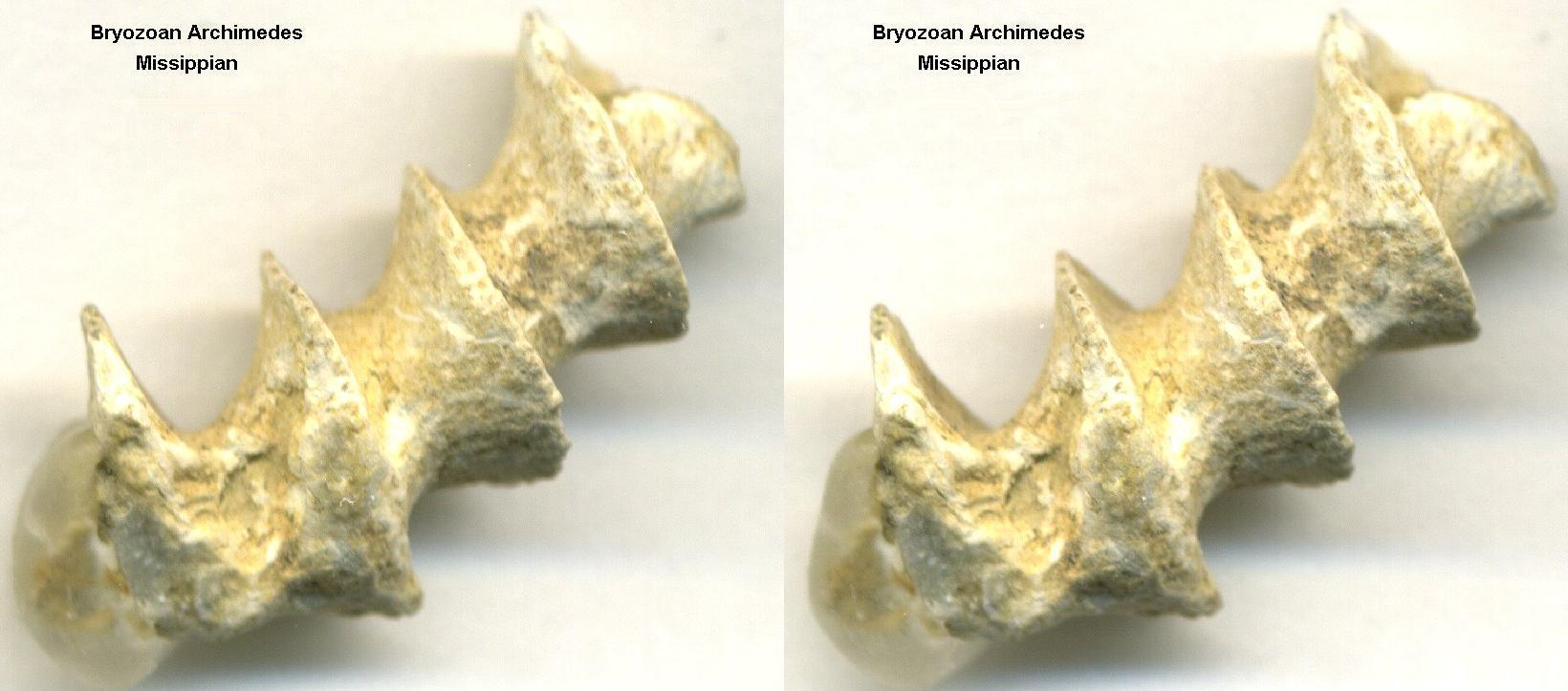
Parallel view
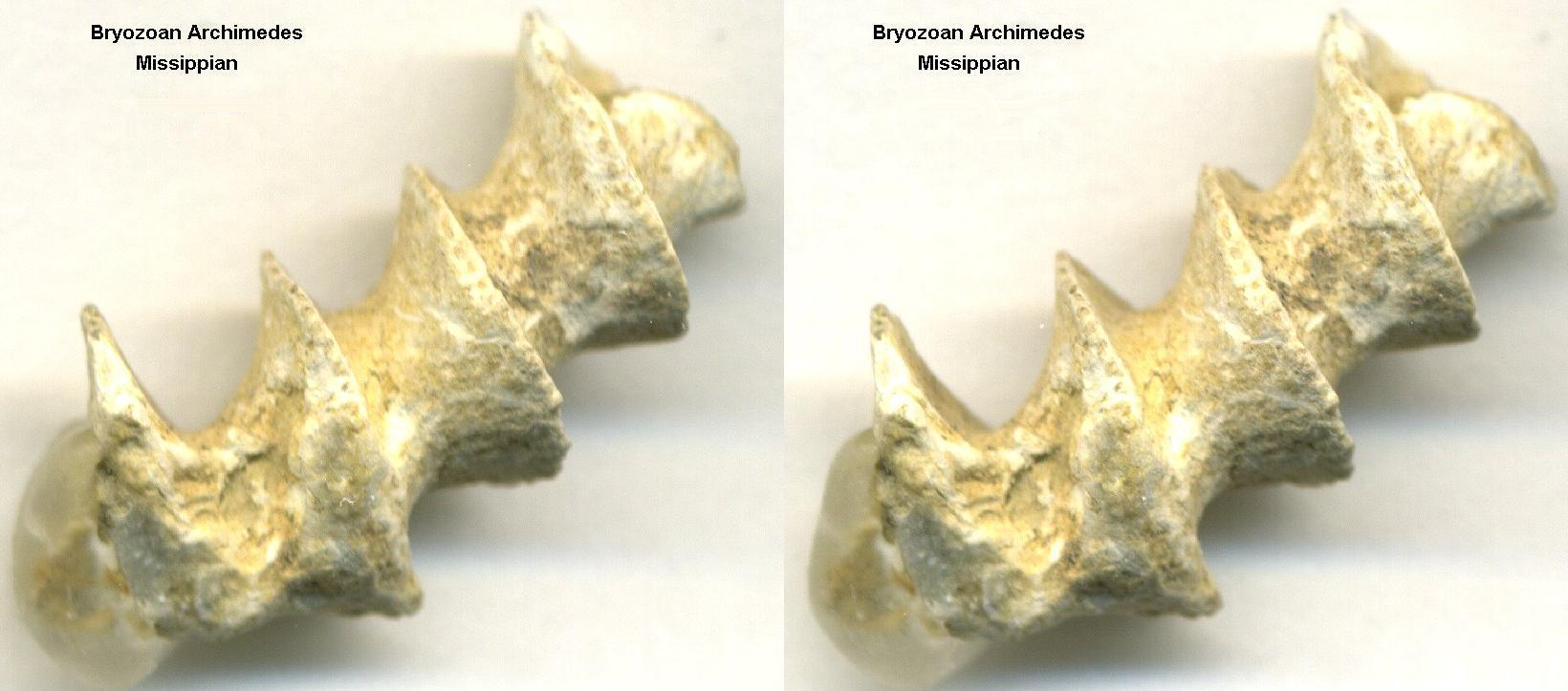
Cross-eye view
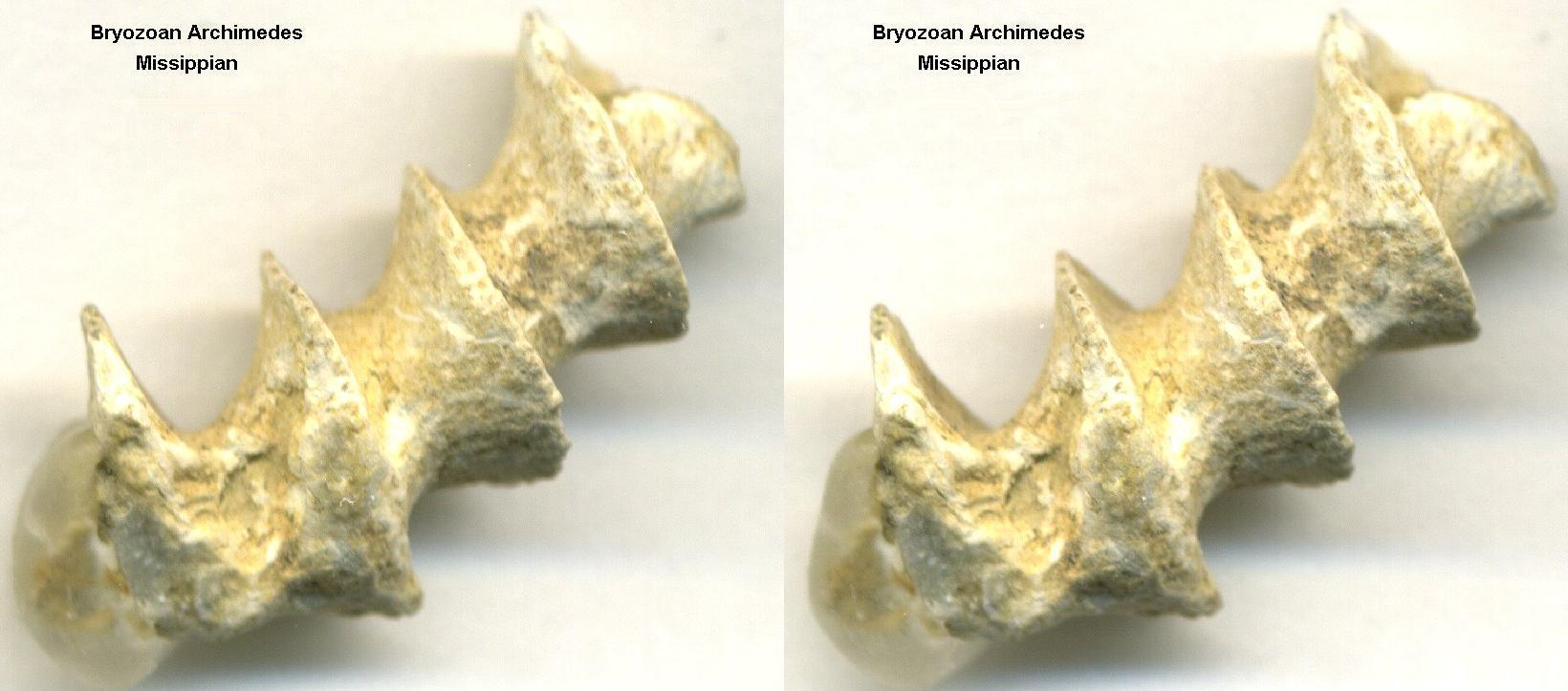

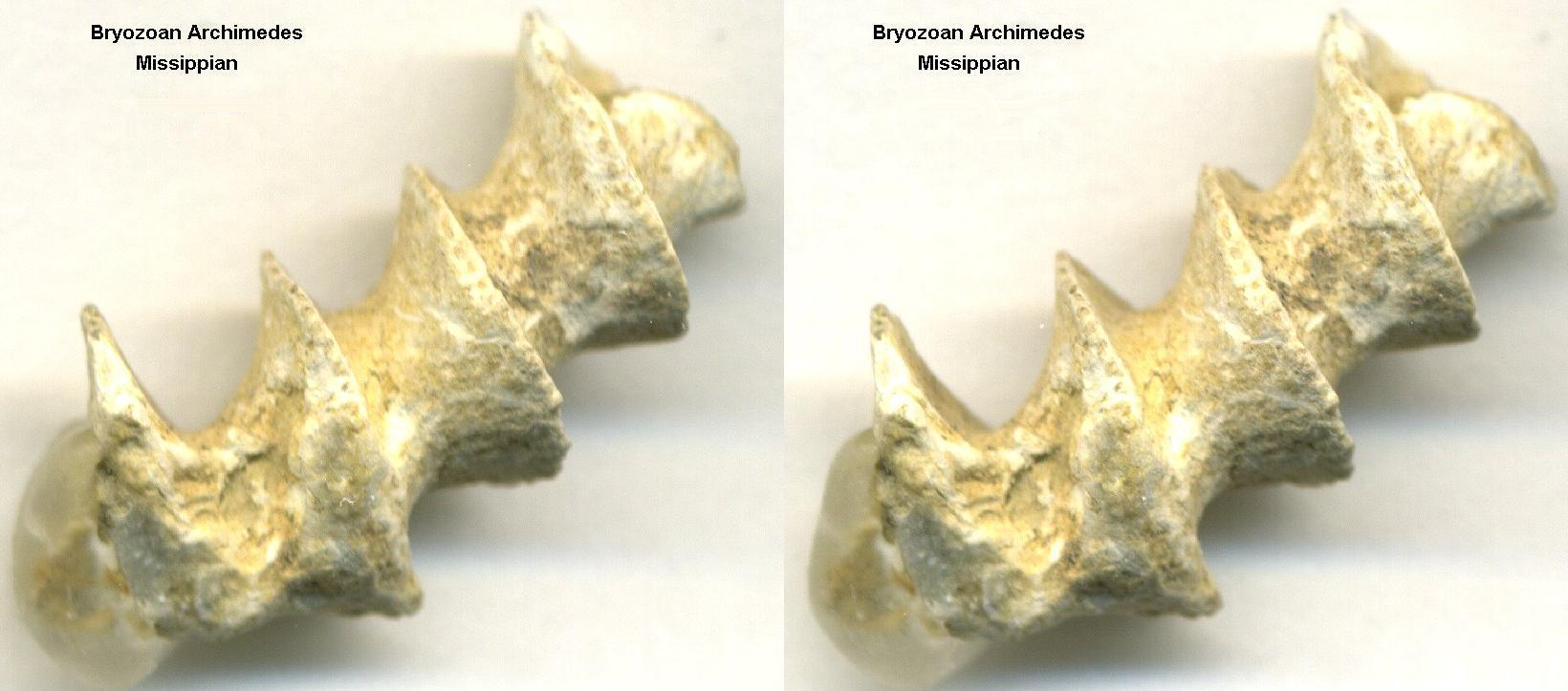
- Fossilized skeleton of Archimedes Bryozoan.

- Anisotrypa

A. solida

- Archimedes (called Archimedipora in early studies)

A. communis
A. compactoides
A. compactus
A. distans
A. fosteri
A. fragilis
A. intermedia (A. intermedius)
A. invaginata (A. invaginatus)
A. lunatus
A. magnus
A. meekanus
A. moorei
A. pitkinensis
A. proutana (A. proutanus)
A. sublaxus
A. swallovana (A. swallovanus)
A. terebriformis

- Batostomella
- Chellotrypa

C. distans

- Chilotrypa

C. regularis

- Dichotrypa

D. levis

- Dyscritella
- Fenestella

F. cumingsi
F. matheri
F. rectangularis
F. serratula
F. tenax

- Fistulipora

F. introspinosa

- Glyptopora

G. crassa
G. michilinia

- Lyropora

L. solida

- Meekopora

M. abrupta
M. tenuis

- Polypora

P. whitei

- Rhombopora
- Septopora

S. biserialis
S. cestriensis
S. subquadrans

- Tabulopora

T. cestriensis
T. microfistulata
T. poculoformis
T refiexa
T. subtilis

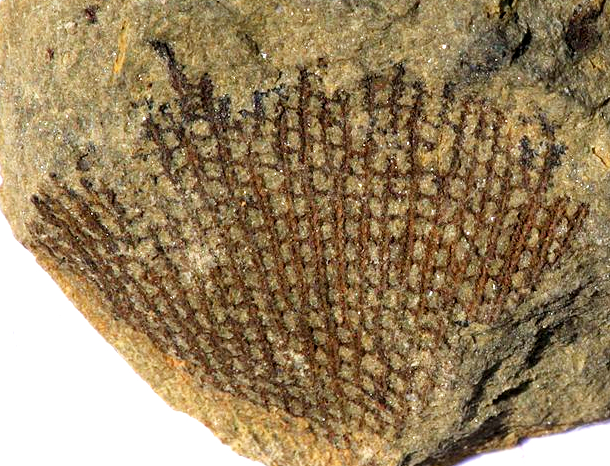
A Devonian Fenestella from Belgium.

=== Brachiopoda ===
- Adectorhynchus

A. suspectum

- Athyris

A. cestriensis

- Buxtonia

B. arkansana

- Camarophoria

C. cestriensis
C explanata

- Chonetes

C. oklahomensis
C. sericeus
C. tumescens
Cliothyridina

- C. sublamellosa
- Composita (See unidentified section)

C. subquadrata
C. trinuclea

- Crania

C. infimbriata

- Diaphragmus
- Dielasma

D. arkansanum
D. formosum
D. illinoisensis
D. shumardanum
D. whitfieldi

- Echinoconchus (See unidentified section)

E. alternatus

- Eumetria

E. costata
E. pitkinensis
E. vera

- Girtyella

G. indianensis

- Hustedia

H. multicostata

- Krotavia

K. lucerna

- Lingula
- Lingulidiscina

L. newberryi var. moorefieldana and ovata

- Linoproductus

L. pileiformis

- Martinia
- Orthotetes

O. kaskaskiensis
O. stenopsis
O. subglobosus (var. protensa)
O. uspectum

- Productus

P. cestriensis
P. fasciculatus

- Pustula
- Reticularia

R. setigera

- Spirifer

S. leidyi
S. pellaensis

- Spiriferina

S. spinosa

- Streptorhynchus
- Syringothyris

S. aequalis

- Tetracamera

T. neogenes

=== Bivalvia, Bivalves ===
This group was also referred to by another name in earlier studies: Pelecypoda.

- Allorisma

A. walkeri

- Astartella
- Aviculopecten

A. batesvillensis
A. eurekensis
A. keoughensis
A. morrowensis
A. multilineatus
A. pitkinensis

- Conocardium

C. peculiare

- Cypricardella (See unidentified section)
- Edmondia

E. crassa (Along with E. crassa var. suborbiculoidea)
E. pitkinensis

- Leda

L. vaseyana

- Leiopteria
- Leptodesma
- Myalina

M. compressa
M. longicardinalis

- Nucula

N. illinoisensis

- Parallelodon
- Pteronites
- Schizodus (See unidentified section)

S. arkansanus
S. chesterensis
S. depressus
S. insignis

- Solenomya
- Sphenotus

S. cherokeense
S. gibsonense
S. quadriplicatum

=== Scaphopoda, Tusk Shells ===
- Laevidentalium

=== Gastropoda, Snails ===
- Bellerophon (See unidentified section)
- B. pitkinensis
- Bucanella
- Colpites
- Euphemites

E. incarinatus

- Clabrocingulum
- Gosseletina (See unidentified section)
- Helcionopsis

H. reticulatus

- Hemizyga
- Holopea

H. newtonensis

- Latischisma
- Leptoptygma (See unidentified section)
- Microptychis
- Mourlonia

M. angulata

- Naticopsis
- Neilsonia
- Phanerotremas
- Platyceras

P. subrotundum

- Pseudozygopleura
- Sphaerodoma

S. subcorpulenta

- Stegocoelia
- Straparolus

S. planidorsatus
S. triliris

- Strobeus (See unidentified section)
- Strophostylus

=== Cephalopoda ===
- Arcanoceras

A. furnishi

- Coloceras (see unidentified section)
- Cravenoceras

C. hesperium
C. richardsonianum

- Cycloceras

C. randolphensis
C. equoyahensis

- Dolorthoceras (See unidentified section)

D. eurekensis

- Eoasianites

E. globosus

- Eumorphoceras

E. bisulcatum

- Metadimorphoceras
- Mooreoceras
- Syngastrioceras
- Trizonoceras

=== Trilobita ===
- Grifithides

G. pustulosus

- Kaskia

K. chesterensis
K. pitkinensis

- Paladin

P. mucronatus

=== Ostracoda ===
- Glyptopleurain

G. optina

- Paraparchites
- Primitia

P. fayettevillensis

=== Vertebrata ===
- Cladodus
- Deltodus
- Petalodus

=== Plantae, Plants ===
"Encrusting Algae" has been reported but not assigned to any genus.

- Archaeolithophyllum
- Asphaltina

A. cordillerensis

- Girvanella
- Rectangulina

=== Unidentified ===
Following is a list of fossils also found in the Pitkin by Easton in 1943 that have gone unidentified.

- A "Cup Coral"
- A member of the genus Pentremites
- Three species within Agassizocrinus
- Two species within Scytalocrinus
- A totally unidentifiable Crinoid
- Two species of Bellerophon
- Two species of Gosseletina
- Two species of Leptoptygma
- Two Species of Strobeus
- One species each of Composita and Echinoconchus
- Two species of Cypricardella
- Two species of Coloceras, one of which may actually be Leuroceras
- One species of Dolorthoceras
- An unnamed shark spine

== See also ==
- List of fossiliferous stratigraphic units in Arkansas
- Paleontology in Arkansas
