= Imo Formation =

Geologic unit in northern Arkansas

- Stratigraphic range: Carboniferous: Mississippian
- Type: Formation
- Unit of: Pitkin Formation
- Underlies: Hale Formation

Location
- Region: Arkansas
- Country: United States

Type section
- Named for: Imo, Searcy County, Arkansas
- Named by: Mackenzie Gordon Jr.

The Imo Formation, or Imo Shale, is a geologic unit in northern Arkansas that dates to the Chesterian Series of the late Mississippian. The Imo is considered to be a member of the upper Pitkin Formation, and is the most recent Mississippian age rock in Arkansas. The Imo Shale unconformably underlies the Pennsylvanian age Hale Formation

The stratigraphic placement of this interval has long been debated. It was introduced in 1964 as the "Imo Formation," representing an interval of shale that was presumably of Mississippian and possibly of Pennsylvanian age. However, in a footnote in the first publication to use this designation, the author noted that the shale interval had been mapped into the Pennsylvanian Cane Hill Member of the Hale Formation and revoked use of the name "Imo Formation".

The name was reintroduced in 1973 as the "Imo Shale", and in 2010 was classified as a member of the Mississippian age Pitkin Formation.

== Paleontology ==
=== Cephalopods ===
- Anthracoceras
  - A. discus
- Cravenoceras
  - C. mapesi
- Delepinoceras
  - D. bressoni
- Eumorphoceras
  - E. imoense
  - E. richardsoni
- Fayettevillea
  - F. bransoni
  - F. friscoense
- Metadimorphoceras
  - M. saundersi
- Peytonoceras
  - P. ornatum
- Rhadinites
  - R. miseri
- Somoholites
  - S. cadiconiformisj
- Stenoglaphyrites
  - S. involutum
- Syngastrioceras
  - S. imprimis

=== Flora ===
- Stacheoides
  - S. tenuis

=== Foraminifera ===
- Earlandia
- Endothyra
- Eosigmoilina
  - E. explicata
  - E. rugosa
- Monotaxinoides
- Neoarchaediscus
- Priscella
- Trepeilopsis
- Zellerina
  - Z. discoidea

=== Ostracods ===
- Cavellina
- Cornigella
- Gortanella
- Healdia
- Healdioides
- Hollinella
- Monoceratina
- Sargentina
- Youngiella

== See also ==
- List of fossiliferous stratigraphic units in Arkansas
- Paleontology in Arkansas
