= Witts Springs Formation =

Geologic Process of Formation

- Stratigraphic range: Carboniferous: Pennsylvanian
- Type: Formation

Lithology
- Primary: sandstone
- Other: limestone, siltstone, and shale

Location
- Region: Arkansas
- Country: United States

Type section
- Named for: Witts Springs, Arkansas, Arkansas
- Named by: Ernest E. Glick, Sherwood Earl Frezon, and Mackenzie Gordon Jr.

The Witts Springs Formation is a sandstone geologic formation in Arkansas with thin layers of limestone, shale, and siltstone. It preserves fossils dating back to the Carboniferous period.

== Paleontology ==
=== Bivalves ===
- Aviculopecten

A. arkansanus

- Conocardium
- Myalina
- Pleurophorus
- Posidonia
- Sphenotus

=== Brachiopods ===
- Antiquatonia

A. morrowensis

- Composita

C. ozarkana

- Juresania
- Linoproductus
- Schizophoria

S. altirostris

- Spirifer

=== Cephalopods ===
- Gastrioceras

G. adaense

- Glaphyrites

G. globosus
G. morrowensis
G. oblatus

- Mooreoceras
- Pygmaeoceras
- Stenopronorites

S. arkansiensis

=== Coral ===
- Michelinia

=== Gastropods ===
- Bellerophon
- Donaldina
- Euphemites
- Glabrocingulum
- Knightites (Retispira or Cymatospire)

=== Scaphopods ===
- Laevidentalium

=== Trilobites ===
- Paladin

== See also ==
- List of fossiliferous stratigraphic units in Arkansas
- Paleontology in Arkansas
