= Zephyroceras =

Scientific classification
- Kingdom: Animalia
- Phylum: Mollusca
- Class: Cephalopoda
- Subclass: †Ammonoidea
- Order: †Goniatitida
- Family: †Stenolaphyritidae
- Genus: †Zephyroceras; Kullmann, 1962

Extinct genus of molluscs

Zephyroceras is a genus belonging to the Somoholitoidea superfamily. They are an extinct group of ammonoid, which are shelled cephalopods related to squids, belemnites, octopuses, and cuttlefish, and more distantly to the nautiloids.
