= Pseudoparalegoceratidae =

Scientific classification
- Kingdom: Animalia
- Phylum: Mollusca
- Class: Cephalopoda
- Subclass: †Ammonoidea
- Order: †Goniatitida
- Superfamily: †Somoholitoidea
- Family: †Pseudoparalegoceratidae

Genera
- Eoparalegoceras; Phaneroceras; Pseudoparalegoceras

Extinct family of molluscs

Pseudoparalegoceratidae is one of six families of the Somoholitoidea superfamily. They are an extinct group of ammonoid, which are shelled cephalopods related to squids, belemnites, octopuses, and cuttlefish, and more distantly to the nautiloids.
