= Carinamala =

Carinamala Temporal range: Dresbachian

Scientific classification
- Kingdom: Animalia
- Phylum: Arthropoda
- Clade: †Artiopoda
- Class: †Trilobita
- Order: †Ptychopariida
- Family: †Cedariidae
- Genus: †Carinamala; Palmer, 1962

Carinamala is an extinct genus from the trilobite class of fossil marine arthropods which lived from 501 to 490 million years ago during the Dresbachian faunal stage of the late Cambrian Period.
