= Glaphyrites =

Glaphyrites Temporal range: Carboniferous-Permian, 326–279 Ma

Scientific classification
- Kingdom: Animalia
- Phylum: Mollusca
- Class: Cephalopoda
- Subclass: †Ammonoidea
- Order: †Goniatitida
- Family: †Glaphyritidae
- Genus: †Glaphyrites; Ruzhencev, 1936

Species
- See text

Extinct genus of molluscs

Glaphyrites is a genus of extinct cephalopods belonging to the family Glaphyritidae, included in the superfamily Somoholitoidea. So far, over 50 species have been described.

Some specimens have been found at San Gregorio Formation, Uruguay.

== Species ==
- Glaphyrites aktubensis
- Glaphyrites angulatus
- Glaphyrites anguloumbilicatus
- Glaphyrites angustilobatus
- Glaphyrites bakeri
- Glaphyrites darwenensis
- Glaphyrites deciensis
- Glaphyrites depressus
- Glaphyrites drakei
- Glaphyrites embolicus
- Glaphyrites europaeus
- Glaphyrites excelsus
- Glaphyrites fayettevillae
- Glaphyrites fornicatus
- Glaphyrites holmesi
- Glaphyrites hyattianus
- Glaphyrites inyoensis
- Glaphyrites kansasensis
- Glaphyrites kettlesingensis
- Glaphyrites latus
- Glaphyrites lineatus
- Glaphyrites micromphalus
- Glaphyrites millsi
- Glaphyrites modestus
- Glaphyrites moorei
- Glaphyrites morrowensis
- Glaphyrites multicavus
- Glaphyrites nevadensis
- Glaphyrites nolinensis
- Glaphyrites oklahomensis
- Glaphyrites pararhymnus
- Glaphyrites pericycloides
- Glaphyrites postremus
- Glaphyrites postsolidus
- Glaphyrites rarus
- Glaphyrites raymondi
- Glaphyrites rhymnus
- Glaphyrites roemeri
- Glaphyrites ruzencevi
- Glaphyrites saharensis
- Glaphyrites sakmarensis
- Glaphyrites solidus
- Glaphyrites stenomphalus
- Glaphyrites striatus
- Glaphyrites subangulatus
- Glaphyrites subcavus
- Glaphyrites submodestus
- Glaphyrites subplicatus
- Glaphyrites subtilicostatus
- Glaphyrites sultanaevi
- Glaphyrites uralensis
- Glaphyrites warei
- Glaphyrites welleri
- Glaphyrites wilsoni
