= Deiracephalus =

Deiracephalus Temporal range: Dresbachian

Scientific classification
- Kingdom: Animalia
- Phylum: Arthropoda
- Clade: †Artiopoda
- Class: †Trilobita
- Order: †Ptychopariida
- Family: †Llanoaspididae
- Genus: †Deiracephalus; Resser, 1935

Extinct Cambrian genus of trilobites

Deiracephalus is an extinct genus of trilobites. It lived from 501 to 490 million years ago during the Dresbachian faunal stage of the late Cambrian Period.
