= Baschkirites =

Baschkirites Temporal range: Bashkirian

Scientific classification
- Kingdom: Animalia
- Phylum: Mollusca
- Class: Cephalopoda
- Subclass: Ammonoidea
- Order: Goniatitida
- Family: Girtyoceratidae
- Genus: Baschkirites Librovitch, 1957

Species
- Baschkirites discoidalis; Baschkirites dostalakus; Baschkirites granosus; baschkirites planus; Baschkirites vasilkovskyi

Baschkirites is an extinct cephalopod genus belonging to the ammonoid order Goniatitida that lived during the Early Carboniferous (Bashkirian).

== Description ==
The shell of Baschkirites is discoidal, with narrow umbilicus in adult stage. Growth lines are fine, forward slanting, resulting in long ventrolateral salients (protrusions). The entire shell may be covered with simple and sometimes granose spiral ornamentation. Ventral lobe of the suture is wide and V-shaped, with moderately high median saddle; the first lateral saddle is rounded or subacute, the adventitious lobe deep and acute.

== Distribution ==
Carboniferous of the Russian Federation, United States, Uzbekistan
