= Somoholitoidea =

Scientific classification
- Domain: Eukaryota
- Kingdom: Animalia
- Phylum: Mollusca
- Class: Cephalopoda
- Subclass: †Ammonoidea
- Order: †Goniatitida
- Suborder: †Goniatitina
- Superfamily: †Somoholitoidea; Ruzhencev 1938

Families
- Clistoceratidae; Dunbaritidae; Glaphyritidae; Pseudoparalegoceratidae; Somoholitidae; Stenolaphyritidae

Synonyms
- Somoholitaceae

Extinct superfamily of molluscs

Somoholitoidea is one of seventeen superfamilies of the Goniatitina suborder. They are an extinct group of ammonoid, which are shelled cephalopods related to squids, belemnites, octopodes, and cuttlefish, and more distantly to the nautiloids.
