= Mackenzie Gordon Jr. =

American paleontologist (1913–1992)

- Born: April 4, 1913
- Died: January 30, 1992 (aged 78)
- Known for: Authority on carboniferous fossils
- Scientific career
- Fields: Invertebrate paleontology

Mackenzie Gordon Jr. (April 4, 1913 – January 30, 1992) was an American invertebrate paleontologist. He was an expert on Carboniferous fossils. Gordon worked for the United States Geological Survey for 40 years, from 1941 to 1981. He was a research associate at the National Museum of Natural History from 1981 to his death in 1992.
