= Rhipidomella =

Rhipidomella Temporal range: Devonian-Permian ~436–252 Ma

Scientific classification
- Domain: Eukaryota
- Kingdom: Animalia
- Phylum: Brachiopoda
- Class: Rhynchonellata
- Order: †Orthida
- Family: †Rhipidomellidae
- Subfamily: †Rhipidomellinae
- Genus: †Rhipidomella

Species
- See text

Extinct genus of brachiopod

Rhipidomella is an extinct genus of brachiopod belonging to the order Orthida and family Rhipidomellidae. Specimens have been found in Carboniferous to Permian beds in southwest Asia, the Moscow Basin, and North America.

== Species ==
- R. cora d'Orbigny 1842
- R. dubia Hall 1856
- R. lyelliana De Koninck 1851
