= Beecheria =

Beecheria Temporal range: Carboniferous-Permian ~361–254 Ma

Scientific classification
- Domain: Eukaryota
- Kingdom: Animalia
- Phylum: Brachiopoda
- Class: Rhynchonellata
- Order: Terebratulida
- Family: †Beecheriidae
- Genus: †Beecheria; Hall and Clarke 1893

Species
- See text

Extinct genus of brachiopod

Beecheria is an extinct genus of brachiopod belonging to the order Terebratulida and family Beecheriidae. Fossils of this genus have been found in Mississippian to Permian beds in Eurasia, Australia, North America, and South America. The genus was part of the Levipustula fauna characteristic of cold water conditions. "Nests" of Beecheria have been found in fossil low temperature hydrothermal vent communities from the early Carboniferous in Newfoundland.

== Species ==
- B. angusta Netschajew 1894
- B. boranelensis Peou and Engel 1979
- B. chouteauensis Weller 1914
- B. curva Smirnova 2009
- B. elliptica Cooper and Grant 1976
- B. expansa Cooper and Grant 1976
- B. kargaliensis Smirnova 2007
- B. lidarensis Diener 1915
- B. magna Jin and Ye 1979
- B. netschajewi Grigor'yeva 1967
- B. samarica Smirnova 2007
