= Schizodus =

Schizodus Temporal range: Silurian–Late Permian

Scientific classification
- Kingdom: Animalia
- Phylum: Mollusca
- Class: Bivalvia
- Order: Trigoniida
- Family: †Schizodidae
- Genus: †Schizodus; King, 1844

Extinct genus of bivalves

Schizodus is an extinct genus of shallow marine clams. It lived from the Silurian to Late Permian periods.

Schizodus represents the primitive stage of schizodonts, clams having reverse V-shaped scissurate hinge teeth (still triangular in Schizodus), and often an elongated lateral tooth.
