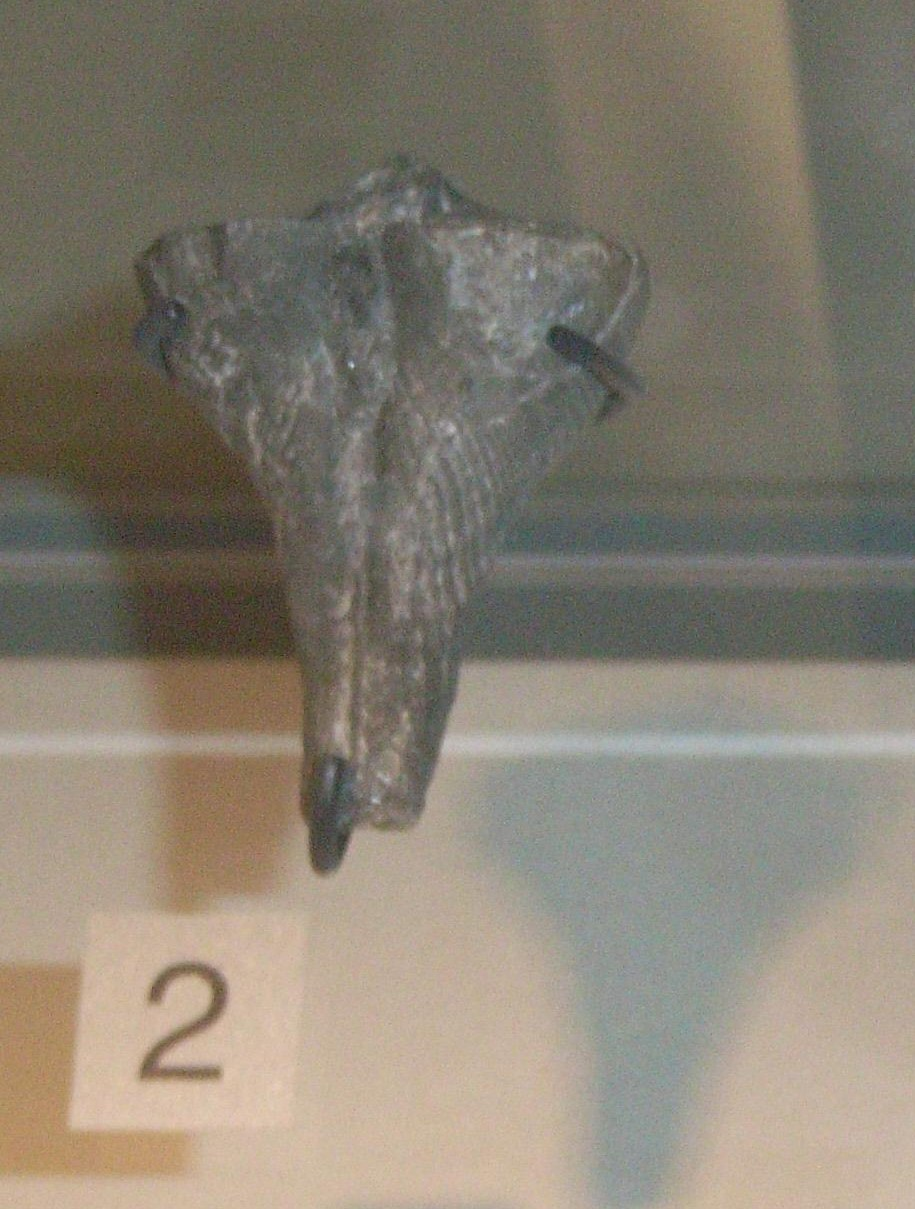
- Conocardium konincki

Scientific classification
- Kingdom: Animalia
- Phylum: Mollusca
- Class: †Rostroconchia
- Order: †Conocardiida
- Family: †Conocardiidae
- Genus: †Conocardium; Bronn 1835

Type species
- Cardium aliforme J. de C. Sowerby 1827

= Conocardium =

Conocardium Temporal range: Late Ordovician-Late Permian ~449.5–252.3 Ma

Extinct genus of molluscs

Conocardium is an extinct genus of Rostroconchian mollusk. Its shell-mouth grew to be 2–3 inches (51–76 mm) across. It fed on tiny plants and animals in the water. Fossils have been found all over the world from Ordovician to Permian formations.

== Species ==
The following species have been described:

- C. acadianum
- C. aliforme (type)
- C. altum
- C. aquisgranense
- C. armatum
- C. cresswelli
- C. decussatum
- C. denticulatum
- C. elongatum
- C. eximum
- C. ferox
- C. formosum
- C. frater
- C. fusiforme
- C. gogoensis
- C. gympiense
- C. hainense
- C. immatura
- C. incarceratum
- C. inceptum
- C. inflatum
- C. konincki
- C. longipennis
- C. lyelli
- C. nexile
- C. oehlerti
- C. philipsii
- C. plinthinatus
- C. prunum
- C. pseudobellum
- C. regulare
- C. renardi
- C. retusum
- C. richmondense
- C. securiforme
- C. sowerbyi
- C. spinalatum
- C. tripartitum
- C. truncata
- C. truncatum
- C. uralicum
- C. ventriculosum
- C. villmarense
