= Eostaffella =

Eostaffella Temporal range: Carboniferous-Permian

Scientific classification
- Domain: Eukaryota
- Clade: Sar
- Clade: Rhizaria
- Phylum: Retaria
- Subphylum: Foraminifera
- Class: Globothalamea (?)
- Order: †Fusulinida
- Family: †Eostaffellidae
- Genus: †Eostaffella; Rauzer-Chernousova, 1948

Species
- See text

Extinct genus of fusulinid

Eostaffella is an extinct genus of fusulinid belonging to the family Eostaffellidae. Specimens of the genus have been found in Carboniferous to Permian beds in Europe, Asia, and North America.

== Species ==
- E. acuta Grozdilova and Lebedeva 1950
- E. donbassica Kireeva 1949
- E. galinae Ganelina 1956
- E. irenae Ganelina 1956
- E. lepida Grozdilova and Lebedeva 1950
- E. mosquensis Vissarionova 1948
- E. pinguis Thompson 1944
- E. postmosquensis Kireeva 1951
- E. serotina Leven 1992
