= Earlandia =

Earlandia Temporal range: 409.1–130.0 Ma

Scientific classification
- Domain: Eukaryota
- (unranked): SAR
- (unranked): Rhizaria
- Superphylum: Retaria
- Phylum: Foraminifera
- Class: incertae sedis
- Order: Fusulinida
- Family: Earlandiidae
- Genus: †Earlandia Plummer, 1930

Species
- †Earlandia aspera Pronina, 1963; †Earlandia cannulaeformis Reitlinger, 1971; †Earlandia condoni Crespin, 1958; †Earlandia consternatio Conkin, 1961; †Earlandia elegans ex gr. (Rauzer-Chernousova & Reitlinger, 1937); †Earlandia norilskense Reitlinger, 1971; †Earlandia perparva Plummer, 1930; †Earlandia pulchra Cummings, 1955; †Earlandia giga O. Vinn, O. Tinn, L. Lang, M. Isakar, and U. Toom, 2026

Genus of single-celled organisms

Earlandia was a genus of prehistoric foraminifera.

== See also ==
- Arthur Earland (1866–1958), a British oceanographer, microscopist and expert on Foraminifera
- List of prehistoric foraminifera genera
