= Septopora =

Septopora Temporal range: Carboniferous-Permian ~345–252 Ma

Scientific classification
- Kingdom: Animalia
- Phylum: Bryozoa
- Class: Stenolaemata
- Order: †Fenestrida
- Family: †Septoporidae
- Genus: †Septopora; Prout, 1859

Species
- See text

Extinct genus of bryozoan

Septopora is an extinct genus of bryozoan belonging to the order Fenestrida. It has been found in Pennsylvanian to Permian beds in North America, South America, Australia, and southwest and east Asia.

== Species ==
- S. alternata Moore, 1929
- S. andeana Sakagami, 1995
- S. bilateralis McColloch et al., 1994
- S. biserialis Swallow, 1858
- S. blanda Moore, 1929
- S. cestriensis Prout, 1859
- S. diamorpha Lu, 1958
- S. distorta Kruchinina, 1986
- S. exornata Gorjunova, 1975
- S. flabellata Nikiforova, 1933
- S. flabellatiformis Romantchuk, 1970
- S. guangdongensis Li, 1977
- S. incaica Chronic, 1949
- S. lineata Nikiforova, 1933
- S. microchambera Lu, 1982
- S. obesus Lu, 1982
- S. orientalis Bassler, 1929
- S. ornata Crockford, 1944
- S. pinnata Ulrich, 1890
- S. quasiorientalis Morozova, 1965
- S. robusta Moore, 1929
- S. sinensis Lu, 1958
- S. spinulosa Moore, 1929
- S. tarazi Sakagami, 1980
