= List of the Paleozoic life of Texas =

This list of the Paleozoic life of Texas contains the various prehistoric life-forms whose fossilized remains have been reported from within the US state of Texas and are between 538.8 and 252.17 million years of age.

== A ==
- †Aboculus – type locality for genus
  - †Aboculus robustus – type locality for species
- †Acanthocladia
  - †Acanthocladia americana
  - †Acanthocladia guadalupensis
- †Acanthoclema
- †Acanthocoryna
  - †Acanthocoryna stauroma
- †Acanthocrania
  - †Acanthocrania alta – type locality for species
  - †Acanthocrania conferta – type locality for species
  - †Acanthocrania densispina – type locality for species
  - †Acanthocrania intermedia
  - †Acanthocrania magna
  - †Acanthocrania minutispinosa – type locality for species
  - †Acanthocrania platys – type locality for species
  - †Acanthocrania regularis
  - †Acanthocrania vasta – type locality for species
- †Acanthopecten
  - †Acanthopecten carboniferus – or unidentified related form
  - †Acanthopecten coloradoensis
  - †Acanthopecten delawarensis – type locality for species
- †Acanthoplecta
  - †Acanthoplecta inopinata – type locality for species
- †Acanthorota – type locality for genus
  - †Acanthorota permiana – type locality for species
- †Acanthoschizorota – type locality for genus
  - †Acanthoschizorota variabilis – type locality for species
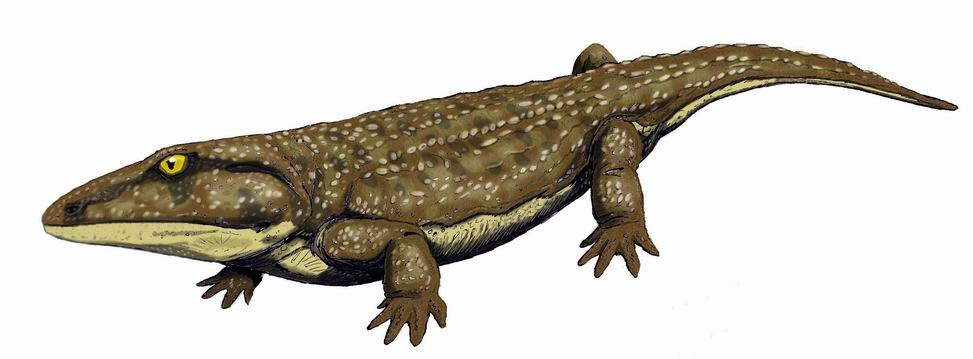
- Restoration of the Permian amphibian Acheloma
  †Acheloma – type locality for genus
  - †Acheloma cumminsi – type locality for species
- †Achistrum
  - †Achistrum brownwoodensis – type locality for species
  - †Achistrum ludwigi – type locality for species
  - †Achistrum monochordata
- †Acolosia – type locality for genus
  - †Acolosia anomala – type locality for species
  - †Acolosia elliptica
  - †Acolosia exasperata
  - †Acolosia glabra
  - †Acolosia magna
  - †Acolosia recepta – type locality for species
- †Acosarina
  - †Acosarina baylorensis – type locality for species
  - †Acosarina mesoplatys – type locality for species
  - †Acosarina minuta – type locality for species
  - †Acosarina peculiaris – type locality for species
  - †Acosarina rectimarginata
- †Acritosia
  - †Acritosia magna
  - †Acritosia magnifica
  - †Acritosia peculiaris – type locality for species
  - †Acritosia silicica
  - †Acritosia solida
  - †Acritosia teguliferoides – type locality for species
  - †Acritosia vestibula
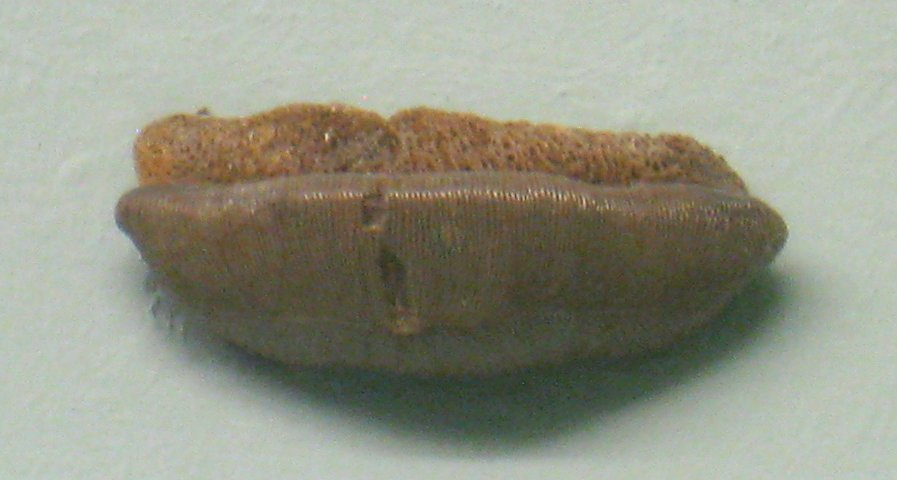
- Fossilized teeth of the Permian-Paleocene cartilaginous fish Acrodus
  †Acrodus – tentative report
  - †Acrodus olsoni – type locality for species
  - †Acrodus sweetlacruzensis – type locality for species
- †Acrothele
- †Actinocoelia
  - †Actinocoelia maeandrina
  - †Actinocoelia verrucosa – type locality for species
- †Actinoconchus
- †Actinohymen – type locality for genus
  - †Actinohymen russelli – type locality for species
- †Actinophrentis
  - †Actinophrentis bonespringense – type locality for species
  - †Actinophrentis columnare – type locality for species
- †Acutichiton
  - †Acutichiton pannuceus – type locality for species
  - †Acutichiton pyrmidalus
- †Adamantina
  - †Adamantina foliacea
- †Adlatipora – type locality for genus
  - †Adlatipora fossulata – type locality for species
- †Adrianites – tentative report
- †Agathiceras
  - †Agathiceras applini – type locality for species
  - †Agathiceras ciscoense – type locality for species
  - †Agathiceras contractum – type locality for species
  - †Agathiceras frechi – type locality for species
  - †Agathiceras girtyi – type locality for species
  - †Agathiceras uralicum
- †Agelesia
  - †Agelesia triagonalis – type locality for species
- †Agmoblastus
  - †Agmoblastus caddense – type locality for species
- †Agnostocrinus
  - †Agnostocrinus ornatus – type locality for species
- †Akmilleria
  - †Akmilleria adkinsi – type locality for species
  - †Akmilleria electraensis
  - †Akmilleria huecoensis – type locality for species
- †Albaillella
  - †Albaillella foremanae – type locality for species
- †Alegeinosaurus
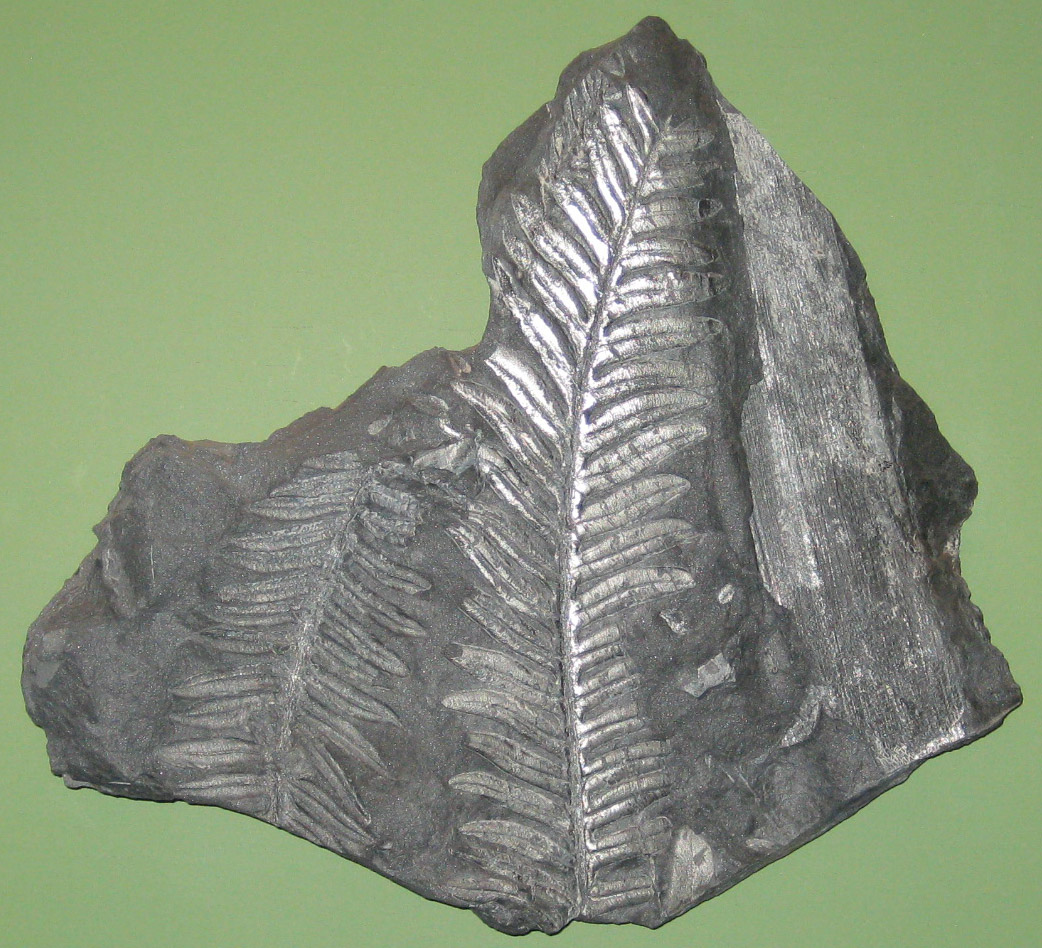
- Fossilized fronds of the Carboniferous-Early Cretaceous seed fern Alethopteris
  †Alethopteris
- †Alilepis
- †Alisporites
  - †Alisporites plicatus – type locality for species
  - †Alisporites zapfei
- †Allagecrinus
  - †Allagecrinus bassleri
- †Allopiloceras
- †Allorhynchus
  - †Allorhynchus circulare
  - †Allorhynchus concentricum
  - †Allorhynchus formulosum
  - †Allorhynchus permianum – type locality for species
  - †Allorhynchus triangulatum – type locality for species
  - †Allorhynchus variabile – type locality for species
  - †Allorhynchus venustulum
- †Allorisma – tentative report
  - †Allorisma albequus
  - †Allorisma dubium – or unidentified related form
- †Allotropiochisma
  - †Allotropiochisma flabellum – type locality for species
  - †Allotropiochisma texanum – type locality for species
  - †Allotropiochisma uddenitense – type locality for species
- †Almites
  - †Almites sellardsi – type locality for species
- †Altadema – type locality for genus
  - †Altadema convexa – type locality for species
- †Altiplecus
  - †Altiplecus argutus
  - †Altiplecus cooperi
  - †Altiplecus deltosus
  - †Altiplecus extensus
  - †Altiplecus glebosus – type locality for species
  - †Altiplecus periosus
  - †Altiplecus trapezoidalis
- †Altudoceras
  - †Altudoceras altudense – type locality for species
  - †Altudoceras cooperi – type locality for species
  - †Altudoceras serratum – type locality for species
- †Alveus – type locality for genus
  - †Alveus depressus – type locality for species
- †Amandophyllum
- †Amaurotoma
  - †Amaurotoma subsinuata
- †Amblysiphonella
- †Ambozone
  - †Ambozone dictyonema
- †Ametoria – type locality for genus
  - †Ametoria residua – type locality for species
- †Ammovertella
- †Amphicrinus
- †Amphipella
  - †Amphipella arcaria
  - †Amphipella attenuata
- †Amphiscapha
  - †Amphiscapha catilloides
  - †Amphiscapha dextrata – type locality for species
  - †Amphiscapha gigantea – type locality for species
  - †Amphiscapha muricata
  - †Amphiscapha subquadrata
- †Amphissites
  - †Amphissites centronotus – or unidentified comparable form
  - †Amphissites knighti – type locality for species
- †Amplexizaphrentis
- †Amplexocarinia
- †Amplexus – report made of unidentified related form or using admittedly obsolete nomenclature
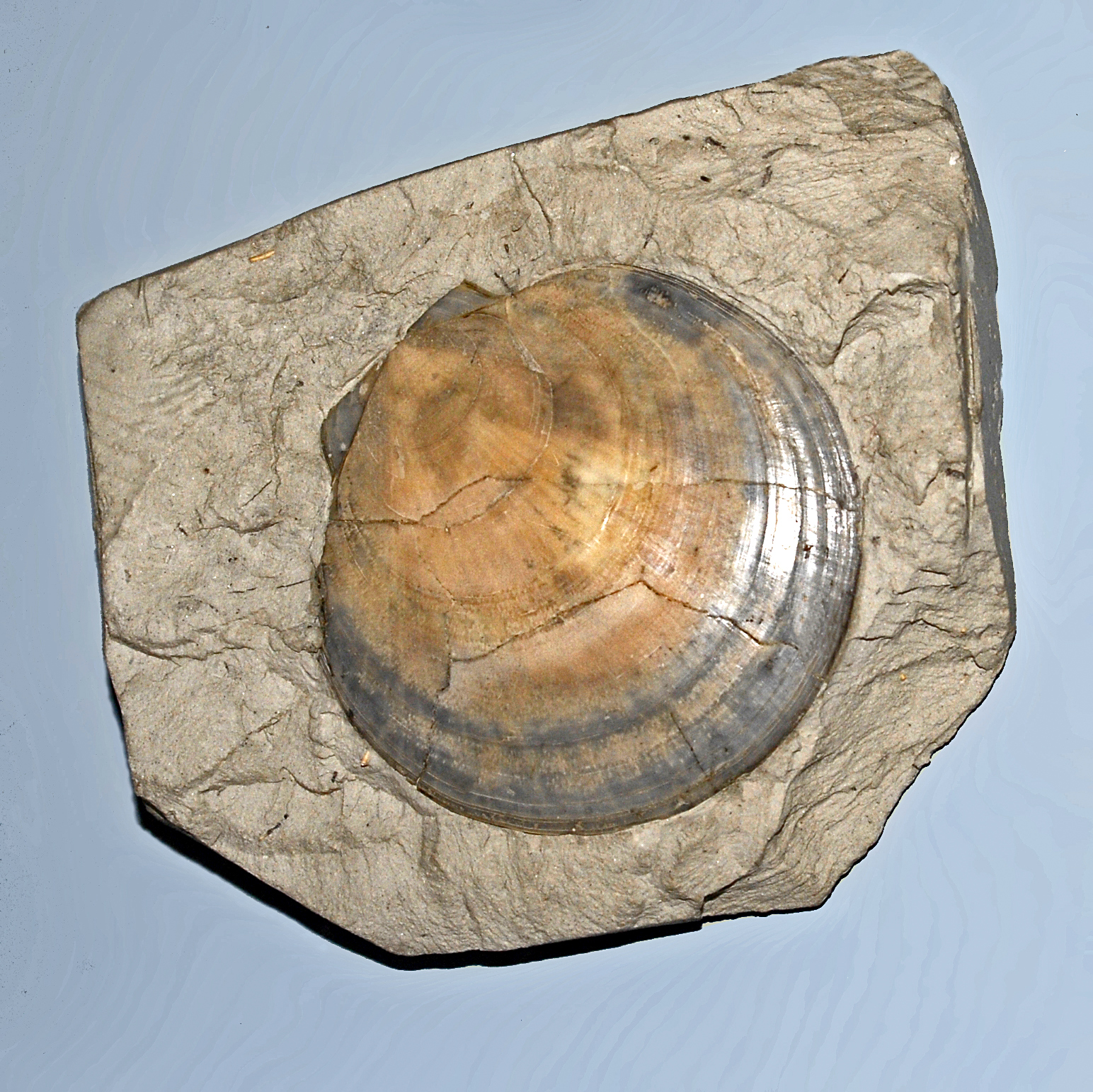
- Fossilized shell of the Carboniferous-modern scallop Amusium
  Amusium – tentative report
- †Ananias
  - †Ananias appeli
  - †Ananias labrectus
  - †Ananias ootomaria – type locality for species
  - †Ananias permianus
  - †Ananias welleri
- †Anatsabites
  - †Anatsabites multiliratus – type locality for species
  - †Anatsabites williamsi
- †Anconochilus – type locality for genus
  - †Anconochilus barnesi – type locality for species
- †Anemonaria
  - †Anemonaria sublaevis – type locality for species
- †Aneuthelasma
  - †Aneuthelasma amygdalinum
- †Angelosaurus – type locality for genus
  - †Angelosaurus dolani – type locality for species
  - †Angelosaurus greeni – type locality for species
- †Angyomphalus
- †Anisodexis
- †Anisopyge – type locality for genus
  - †Anisopyge cooperi – type locality for species
  - †Anisopyge perannulata – type locality for species
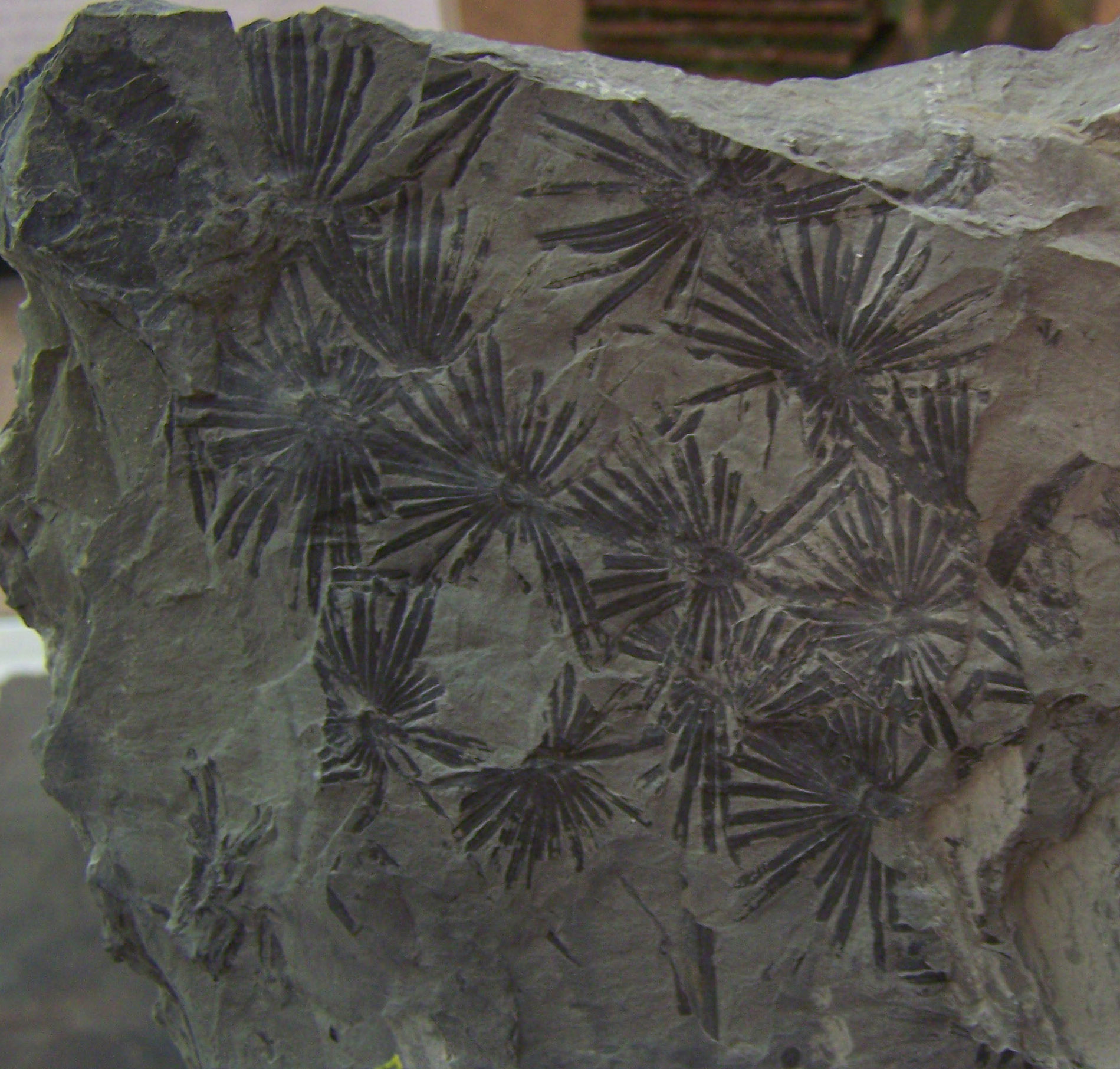
- Fossil of the Carboniferous horsetail relative Annularia
  †Annularia
  - †Annularia maxima
  - †Annularia spicata
  - †Annularia stellata – or unidentified comparable form
- †Annuliconcha
  - †Annuliconcha dentata
  - †Annuliconcha interlineata
- †Anodontacanthus
  - †Anodontacanthus americanus
- †Anomalesia
  - †Anomalesia perplexa
- †Anomaloria
  - †Anomaloria anomala
- †Anomphalus
  - †Anomphalus studiosus – type locality for species
  - †Anomphalus umbilicatus – or unidentified comparable form
  - †Anomphalus verruculiferus
- †Anopliopsis
  - †Anopliopsis subcarinata
- †Anoptychia
- †Anteridocus – type locality for genus
  - †Anteridocus bicostatus
  - †Anteridocus erugatus
  - †Anteridocus eximius
  - †Anteridocus gongylus – type locality for species
  - †Anteridocus paucicostatus – type locality for species
  - †Anteridocus seminudus
  - †Anteridocus subcarinatus
  - †Anteridocus swallovianus – type locality for species
  - †Anteridocus triangulatus
- †Anthracopupa
  - †Anthracopupa ohioensis
- †Anthracosycon
  - †Anthracosycon auriforme – type locality for species
  - †Anthracosycon ficus
  - †Anthracosycon regulare
- †Antiquatonia
  - †Antiquatonia inflativentra
  - †Antiquatonia portlockianus
- †Antronaria – type locality for genus
  - †Antronaria dissona – type locality for species
  - †Antronaria emarginata
  - †Antronaria indentata
  - †Antronaria mesicostalis – type locality for species
  - †Antronaria pluricosta
  - †Antronaria specialis
  - †Antronaria speciosa – type locality for species
  - †Antronaria spectabilis
  - †Antronaria titania
  - †Antronaria transversa
  - †Antronaria voluminosa – type locality for species
- †Apachella
  - †Apachella capertoni – type locality for species
  - †Apachella exaggerata
  - †Apachella franciscana
  - †Apachella glabra – type locality for species
  - †Apachella huecoensis – type locality for species
  - †Apachella nodosa
  - †Apachella powwowensis – type locality for species
  - †Apachella prodontia
  - †Apachella pseudostrigillata
  - †Apachella texana – type locality for species
  - †Apachella translirata
  - †Apachella turbiniformis
- †Apatokephalus
  - †Apatokephalus serratus
- †Aphaurosia
  - †Aphaurosia rotundata
  - †Aphaurosia scutata
- †Aphelaspis
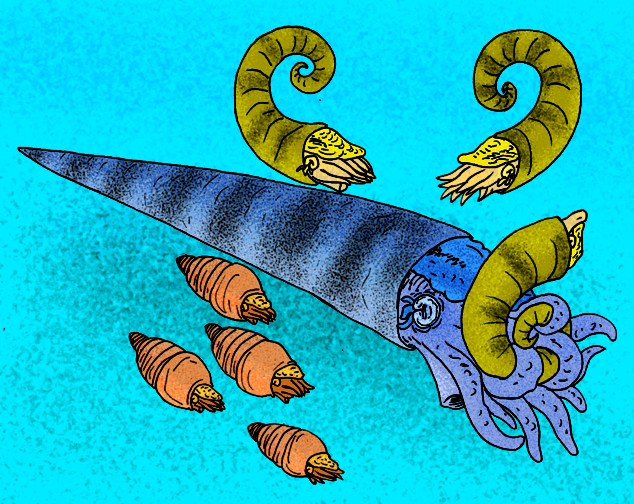
- Restoration of the Late Ordovician nautiloid cephalopod Aphetoceras being preyed upon by a Cameroceras
  †Aphetoceras
- †Aphlebia
- †Apographiocrinus
  - †Apographiocrinus arcuatus – or unidentified comparable form
  - †Apographiocrinus raderi – type locality for species
  - †Apographiocrinus typicalis
- †Apotocardium
  - †Apotocardium cordatum – type locality for species
  - †Apotocardium obliquum
- †Apsisaurus – type locality for genus
  - †Apsisaurus witteri – type locality for species
- †Apsotreta
  - †Apsotreta expansa
- †Apterrinella – tentative report
- †Araeonema
  - †Araeonema virgatum
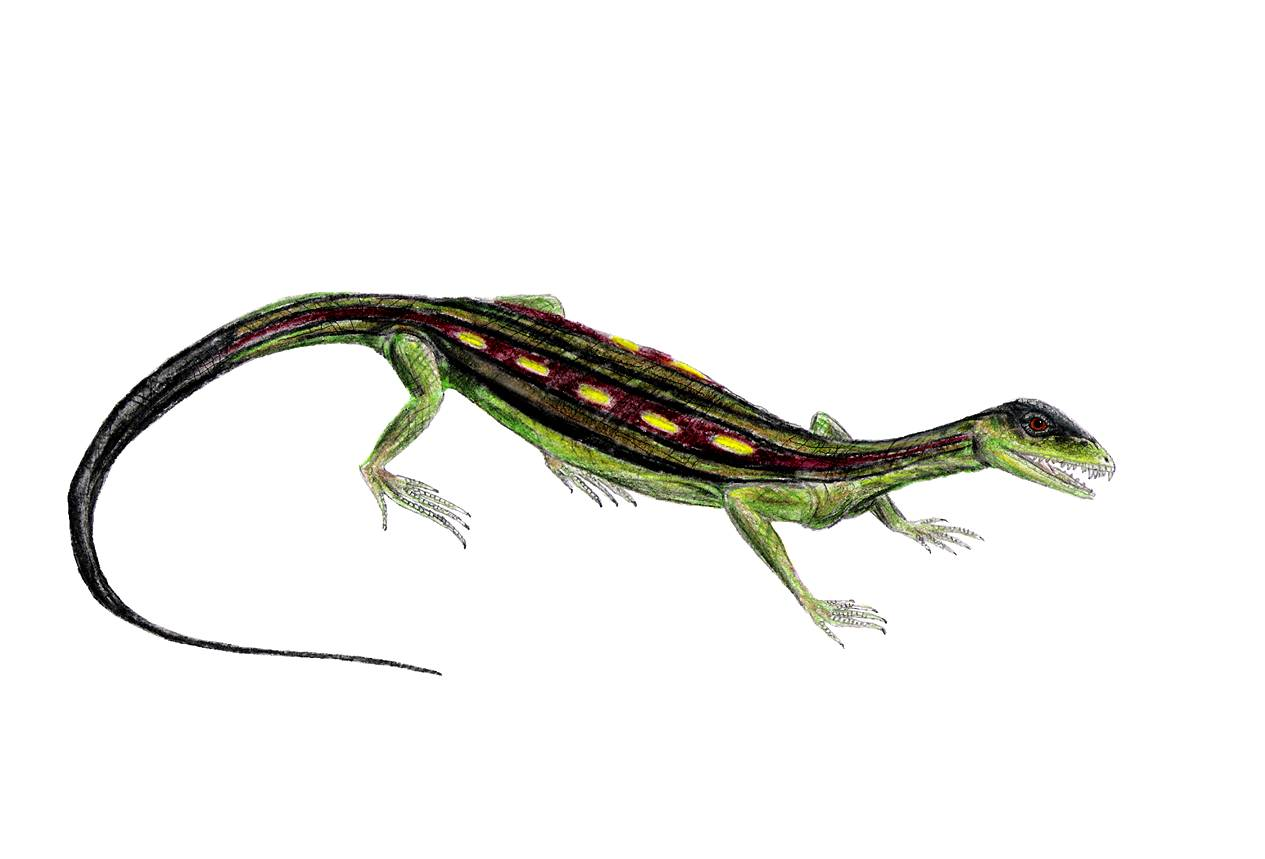
- Life restoration of the Permian reptile Araeoscelis
  †Araeoscelis – type locality for genus
  - †Araeoscelis casei
  - †Araeoscelis gracilis – type locality for species
- †Araucarites
- †Araxathyris – or unidentified comparable form
- †Arceodomus
  - †Arceodomus prolata – type locality for species
- †Archaeocidaris
  - †Archaeocidaris brownwoodensis – type locality for species
  - †Archaeocidaris cratis
- †Archaeocycas
  - †Archaeocycas whitei
- Archaeolithophyllum
- †Archaeolithoporella
- †Archaeoscyphia
  - †Archaeoscyphia annulata
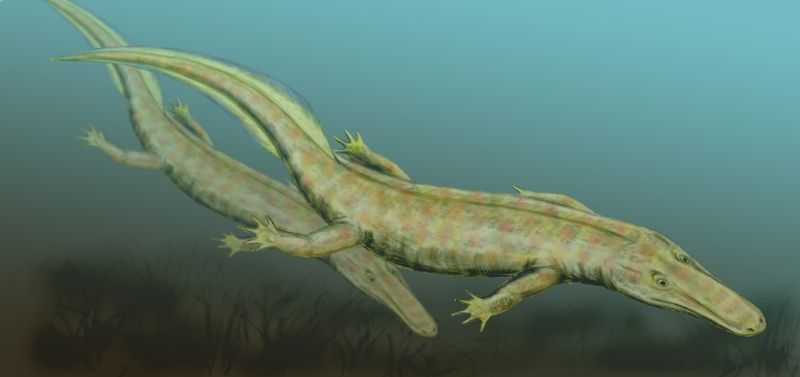
- Life restoration of the Permian amphibian Archeria
  †Archeria – type locality for genus
  - †Archeria crassidisca – type locality for species
- †Archimedes
- †Arcochiton
  - †Arcochiton raymondi
- †Arcuolimbus
  - †Arcuolimbus convexus
- †Arionthia – type locality for genus
  - †Arionthia alata
  - †Arionthia blothrhachis – type locality for species
  - †Arionthia germana – type locality for species
  - †Arionthia lamaria
  - †Arionthia polypleura
- †Aristoceras
  - †Aristoceras appressum
- †Armenoceras
  - †Armenoceras australe
- †Arrectocrinus
  - †Arrectocrinus major – type locality for species
  - †Arrectocrinus texanus – type locality for species
- †Artinskia
  - †Artinskia artiensis
  - †Artinskia lilianae – type locality for species
- †Artisia
- †Asaphellus
- †Aspidiopsis
- †Aspidosaurus – type locality for genus
  - †Aspidosaurus binasser – type locality for species
  - †Aspidosaurus chiton – type locality for species
  - †Aspidosaurus glascocki – type locality for species
  - †Aspidosaurus peltatus – type locality for species
- †Assimulia
  - †Assimulia abscessa – type locality for species
  - †Assimulia arta – type locality for species
  - †Assimulia compacta – type locality for species
  - †Assimulia flexibilis – type locality for species
  - †Assimulia fracta – type locality for species
  - †Assimulia frequentis – type locality for species
  - †Assimulia recrea – type locality for species
  - †Assimulia tergida – type locality for species
  - †Assimulia uddenitense – type locality for species
- †Astartella
  - †Astartella concentrica
  - †Astartella nasuta
  - †Astartella subquadrata
- †Astegosia
  - †Astegosia subquadrata
- †Atelestegastus
  - †Atelestegastus marginatus
- †Athlocrinus
- †Athyris
  - †Athyris bradyensis – type locality for species
- †Attenuatella
  - †Attenuatella texana
- †Aulopora – report made of unidentified related form or using admittedly obsolete nomenclature
- †Aulosteges
- †Aurikirkbya
  - †Aurikirkbya auriformis – type locality for species
  - †Aurikirkbya barbarae – type locality for species
  - †Aurikirkbya wordensis – type locality for species
- †Austinella
  - †Austinella kankakensis
- †Australosutura
  - †Australosutura llanoensis
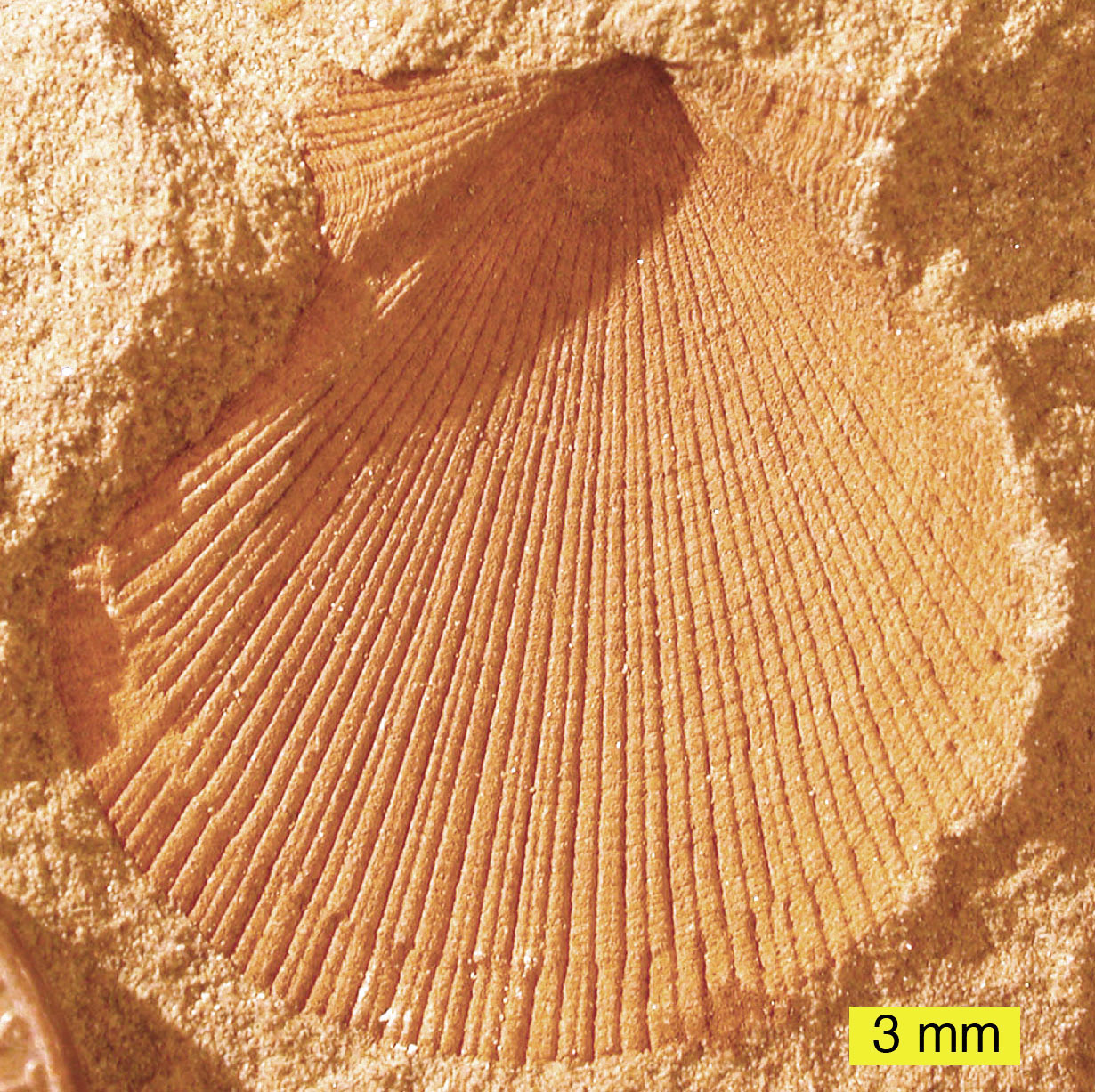
- Mold fossil of a shell of the Early Devonian-Late Triassic bivalve Aviculopecten
  †Aviculopecten
  - †Aviculopecten ballingerana
  - †Aviculopecten girtyi – type locality for species
  - †Aviculopecten gryphus – type locality for species
  - †Aviculopecten herzeri
  - †Aviculopecten occidentalis
  - †Aviculopecten sumnerensis
  - †Aviculopecten texanus
- †Aviculopinna
- †Avonia
  - †Avonia honeycreekensis – type locality for species
  - †Avonia latidorsata
  - †Avonia meekana
  - †Avonia pustulifera – or unidentified comparable form
  - †Avonia signata
  - †Avonia subhorrida
  - †Avonia walcottiana

0 Links

== B ==
- †Babylonites – type locality for genus
  - †Babylonites acutus – type locality for species
  - †Babylonites carinatus – type locality for species
  - †Babylonites conicus – type locality for species
  - †Babylonites turritus – type locality for species
- †Bactrites
  - †Bactrites elcapitanensis
- †Baiosoma
  - †Baiosoma pala – type locality for species
- Bairdia
  - †Bairdia guadalupiana – type locality for species
  - †Bairdia permiana – type locality for species
  - †Bairdia plebeia – or unidentified related form
  - †Bairdia pruniseminata – type locality for species
  - †Bairdia rhomboidalis – type locality for species
  - †Bairdia subfusiformis – type locality for species
  - †Bairdia wordensis – type locality for species
- †Bakevellia
- †Balkoceras – type locality for genus
  - †Balkoceras gracile – type locality for species
- †Bamberina
  - †Bamberina annectens
- †Bamyaniceras
  - †Bamyaniceras knighti
  - †Bamyaniceras simile
- †Barbclabornia
  - †Barbclabornia luedersensis – type locality for species
- †Barnesoceras – type locality for genus
  - †Barnesoceras clavatum – type locality for species
  - †Barnesoceras conosiphonatum – type locality for species
  - †Barnesoceras expansum – type locality for species
  - †Barnesoceras lamellosum – type locality for species
  - †Barnesoceras lentiexpansum – type locality for species
  - †Barnesoceras percurvatum – type locality for species
  - †Barnesoceras transversum – type locality for species
- †Bathyglyptus – type locality for genus
  - †Bathyglyptus theodori – type locality for species
- †Bathymyonia
  - †Bathymyonia nevadensis
- †Bathyurellus
- †Baylea
  - †Baylea delawarensis – type locality for species
  - †Baylea huecoensis – type locality for species
  - †Baylea knighti
  - †Baylea kuesi – type locality for species
  - †Baylea subconstricta
  - †Baylea supercrenata – or unidentified comparable form
  - †Baylea vjatkensis
- †Beecheria
  - †Beecheria chouteauensis
  - †Beecheria elliptica
  - †Beecheria expansa
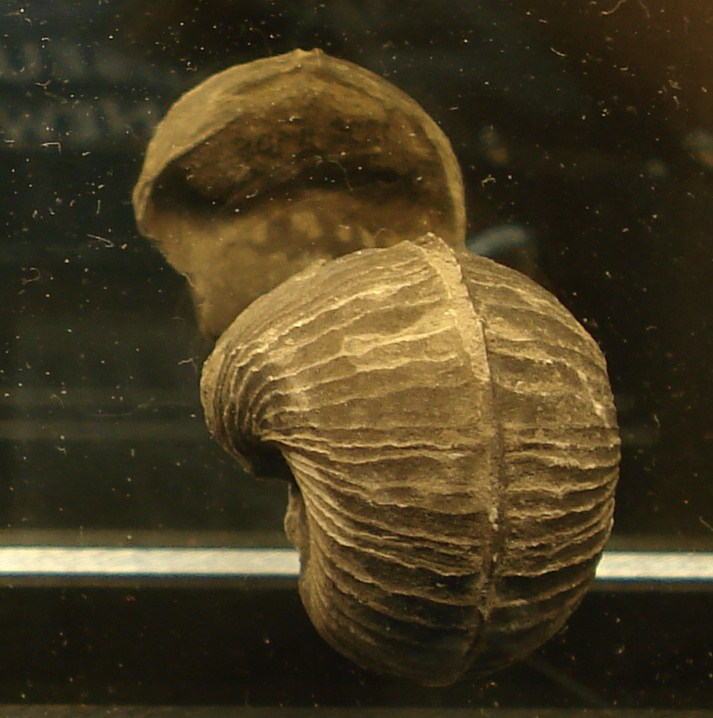
- Fossilized shell of the Silurian-Early Triassic mollusc Bellerophon
  †Bellerophon – tentative report
- †Bellerophon
  - †Bellerophon complanatus – type locality for species
  - †Bellerophon deflectus
  - †Bellerophon graphicus
  - †Bellerophon hilli – type locality for species
  - †Bellerophon huecoensis – type locality for species
  - †Bellerophon kingorum – type locality for species
  - †Bellerophon majusculus
  - †Bellerophon parvicristus – type locality for species
- †Bellerophor
- †Belodella
  - †Belodella silurica
  - †Belodella striata – or unidentified comparable form
- †Beltella
- †Bembexia
- †Biarmeaspira
  - †Biarmeaspira multilineata
- †Bicuerda
  - †Bicuerda columnare – type locality for species
- †Bighornia
  - †Bighornia patella – or unidentified comparable form
- †Bitaunioceras
  - †Bitaunioceras texanum – type locality for species
- †Blountia
  - †Blountia assimilis
  - †Blountia ovata
- †Blountiella
- †Blountina
  - †Blountina westoni – or unidentified related form
- †Boesites
  - †Boesites kingi – type locality for species
  - †Boesites scotti – type locality for species
  - †Boesites texanus – type locality for species
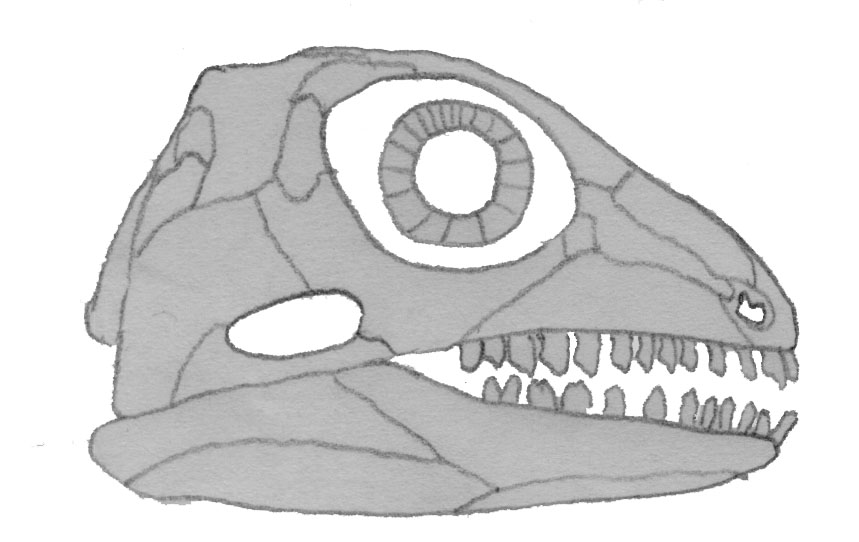
- Illustration of a fossilized skull of the Permian primitive reptile Bolosaurus
  †Bolosaurus – type locality for genus
  - †Bolosaurus major – type locality for species
  - †Bolosaurus striatus – type locality for species
- †Borestus
  - †Borestus magdalenensis – type locality for species
  - †Borestus texanus – type locality for species
- †Bothrionia – type locality for genus
  - †Bothrionia guadalupensis
  - †Bothrionia nasuta – type locality for species
  - †Bothrionia pulchra
  - †Bothrionia transversa – type locality for species
- †Bothrostegium – type locality for genus
  - †Bothrostegium compactum – type locality for species
  - †Bothrostegium derbyoideum
  - †Bothrostegium pusillum
- †Boultonia
  - †Boultonia guadalupensis – type locality for species
- †Bowmanites
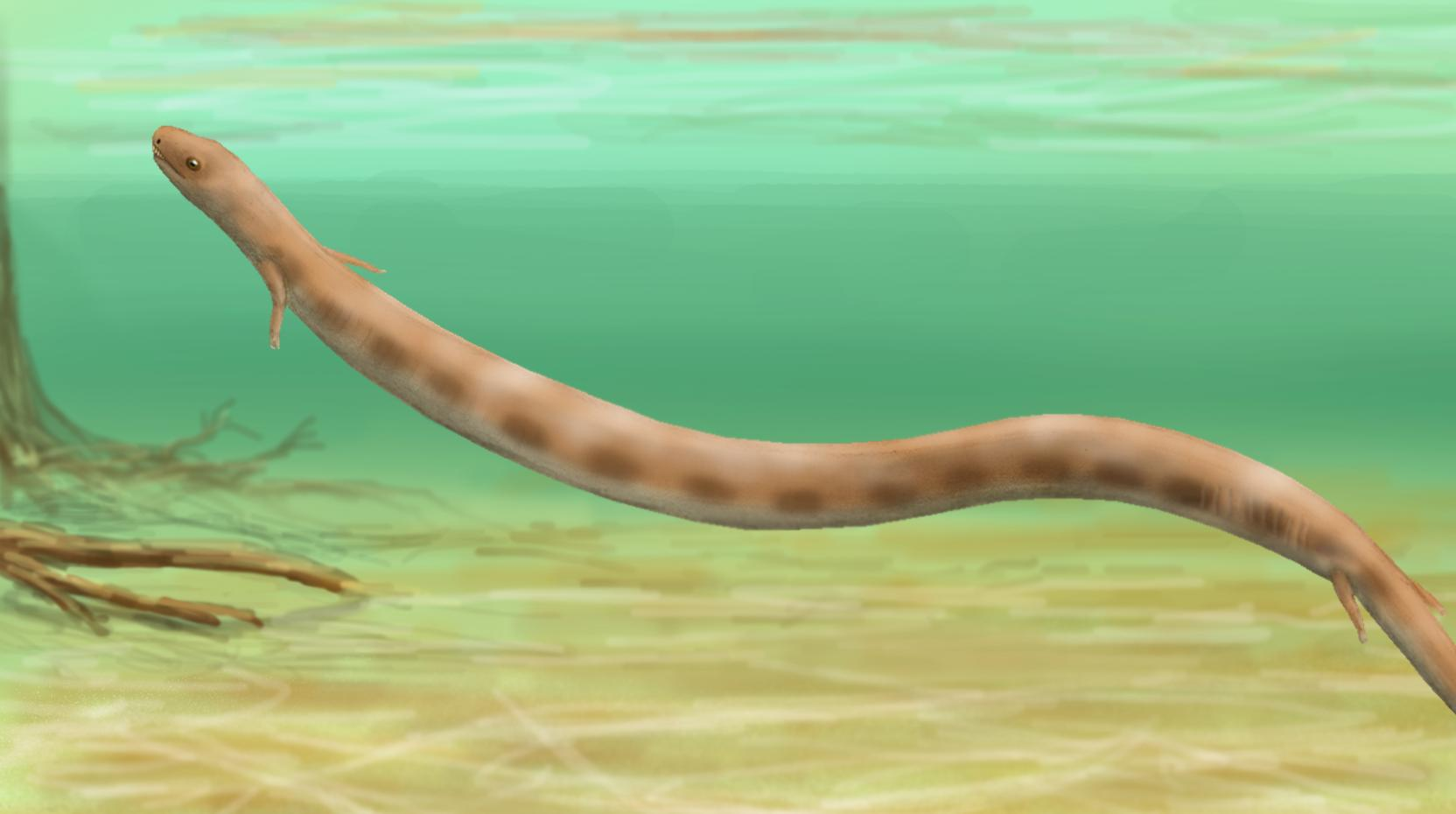
- Life restoration of the Carboniferous amphibian Brachydectes
  †Brachydectes
  - †Brachydectes elongatus
- †Brachydegma
  - †Brachydegma caelatum
- †Brachymetopus – tentative report
  - †Brachymetopus rhinorhachis – type locality for species
- †Brachyphyllum – tentative report
  - †Brachyphyllum densum – type locality for species
- †Brachythyris
  - †Brachythyris chouteauensis
- †Bradyphyllum
  - †Bradyphyllum coagmentum – type locality for species
  - †Bradyphyllum counterseptatum – type locality for species
  - †Bradyphyllum postwannense – type locality for species
- †Branneroceras
  - †Branneroceras branneri
- †Brochidium
  - †Brochidium morrisi – type locality for species
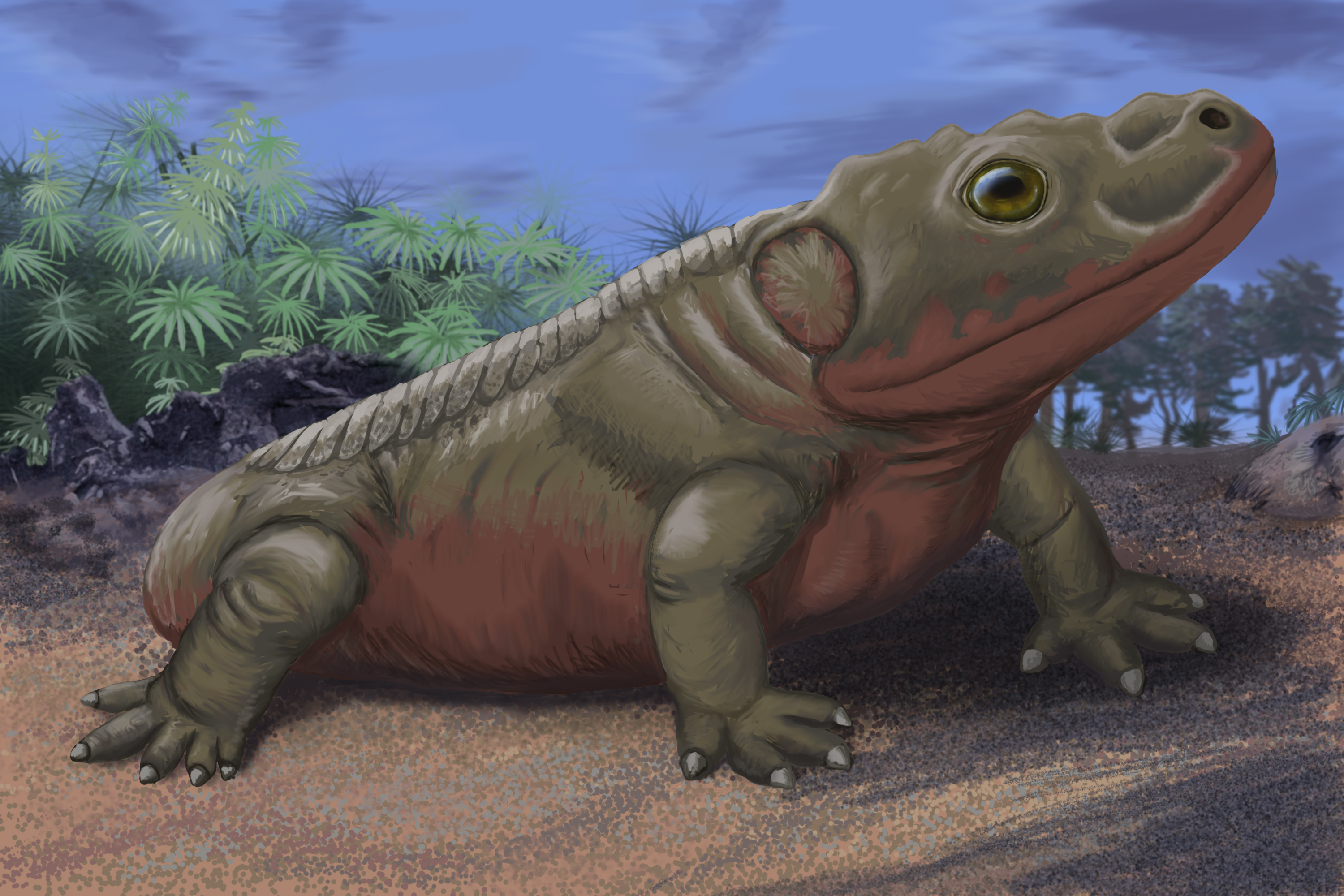
- Life restoration of the Permian amphibian Broiliellus
  †Broiliellus – type locality for genus
  - †Broiliellus arroyoensis – type locality for species
  - †Broiliellus brevis – type locality for species
  - †Broiliellus olsoni – type locality for species
  - †Broiliellus peltatus – type locality for species
  - †Broiliellus texensis – type locality for species
- †Bryograptus
- †Bryorhynchus
  - †Bryorhynchus bisulcatum – type locality for species
  - †Bryorhynchus gratiosum – type locality for species
  - †Bryorhynchus nitidum
  - †Bryorhynchus plicatum
- †Bucanopsis
  - †Bucanopsis type locality for species – informal
- †Buekkella
  - †Buekkella digitata – type locality for species
- †Burenoceras
  - †Burenoceras cornucopia – type locality for species
  - †Burenoceras muricoides – type locality for species
  - †Burenoceras phragmoceroides – type locality for species
- Bythocypris
- †Byzantia – type locality for genus
  - †Byzantia obliqua – type locality for species

== C ==
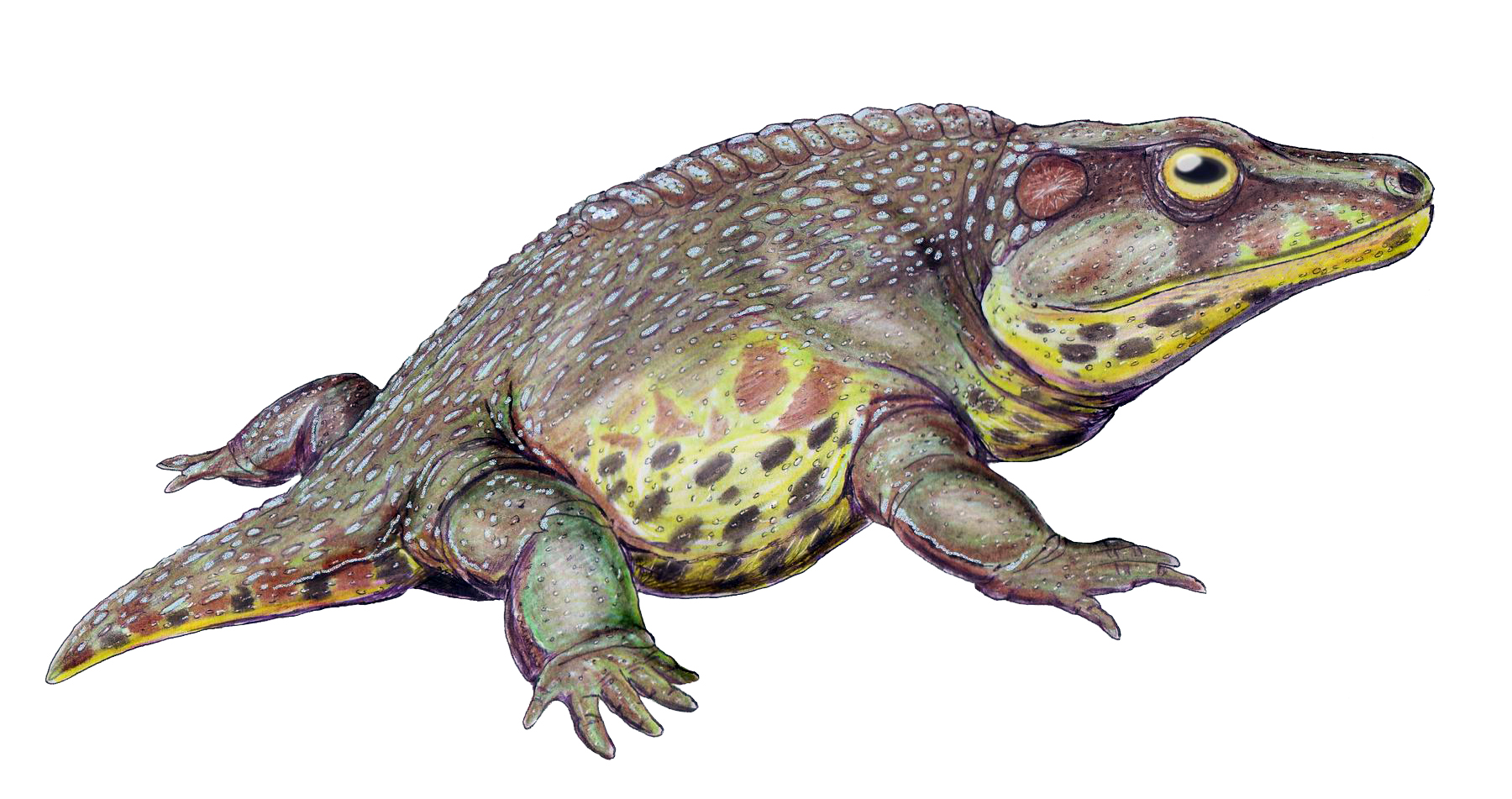
- Life restoration of the Permian amphibian Cacops
  †Cacops
  - †Cacops aspidephorus – type locality for species
- †Cactosteges – type locality for genus
  - †Cactosteges anomalus – type locality for species
- †Calamites
  - †Calamites undulatus
- †Calapoecia
  - †Calapoecia ungava – or unidentified comparable form
- †Calathium
- †Calcivertella
- †Calclamnella
- †Calclyra
  - †Calclyra eiseliana
  - †Calclyra spathulata – type locality for species
  - †Calclyra spinata – type locality for species
  - †Calclyra triangulata – type locality for species
- †Calliprotonia
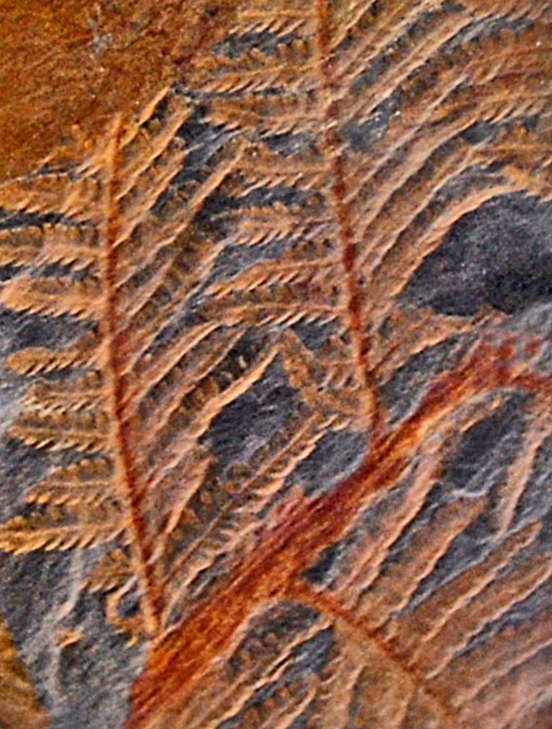
- Fossilized fronds of the Carboniferous seed fern Callipteridium
  †Callipteridium
  - †Callipteridium pteridium – or unidentified comparable form
  - †Callipteridium virginianum
- †Callipteris
  - †Callipteris conferta
  - †Callipteris flabellifera
- †Callispirina
  - †Callispirina rotunda
- †Callistadia – type locality for genus
  - †Callistadia bella – type locality for species
- †Callitomaria
  - †Callitomaria magna – type locality for species
  - †Callitomaria stanislavi
- †Calophyllum – tentative report
- †Calycocoelia
  - †Calycocoelia typicalis
- †Camarelasma
  - †Camarelasma neali
- †Camarophorella
  - †Camarophorella dorsata – type locality for species
- †Camarophorina – tentative report
- †Camarotoechia
- †Campophyllum – tentative report
  - †Campophyllum texanum – type locality for species
- †Camptochiton – type locality for genus
  - †Camptochiton squarrosus – type locality for species
- †Camptonectes – tentative report
- †Cancrinella
  - †Cancrinella boonensis – tentative report
  - †Cancrinella parva
  - †Cancrinella planumbona
  - †Cancrinella sparsispinosa
  - †Cancrinella subquadrata – type locality for species
- †Caneyella
  - †Caneyella wapanuckensis
- †Capillomesolobus
  - †Capillomesolobus permianus
- †Captorhinikos
  - †Captorhinikos chozaensis – type locality for species
  - †Captorhinikos valensis
- †Captorhinoides – type locality for genus
  - †Captorhinoides valensis – type locality for species
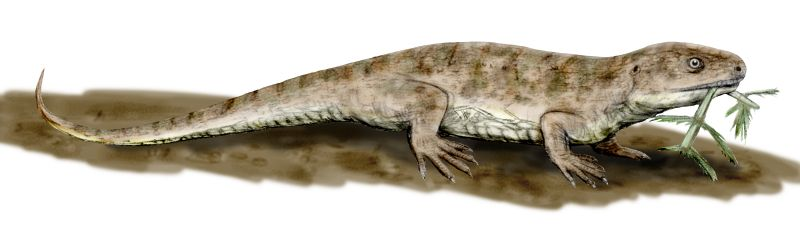
- Life restoration of the Permian reptile Captorhinus
  †Captorhinus – type locality for genus
  - †Captorhinus aguti – type locality for species
  - †Captorhinus laticeps – type locality for species
- †Carbonicola
- †Carbonocoryphe
  - †Carbonocoryphe depressa
  - †Carbonocoryphe planucauda
- †Cardiella
  - †Cardiella electraensis
  - †Cardiella ganti
  - †Cardiella sulcata – type locality for species
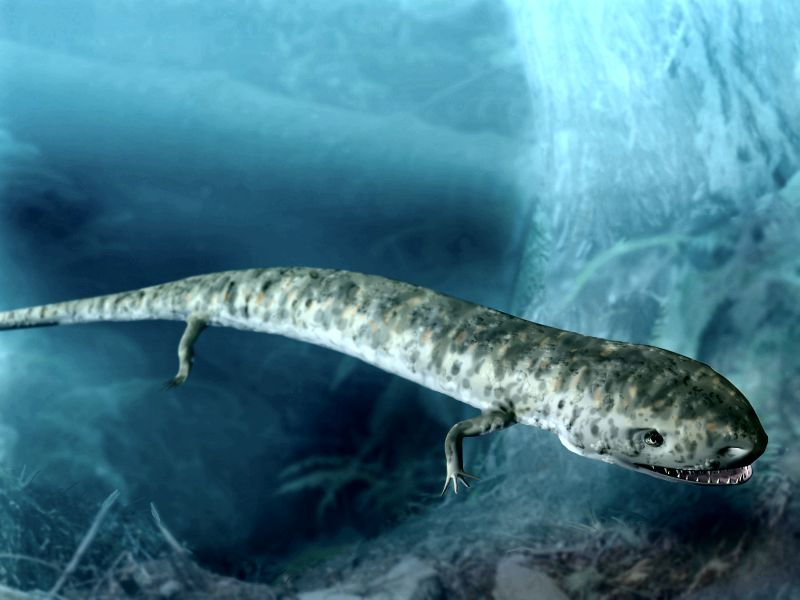
- Life restoration of the Permian amphibian Cardiocephalus
  †Cardiocephalus – type locality for genus
  - †Cardiocephalus sternbergi – type locality for species
- †Cardiomorpha
- †Carphites – type locality for genus
  - †Carphites diabloensis – type locality for species
  - †Carphites plectus
- †Carpolithes
- †Carrolla – type locality for genus
  - †Carrolla craddocki – type locality for species
- †Cartorhium – type locality for genus
  - †Cartorhium chelomatum – type locality for species
  - †Cartorhium coristum
  - †Cartorhium latum – type locality for species
  - †Cartorhium mexicanum – type locality for species
  - †Cartorhium orbiculatum
  - †Cartorhium retusum
  - †Cartorhium vidriense – type locality for species
  - †Cartorhium zoyei – type locality for species
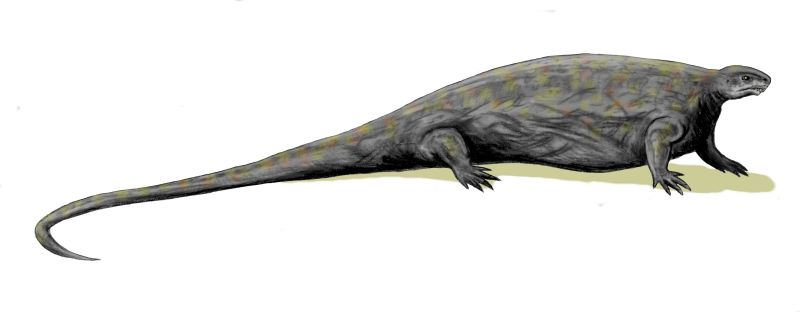
- Life restoration of the Permian synapsid (mammal precursor) Casea
  †Casea – type locality for genus
  - †Casea broilii – type locality for species
  - †Casea halselli – type locality for species
  - †Casea nicholsi – type locality for species
- †Caseoides – type locality for genus
  - †Caseoides sanangeloensis – type locality for species
- †Caseopsis
  - †Caseopsis agilis – type locality for species
- †Cassianoides – type locality for genus
  - †Cassianoides kingorum – type locality for species
- †Cassiavellia – type locality for genus
  - †Cassiavellia galtarae – type locality for species
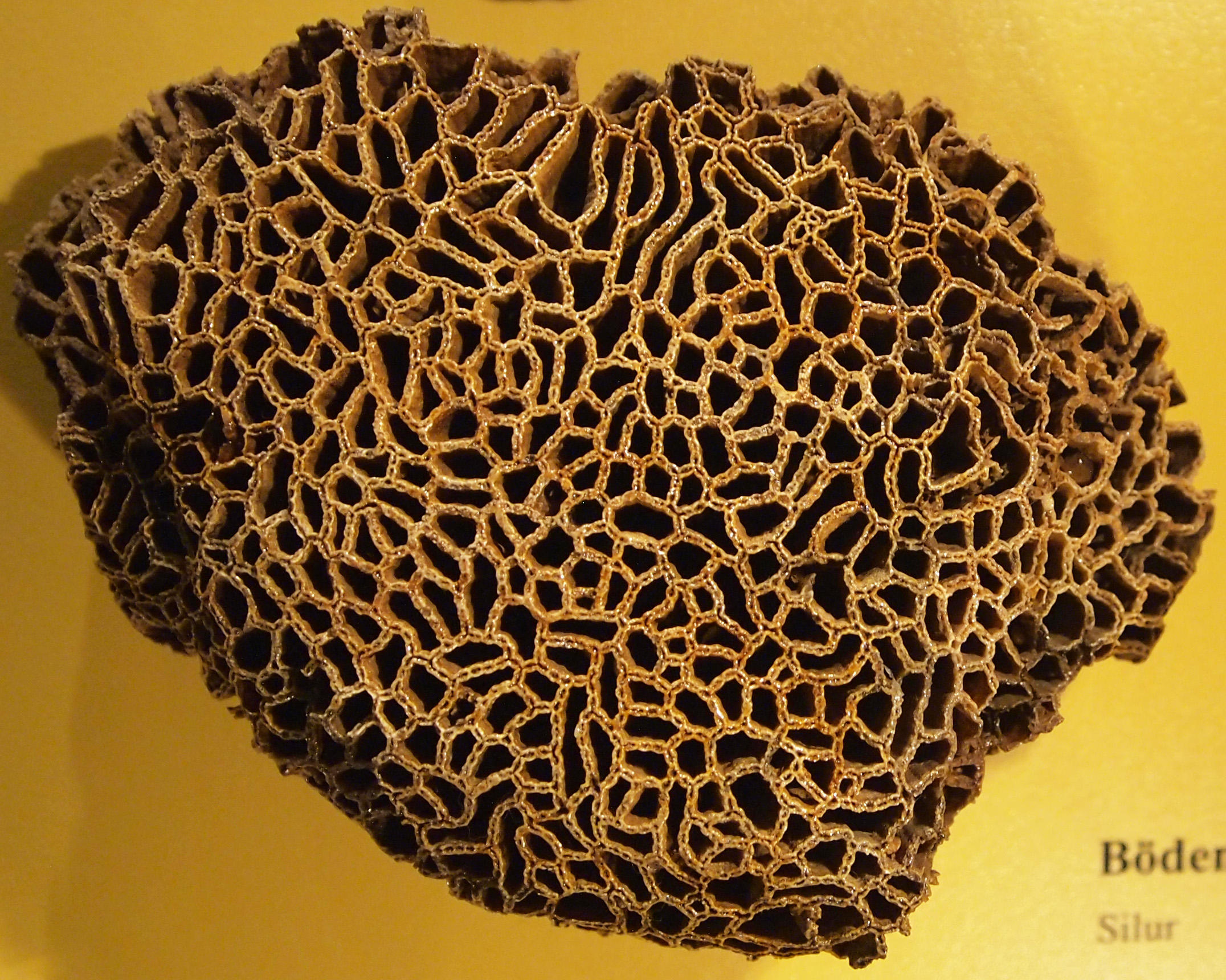
- Fossil of the Ordovician-Silurian tabulate coral Catenipora
  †Catenipora
  - †Catenipora workmanae – type locality for species
- †Catenispongia – type locality for genus
  - †Catenispongia agaricus – type locality for species
- †Cathaysiopteris
  - †Cathaysiopteris yochelsonii – type locality for species
- †Catoraphiceras
- †Cavellina
  - †Cavellina ellipticalis – type locality for species
  - †Cavellina nebrascensis
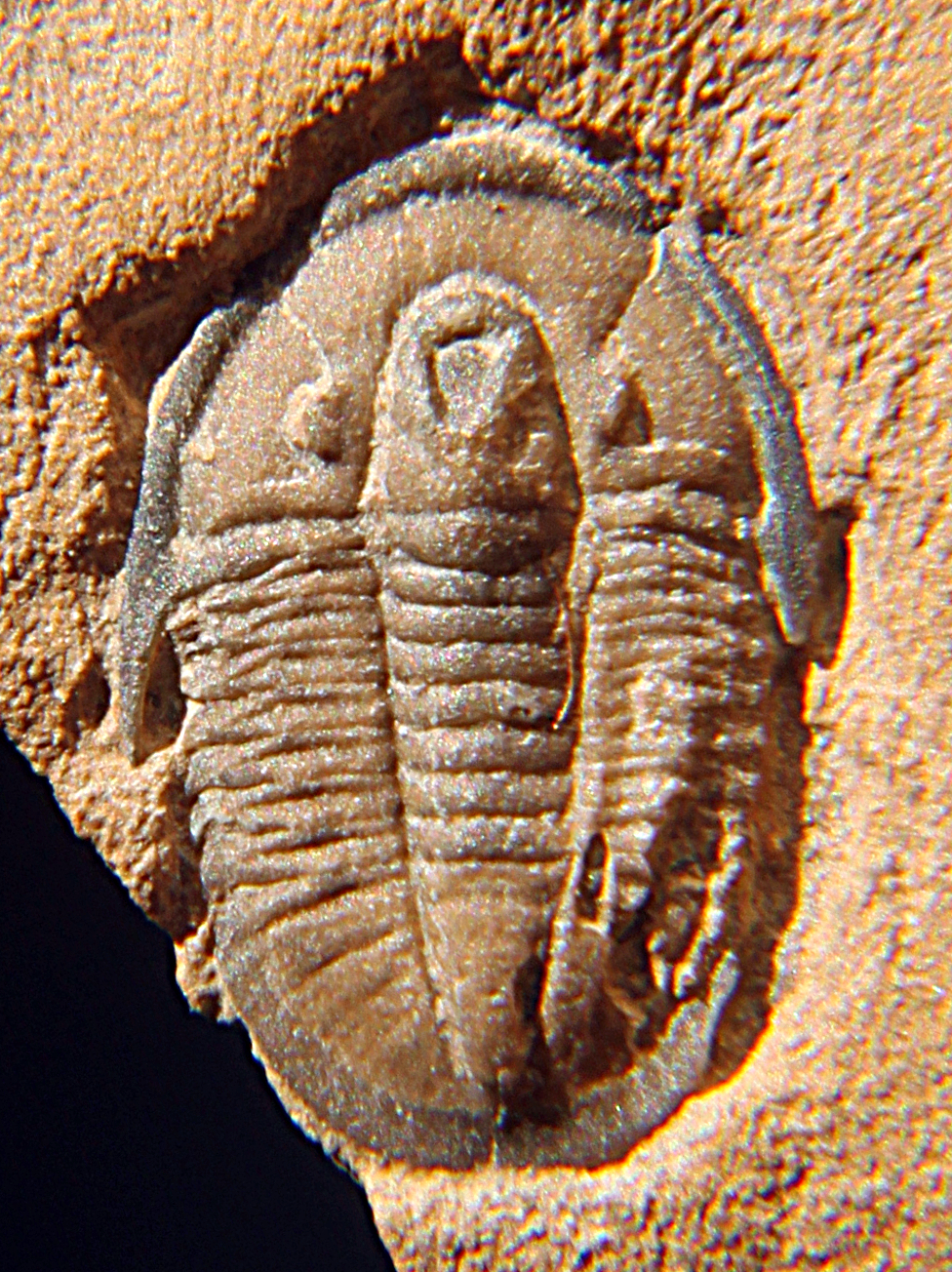
- Fossil of the Cambrian trilobite Cedaria
  †Cedaria
  - †Cedaria gaspensis – or unidentified comparable form
- †Cenorhynchia – type locality for genus
  - †Cenorhynchia atmeta
  - †Cenorhynchia camerata
  - †Cenorhynchia fracida – type locality for species
  - †Cenorhynchia hebata
  - †Cenorhynchia mitigata
  - †Cenorhynchia nasuta
  - †Cenorhynchia parvula – type locality for species
  - †Cenorhynchia pentagonalis
  - †Cenorhynchia saginata – type locality for species
  - †Cenorhynchia transversa
  - †Cenorhynchia triangulata – type locality for species
  - †Cenorhynchia ventricosa
- †Centrotarphyceras
  - †Centrotarphyceras longicameratum
- †Ceratobairdia – type locality for genus
  - †Ceratobairdia dorsospinosa – type locality for species
- †Ceratopea
  - †Ceratopea capuliformis
  - †Ceratopea hami – or unidentified comparable form
  - †Ceratopea incurvata
  - †Ceratopea lemonei – type locality for species
  - †Ceratopea unguis – or unidentified comparable form
- †Ceraunocochlis
  - †Ceraunocochlis deformis – type locality for species
  - †Ceraunocochlis elongata – type locality for species
  - †Ceraunocochlis kidderi
  - †Ceraunocochlis trekensis – type locality for species
- †Chaeniorhynchus – type locality for genus
  - †Chaeniorhynchus inauris
  - †Chaeniorhynchus salutare
  - †Chaeniorhynchus transversum – type locality for species
- †Chaenomya – tentative report
- †Chaetetes
  - †Chaetetes mackrothii – tentative report
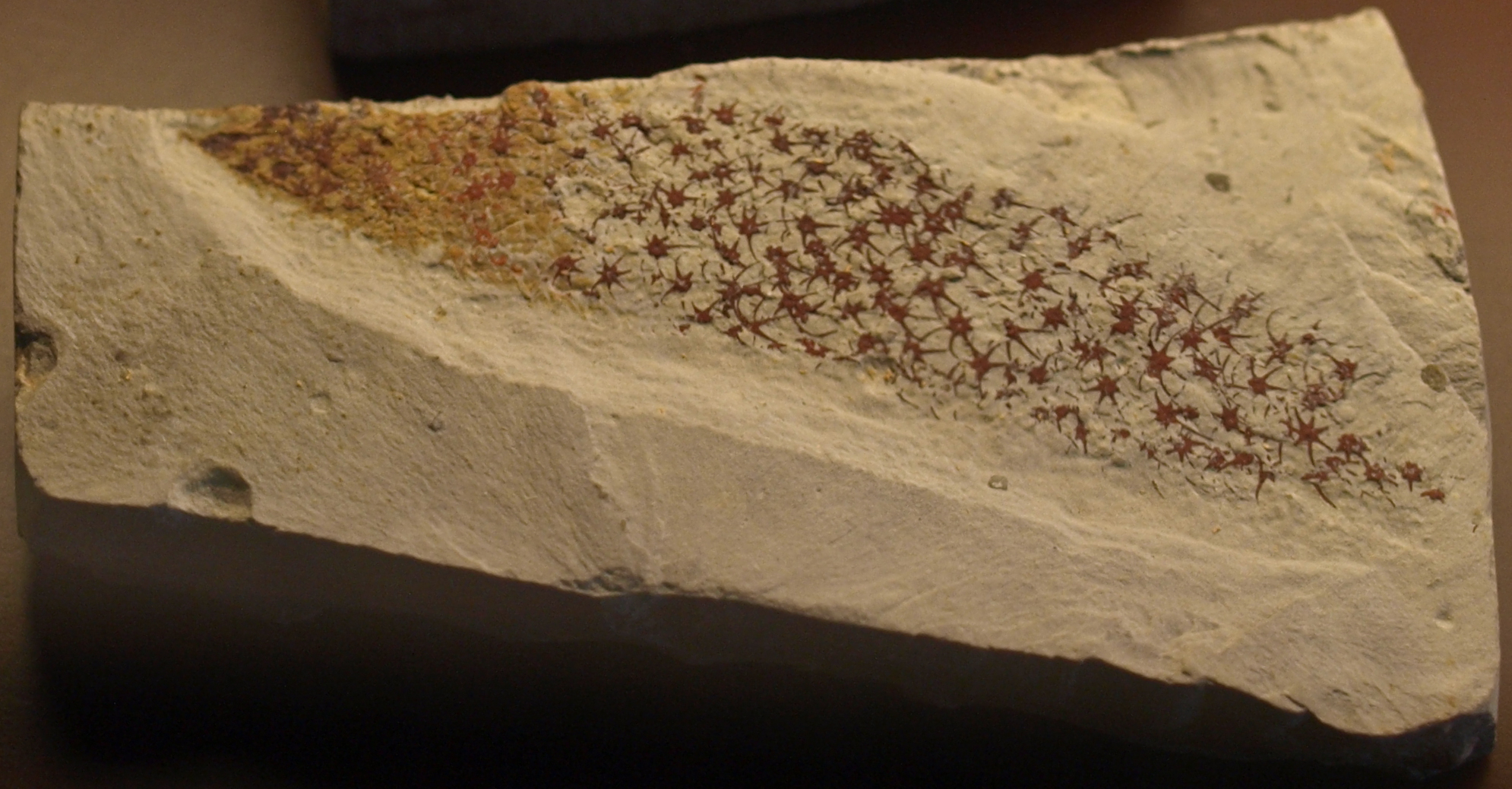
- Chancelloria
  †Chancelloria – tentative report
- †Chauliochiton – type locality for genus
  - †Chauliochiton knighti – type locality for species
- †Chaunactis
- †Cheiropyge
  - †Cheiropyge koizumii – or unidentified comparable form
- †Chelononia
  - †Chelononia neali
  - †Chelononia straminea – type locality for species
- †Chiastocolumnia – type locality for genus
  - †Chiastocolumnia cylindrica – type locality for species
- †Choanodus – type locality for genus
  - †Choanodus anomalus
  - †Choanodus irregularis – type locality for species
  - †Choanodus perfectus – type locality for species
- †Choctawites
  - †Choctawites choctawensis
  - †Choctawites cumminsi
- †Chondronia – type locality for genus
  - †Chondronia bella – type locality for species
  - †Chondronia ningula – type locality for species
  - †Chondronia obesa
  - †Chondronia ovalis – type locality for species
  - †Chondronia parva
  - †Chondronia rectimarginata
- †Chonetella
  - †Chonetella flemingi
- †Chonetes
  - †Chonetes flemingi – tentative report
  - †Chonetes permianus
  - †Chonetes verneuilianus
- †Chonetinella
  - †Chonetinella biplicata
  - †Chonetinella ciboloensis
  - †Chonetinella crassiparva
  - †Chonetinella gerontica
  - †Chonetinella parva
  - †Chonetinella spinolirata – type locality for species
- †Chonetinetes
  - †Chonetinetes angustisulcatus
  - †Chonetinetes reversus – type locality for species
  - †Chonetinetes varians
- †Chonosteges
  - †Chonosteges costellatus – type locality for species
  - †Chonosteges limbatus
  - †Chonosteges magnicostatus – type locality for species
  - †Chonosteges matutinus
  - †Chonosteges multicostatus
  - †Chonosteges pulcher
  - †Chonosteges variabilis – type locality for species
- †Cibecuia
  - †Cibecuia gouldii – type locality for species
- †Cibolites – type locality for genus
  - †Cibolites uddeni – type locality for species
- †Cibolocrinus – type locality for genus
  - †Cibolocrinus erectus – type locality for species
  - †Cibolocrinus typus – type locality for species
- †Cinclidonema – type locality for genus
  - †Cinclidonema texanum – type locality for species
- †Cladopora – report made of unidentified related form or using admittedly obsolete nomenclature
  - †Cladopora spinulata
  - †Cladopora tubulata
- †Clarkoceras
  - †Clarkoceras luthei – or unidentified related form
- †Clavallus
  - †Clavallus spicaudina
- †Cleidophorus – report made of unidentified related form or using admittedly obsolete nomenclature
  - †Cleidophorus delawarensis
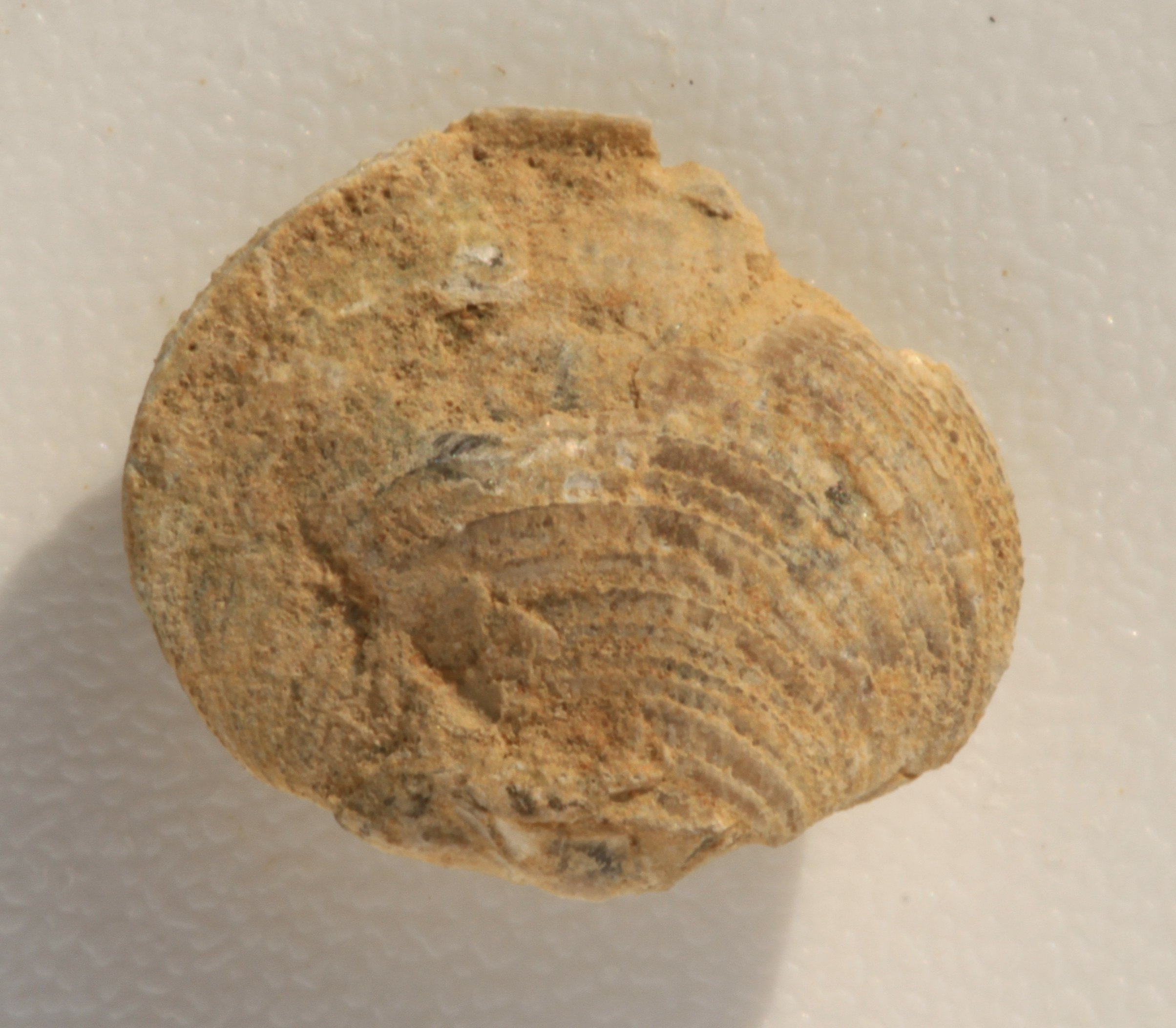
- Fossilized shell of the Middle Devonian-Permian brachiopod Cleiothyridina
  †Cleiothyridina
  - †Cleiothyridina mulsa
  - †Cleiothyridina nana
  - †Cleiothyridina pilularis
  - †Cleiothyridina prouti – or unidentified comparable form
  - †Cleiothyridina rara
  - †Cleiothyridina rectimarginata – type locality for species
  - †Cleiothyridina tenuilineata
- †Clelandoceras – tentative report
  - †Clelandoceras rarum – type locality for species
- †Climacograptus
  - †Climacograptus nevadensis
  - †Climacograptus tubuliferus
- †Clinodomia
  - †Clinodomia obstipa
- †Clinolobus
  - †Clinolobus type locality for species – informal
- †Clinopistha – tentative report
  - †Clinopistha levis – or unidentified comparable form
- †Clistoceras
- †Clitendoceras
- †Clonograptus
- †Cluthoceras
- †Coccoseris
  - †Coccoseris astomata – type locality for species
- †Codonofusiella
  - †Codonofusiella paradoxica
- †Coelocladia
  - †Coelocladia spinosa
- †Coelocladiella – type locality for genus
  - †Coelocladiella lissa
  - †Coelocladiella philoconcha – type locality for species
- †Coelogasteroceras
  - †Coelogasteroceras mexicanum
- †Coenocystis – type locality for genus
  - †Coenocystis richardsoni – type locality for species
- †Coledium
  - †Coledium altisulcatum – type locality for species
  - †Coledium costatulum – type locality for species
  - †Coledium evexum
  - †Coledium undulatum
  - †Coledium vadosulcatum – type locality for species
- †Collatipora – type locality for genus
  - †Collatipora delicata
  - †Collatipora discreta – type locality for species
  - †Collatipora pyriformis
- †Collemataria – type locality for genus
  - †Collemataria americana
  - †Collemataria batilliformis
  - †Collemataria elongata – type locality for species
  - †Collemataria gregaria – type locality for species
  - †Collemataria irregularis – type locality for species
  - †Collemataria marshalli
  - †Collemataria platys – type locality for species
  - †Collemataria spatulata
- †Collumatus
  - †Collumatus solitarius
- †Colospongia
  - †Colospongia americana
  - †Colospongia benjamini
- †Colospongiella – type locality for genus
  - †Colospongiella permiana – type locality for species
- †Colpites
  - †Colpites minutus
  - †Colpites monilifera
  - †Colpites striata
- †Comia
- †Complexisporites – type locality for genus
  - †Complexisporites polymorphus – type locality for species
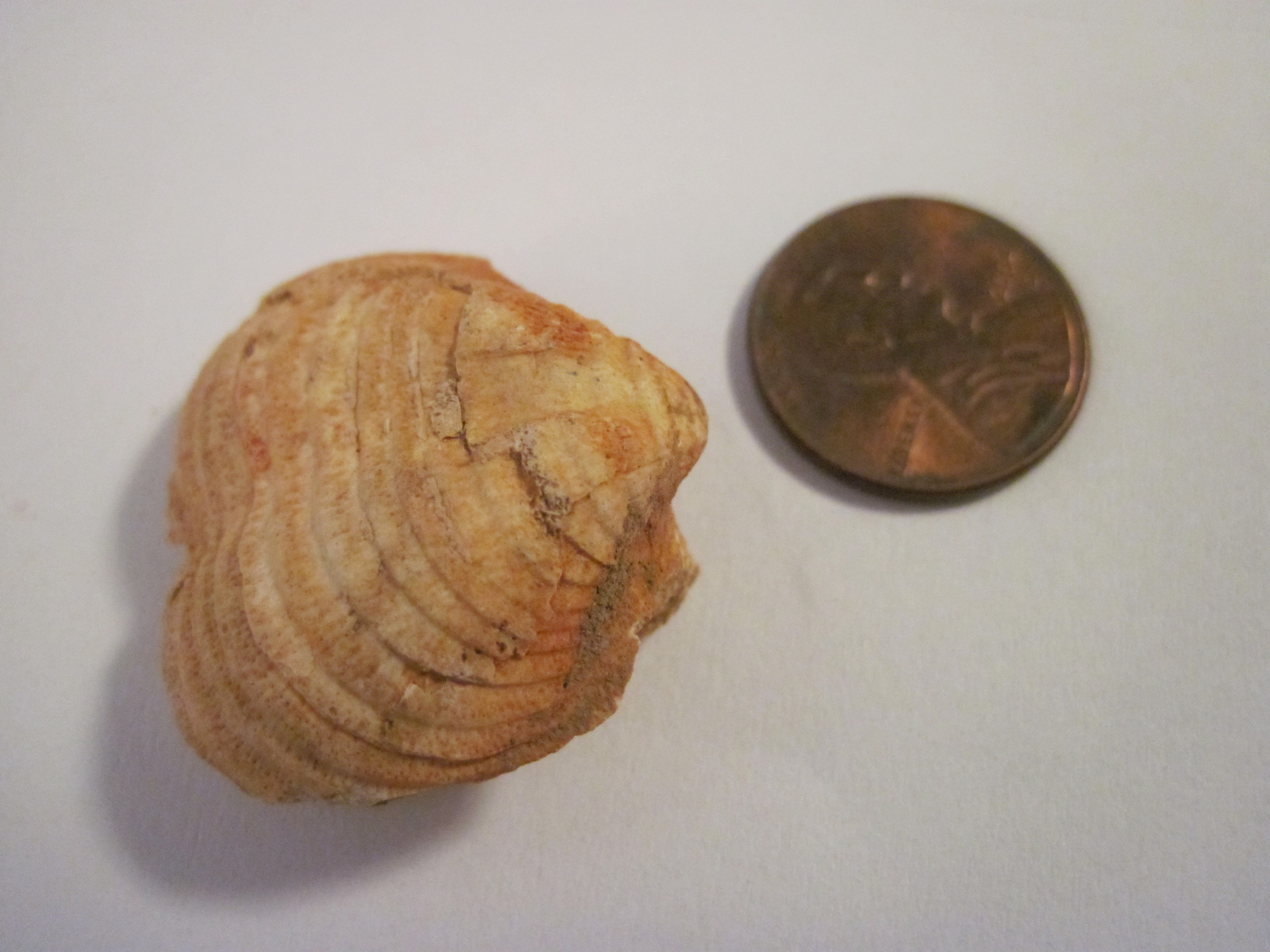
- Fossilized shell of the Late Devonian-Permian brachiopod Composita
  †Composita
  - †Composita affinis
  - †Composita apheles – type locality for species
  - †Composita apsidata
  - †Composita bucculenta – type locality for species
  - †Composita costata
  - †Composita cracens
  - †Composita crassa – type locality for species
  - †Composita discina
  - †Composita emarginata
  - †Composita enormis – type locality for species
  - †Composita imbricata – type locality for species
  - †Composita mexicana
  - †Composita mira
  - †Composita nucella
  - †Composita ovata
  - †Composita parasulcata – type locality for species
  - †Composita persinuata
  - †Composita pilula
  - †Composita prospera
  - †Composita pyriformis
  - †Composita quantilla
  - †Composita stalagmium
  - †Composita strongyle – type locality for species
  - †Composita subcircularis
  - †Composita subtilita
- †Compressoproductus
  - †Compressoproductus acuminatus
  - †Compressoproductus concentricus
  - †Compressoproductus curtus – type locality for species
  - †Compressoproductus flabellatus
  - †Compressoproductus parvus
  - †Compressoproductus pinniformis
  - †Compressoproductus rarus – type locality for species
  - †Compressoproductus thomasi – type locality for species
- †Condrathyris
  - †Condrathyris perplexa
- †Conjunctio
- †Conocardium – tentative report
- †Conocerina
  - †Conocerina brevis – or unidentified comparable form
  - †Conocerina unguloides – type locality for species
- †Cooleyella
  - †Cooleyella amazonensis
  - †Cooleyella duffini – type locality for species
- †Cooperaria – type locality for genus
  - †Cooperaria getawayensis – type locality for species
- †Coopericus
  - †Coopericus angustus – type locality for species
  - †Coopericus semisulcatus
  - †Coopericus undatus
- †Cooperina
  - †Cooperina inexpectata
  - †Cooperina parva – type locality for species
  - †Cooperina subcuneata
  - †Cooperina triangulata
- †Cooperoceras – type locality for genus
  - †Cooperoceras texanum – type locality for species
- †Coosella
  - †Coosella beltensis
  - †Coosella granulosa
  - †Coosella widnerensis – or unidentified comparable form
- †Coosia
  - †Coosia pernamagna
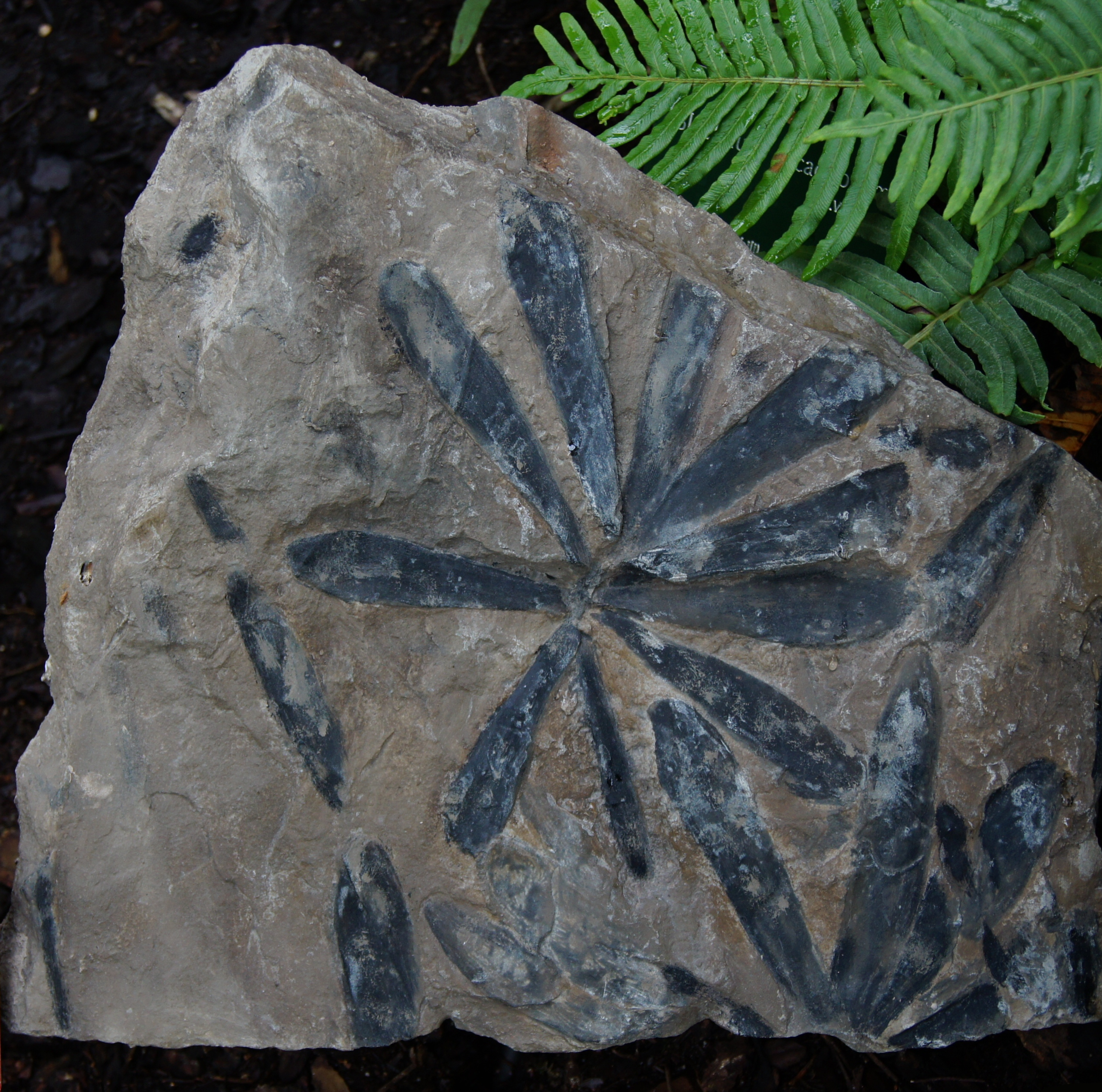
- Fossilized foliage of the Carboniferous-Permian conifer relative Cordaites
  †Cordaites
  - †Cordaites principalis
- †Coronakirkbya – type locality for genus
  - †Coronakirkbya fimbriata – type locality for species
- †Coryellina
  - †Coryellina indicata – type locality for species
- †Coryssochiton – type locality for genus
  - †Coryssochiton parallelus – type locality for species
- †Coscinophora – type locality for genus
  - †Coscinophora hortoni
  - †Coscinophora magnifica – type locality for species
  - †Coscinophora monilifera – type locality for species
  - †Coscinophora nodosa – type locality for species
- †Costatumulus
  - †Costatumulus distortus
  - †Costatumulus expansa – type locality for species
  - †Costatumulus fragosa
  - †Costatumulus villiersi
- †Costellarina – type locality for genus
  - †Costellarina costellata – type locality for species
- †Costiferina
  - †Costiferina indica
- †Costispinifera
  - †Costispinifera costata – type locality for species
  - †Costispinifera rugatula
  - †Costispinifera walcottiana
- †Cotteroceras
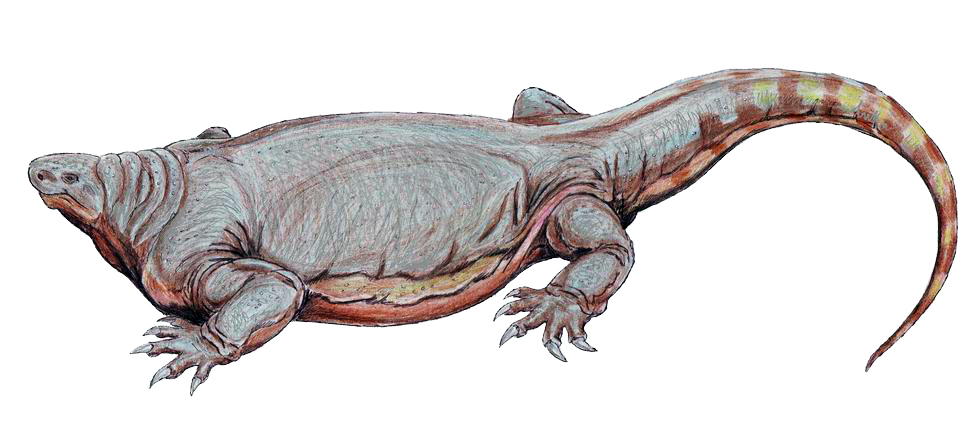
- Life restoration of the Permian synapsid (mammal precursor) Cotylorhynchus
  †Cotylorhynchus
  - †Cotylorhynchus hancocki – type locality for species
- †Cranaena
  - †Cranaena dorsisulcata – type locality for species
  - †Cranaena hannibalensis – or unidentified comparable form
  - †Cranaena texana – type locality for species
- Crania
  - †Crania permiana – type locality for species
- †Craspedona
  - †Craspedona limbata – type locality for species
  - †Craspedona newelli
- †Crassumbo – type locality for genus
  - †Crassumbo inornatus – type locality for species
  - †Crassumbo turgidus – type locality for species
- †Cravenoceras – tentative report
- †Crenispirifer
  - †Crenispirifer angulatus – type locality for species
  - †Crenispirifer effrenus
  - †Crenispirifer jubatus
  - †Crenispirifer myllus
  - †Crenispirifer sagus
- †Crenulites – type locality for genus
  - †Crenulites duncanae – type locality for species
  - †Crenulites magnus – type locality for species
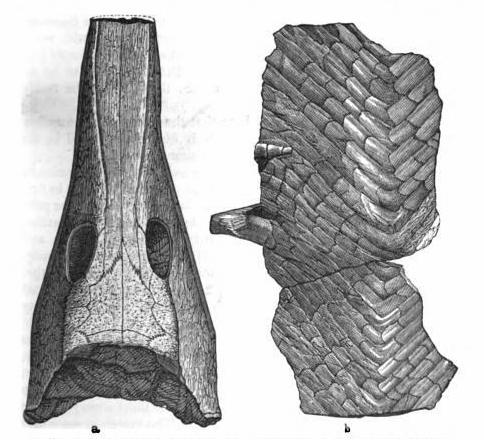
- Illustration of a fossilized skull and ventral scutes of the Carboniferous-Permian reptile relative Cricotus. Edward Drinker Cope (1884).
  †Cricotus
  - †Cricotus crassidiscus – type locality for species
- †Crimites
  - †Crimites glomulus – tentative report
  - †Crimites type locality for species – informal
- †Cromyocrinus
  - †Cromyocrinus grandis – or unidentified comparable form
- †Crossotelos
  - †Crossotelos annulatus
- †Cruricella
  - †Cruricella minutalis – type locality for species
- †Crurithyris
  - †Crurithyris inflata
  - †Crurithyris longirostris
  - †Crurithyris major
  - †Crurithyris parva
  - †Crurithyris planoconvexa
  - †Crurithyris sulcata
- †Cryptacanthia
  - †Cryptacanthia glabra
- †Ctenacanthus
  - †Ctenacanthus amblyxiphias – type locality for species
- †Ctenalosia – type locality for genus
  - †Ctenalosia fixata – type locality for species
  - †Ctenalosia primitiva
  - †Ctenalosia rotunda
- †Ctenoptychius
- †Ctenospondylus – type locality for genus
  - †Ctenospondylus casei – type locality for species
- †Cullisonia
  - †Cullisonia producta
- †Culmitzschia
- †Culunama
  - †Culunama bellistiata
- †Cuniculocystis – type locality for genus
  - †Cuniculocystis floweri – type locality for species
- †Cupularostrum – tentative report
- †Cyathophylloides
  - †Cyathophylloides burksae – type locality for species
- †Cycadospadix
- †Cyclacantharia
  - †Cyclacantharia gigantea
  - †Cyclacantharia kingorum – type locality for species
  - †Cyclacantharia paucispinosa – type locality for species
  - †Cyclacantharia robusta
  - †Cyclacantharia transitoria – type locality for species
- †Cyclites
  - †Cyclites costatus – type locality for species
  - †Cyclites multilineata – type locality for species
- †Cyclobathmus
  - †Cyclobathmus haworthi
- †Cylicioscapha
  - †Cylicioscapha texana – type locality for species
  - †Cylicioscapha williamsi – type locality for species
- †Cylindritopsis
  - †Cylindritopsis hamiltonae – type locality for species
  - †Cylindritopsis insolitus
  - †Cylindritopsis spheroides – type locality for species
  - †Cylindritopsis vaningeni
- †Cymatospira
  - †Cymatospira montfortianus
- †Cyphotalosia – type locality for genus
  - †Cyphotalosia masonensis – type locality for species
- †Cypricardinia – tentative report
  - †Cypricardinia contracta – type locality for species
- †Cyptendoceras
  - †Cyptendoceras richardsoni – type locality for species
- †Cyrtina
  - †Cyrtina burlingtonensis
- †Cyrtorostra
  - †Cyrtorostra varicostata
- †Cystothalamia – type locality for genus
  - †Cystothalamia guadalupensis – type locality for species
  - †Cystothalamia megacysta
  - †Cystothalamia nodulifera

== D ==
- †Dactylites
  - †Dactylites magna – type locality for species
  - †Dactylites micropora – type locality for species
  - †Dactylites obconica – type locality for species
  - †Dactylites subdigitatus – type locality for species
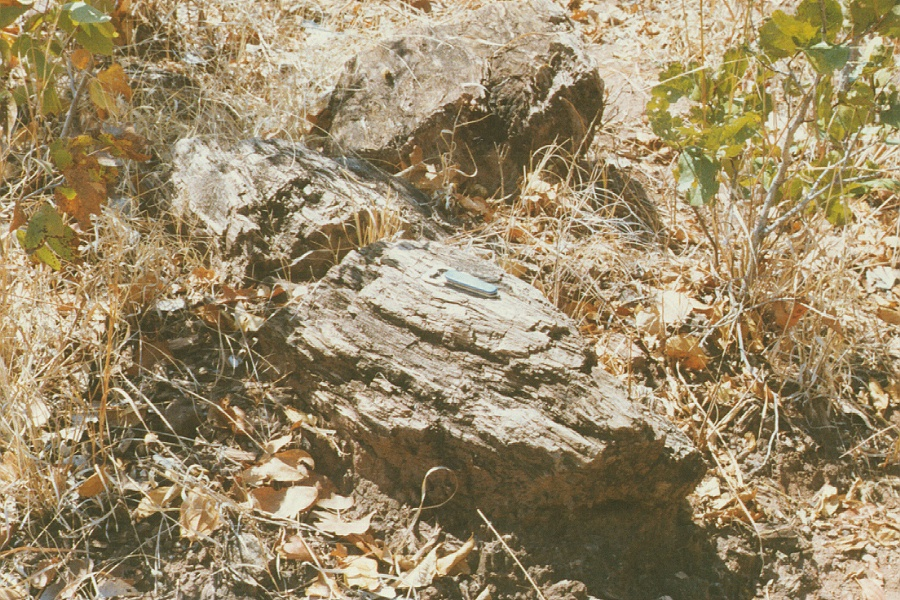
- Fossil of the Carboniferous-Late Cretaceous petrified conifer wood morphogenus Dadoxylon
  †Dadoxylon
- †Daharella
  - †Daharella crassa – type locality for species
  - †Daharella pattersonia – type locality for species
  - †Daharella ramosa
- †Daixites
  - †Daixites meglitskyi – or unidentified comparable form
- †Dakeoceras – tentative report
  - †Dakeoceras mutabile – type locality for species
- †Danaeites
- †Dapsilodus
  - †Dapsilodus obliquicostatus
  - †Dapsilodus praecipuus
  - †Dapsilodus sparsus
- †Daraelites
  - †Daraelites leonardensis – type locality for species
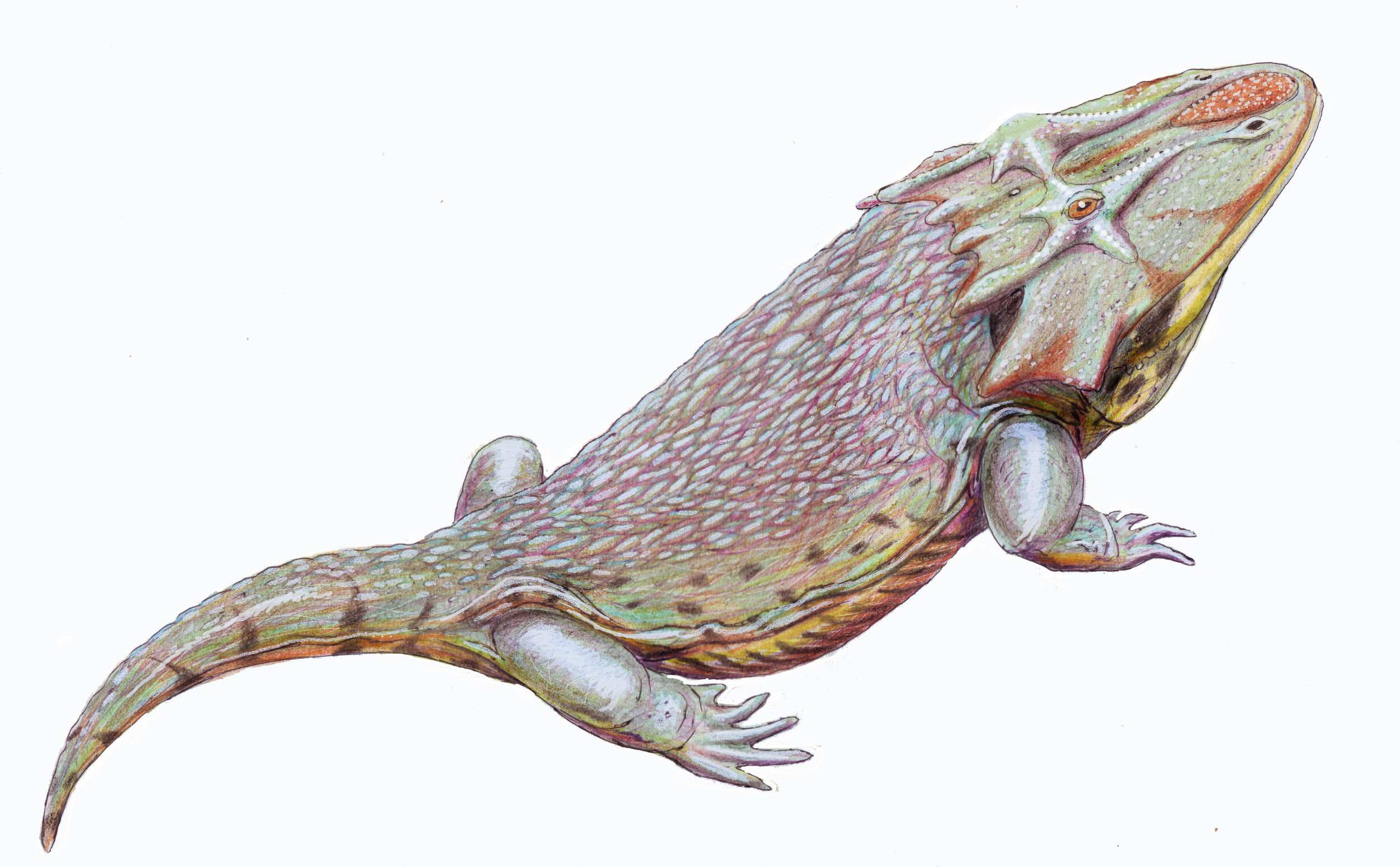
- Restoration of the Permian amphibian Dasyceps
  †Dasyceps
  - †Dasyceps microphthalmus – type locality for species
- †Dasysaria
  - †Dasysaria inca
  - †Dasysaria undulata
  - †Dasysaria wolfcampensis – type locality for species
- †Dateroceras
- †Daubreeia
- †Decoriconus
  - †Decoriconus fragilis
- †Defordia
  - †Defordia defuncta
  - †Defordia densa – type locality for species
  - †Defordia lobata
- †Deiracephalus
  - †Deiracephalus aster
- †Delaria
  - †Delaria antiqua
  - †Delaria brevis – type locality for species
  - †Delaria chinatiensis – type locality for species
  - †Delaria granti – type locality for species
  - †Delaria westexensis – type locality for species
- †Delnortea
  - †Delnortea abbotiae
  - †Delnortea abbottiae
- †Delocrinus
  - †Delocrinus hemisphericus
  - †Delocrinus pictus
  - †Delocrinus subhemisphericus
- †Deltarina
  - †Deltarina magnicostata
- †Deltopecten
- †Demarezites
- †Dendropupa
  - †Dendropupa vetusta
- †Densonella
- Dentalium
- †Derbyia
  - †Derbyia bella
  - †Derbyia bennetti – or unidentified comparable form
  - †Derbyia buchi
  - †Derbyia carteri
  - †Derbyia cincinnata – type locality for species
  - †Derbyia ciscoensis – tentative report
  - †Derbyia complicata – type locality for species
  - †Derbyia crassa
  - †Derbyia crenulata
  - †Derbyia cymbula
  - †Derbyia elevata
  - †Derbyia filosa – type locality for species
  - †Derbyia informis – type locality for species
  - †Derbyia laqueata – type locality for species
  - †Derbyia multistriata – tentative report
  - †Derbyia nasuta
  - †Derbyia pannucia – type locality for species
  - †Derbyia profunda
  - †Derbyia scitula
  - †Derbyia strophomenoidea
  - †Derbyia sulcata
  - †Derbyia texta – type locality for species
  - †Derbyia wabaunseensis – tentative report
- †Derbyoides
  - †Derbyoides dunbari
  - †Derbyoides marathonensis
- †Dermospheroidalis – type locality for genus
  - †Dermospheroidalis irregularis – type locality for species
- †Desmoinsea
- †Diaboloceras
  - †Diaboloceras varicostatum
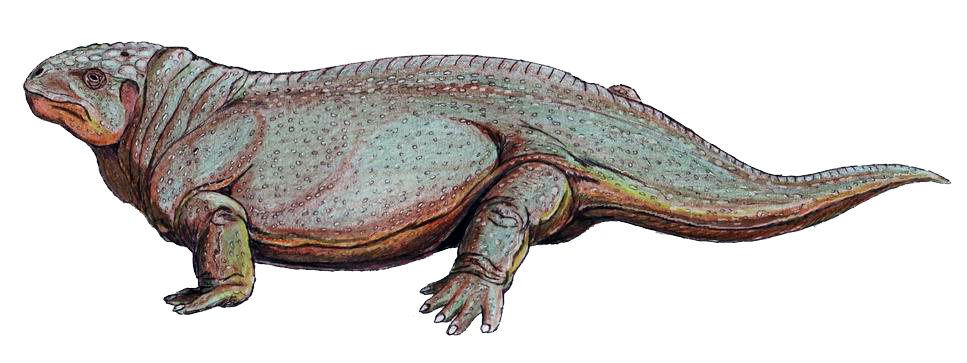
- Life restoration of the Permian reptile relative Diadectes
  †Diadectes – type locality for genus
  - †Diadectes sideropelicus – type locality for species
  - †Diadectes tenuitectes – type locality for species
- †Diaphelasma
  - †Diaphelasma oklahomense
- †Dibunophyllum
  - †Dibunophyllum moorei
  - †Dibunophyllum uddeni – type locality for species
- †Dicellograptus
  - †Dicellograptus ornatus
- †Diceromyonia
  - †Diceromyonia crassa – type locality for species
- †Dichostasia
  - †Dichostasia complex – type locality for species
  - †Dichostasia simplex – type locality for species
- †Dicksonites
- †Dicranophyllum
- †Dictyoclostus
  - †Dictyoclostus semireticulatus – tentative report
- †Dictyotomaria
  - †Dictyotomaria euglyphea – type locality for species
  - †Dictyotomaria scitula
  - †Dictyotomaria type locality for species – informal
- †Didymodus
  - †Didymodus platypternus
- †Dielasma
  - †Dielasma adamanteum – type locality for species
  - †Dielasma anterolatum
  - †Dielasma bellulum
  - †Dielasma bovidens
  - †Dielasma compactum – type locality for species
  - †Dielasma cordatum – type locality for species
  - †Dielasma diabloense
  - †Dielasma ellipsoideum – type locality for species
  - †Dielasma emarginatum – type locality for species
  - †Dielasma expansum – type locality for species
  - †Dielasma gracile – type locality for species
  - †Dielasma hessense
  - †Dielasma labiatum
  - †Dielasma ligonorum
  - †Dielasma longisulcatum
  - †Dielasma microrhynchum
  - †Dielasma obesum – type locality for species
  - †Dielasma perplexum – type locality for species
  - †Dielasma pictile
  - †Dielasma planidorsatum – type locality for species
  - †Dielasma prolongatum
  - †Dielasma pygmaeum
  - †Dielasma rigbyi
  - †Dielasma shafterense – type locality for species
  - †Dielasma spatulatum
  - †Dielasma subcirculare
  - †Dielasma subcylindricum
  - †Dielasma sulcatum – type locality for species
  - †Dielasma uniplicatum
  - †Dielasma zebratum – type locality for species
- †Dielasmella
  - †Dielasmella larga – type locality for species
- †Diffingia – type locality for genus
  - †Diffingia coita – type locality for species
  - †Diffingia collecticia – type locality for species
  - †Diffingia divisa – type locality for species
  - †Diffingia largifica
  - †Diffingia tortuosa – type locality for species
  - †Diffingia valida – type locality for species
- †Dimacrodon – type locality for genus
  - †Dimacrodon hottoni – type locality for species
- †Dimetrodon – type locality for genus
  - †Dimetrodon angelensis – type locality for species
  - †Dimetrodon booneorum – type locality for species
  - †Dimetrodon dollovianus – type locality for species
  - †Dimetrodon gigashomogenes – type locality for species
  - †Dimetrodon grandis – type locality for species
  - †Dimetrodon kempae – type locality for species
  - †Dimetrodon limbatus – type locality for species
  - †Dimetrodon loomisi – type locality for species
  - †Dimetrodon macrospondylus – type locality for species
  - †Dimetrodon milleri – type locality for species
  - †Dimetrodon natalis – type locality for species
- †Dioonitocarpidium
- †Diplanus
  - †Diplanus apochordus
  - †Diplanus catatonus – type locality for species
  - †Diplanus lamellatus – type locality for species
  - †Diplanus rarus
  - †Diplanus redactus
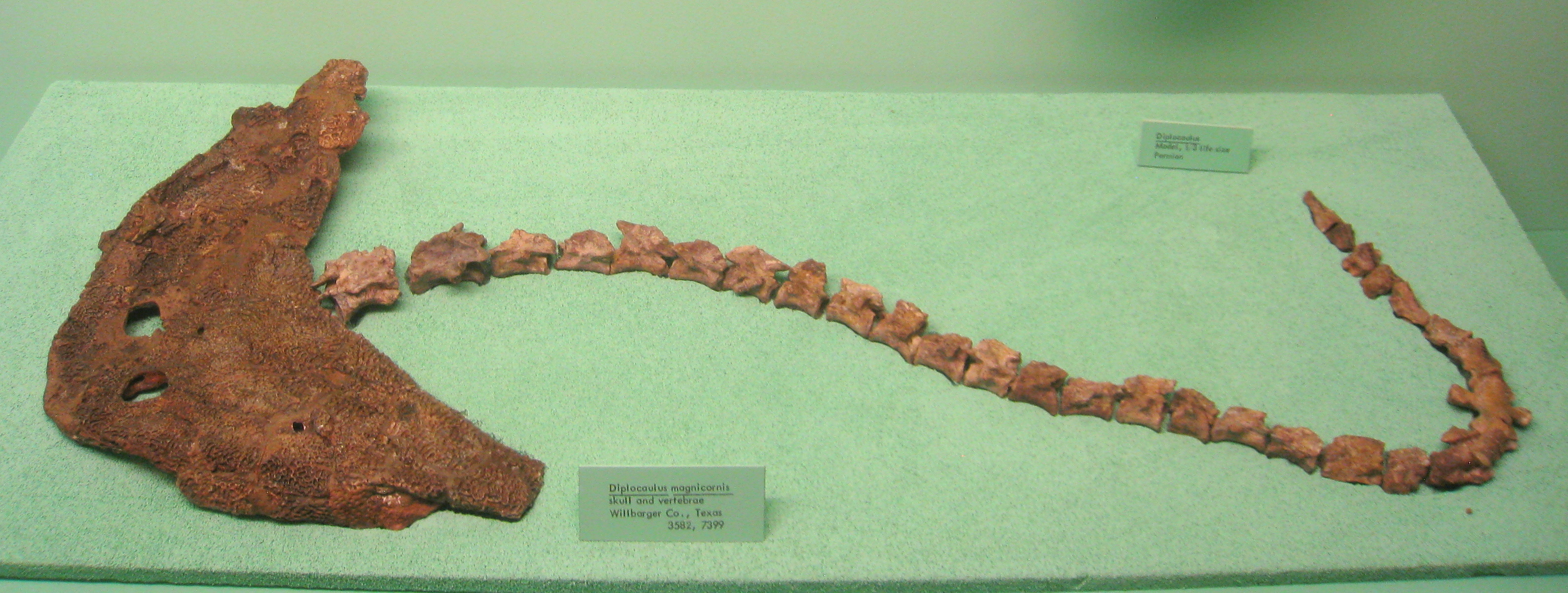
- Fossilized axial skeleton of the Carboniferous-Permian amphibian Diplocaulus
  †Diplocaulus – type locality for genus
  - †Diplocaulus brevirostris – type locality for species
  - †Diplocaulus copei – type locality for species
  - †Diplocaulus magnicornis – type locality for species
  - †Diplocaulus primus
  - †Diplocaulus recurvatus – type locality for species
- †Diploconula
  - †Diploconula biconvexa – type locality for species
- †Diplothmema
- †Diraphora
- †Discinites
- †Discotomaria
  - †Discotomaria basisulcata – type locality for species
  - †Discotomaria costata
  - †Discotomaria dubia – type locality for species
  - †Discotomaria nodosa – type locality for species
- †Discotropis – type locality for genus
  - †Discotropis girtyi – type locality for species
  - †Discotropis publicus
  - †Discotropis sulcifer
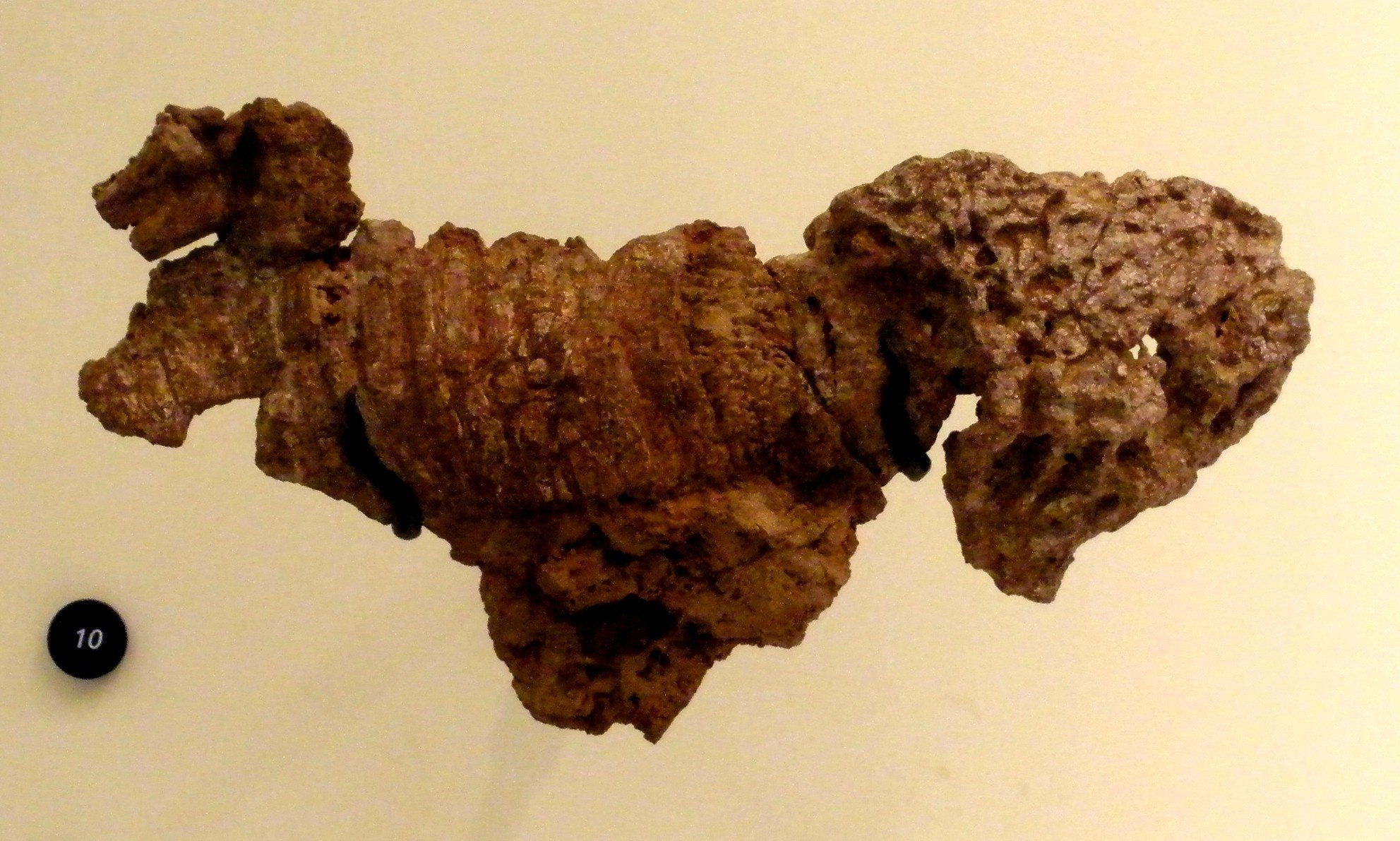
- Fossilized partial skeleton of the Carboniferous amphibian Dissorophus
  †Dissorophus – type locality for genus
  - †Dissorophus multicinctus – type locality for species
- †Ditomopyge
  - †Ditomopyge decurtata
  - †Ditomopyge scitula
- †Divaricosta
  - †Divaricosta squarrosa – type locality for species
  - †Divaricosta vagabunda
- †Djemelia – tentative report
- †Docoderma – type locality for genus
  - †Docoderma papillosum – type locality for species
  - †Docoderma rigida
- †Domatoceras
  - †Domatoceras texanum – type locality for species
- †Donaldina
  - †Donaldina gracilis – type locality for species
  - †Donaldina knighti – type locality for species
  - †Donaldina robusta
  - †Donaldina stevensana
  - †Donaldina type locality for species – informal
- †Donaldospira
  - †Donaldospira nodosa – type locality for species
- †Donezella
- †Driveria – type locality for genus
  - †Driveria ponderosa – type locality for species
- †Dunbarites
  - †Dunbarites boardmani – type locality for species
  - †Dunbarites rectilaterale
- †Durhamina
  - †Durhamina cordillerensis – type locality for species
- †Dvorakia
  - †Dvorakia philipi – tentative report
- †Dyoros
  - †Dyoros angulatus – type locality for species
  - †Dyoros attenuatus
  - †Dyoros auriculatus
  - †Dyoros complanatus
  - †Dyoros concavus – type locality for species
  - †Dyoros consanguineus – type locality for species
  - †Dyoros convexus
  - †Dyoros endospinus – type locality for species
  - †Dyoros extensiformis – type locality for species
  - †Dyoros extensus – type locality for species
  - †Dyoros giganteus
  - †Dyoros hillanus
  - †Dyoros intrepidus
  - †Dyoros lateralis
  - †Dyoros magnus
  - †Dyoros parvus – type locality for species
  - †Dyoros planiextensus – type locality for species
  - †Dyoros planus
  - †Dyoros quadrangulatus – type locality for species
  - †Dyoros rectangulatus – type locality for species
  - †Dyoros robustus
  - †Dyoros solidus – type locality for species
  - †Dyoros strigosus – type locality for species
  - †Dyoros subliratus
  - †Dyoros subquadratus
  - †Dyoros tenuis – type locality for species
  - †Dyoros tetragonus
  - †Dyoros transversus – type locality for species
  - †Dyoros vagabundus – type locality for species
  - †Dyoros vulgaris
  - †Dyoros wordensis – type locality for species
- †Dysoristus
  - †Dysoristus lochmanae

== E ==
- †Echinaria
  - †Echinaria moorei
  - †Echinaria semipunctatus – tentative report
- †Echinauris
  - †Echinauris bella – type locality for species
  - †Echinauris boulei
  - †Echinauris circularis
  - †Echinauris crassa
  - †Echinauris interrupta
  - †Echinauris irregularis – type locality for species
  - †Echinauris lappacea – type locality for species
  - †Echinauris lateralis
  - †Echinauris liumbona – type locality for species
  - †Echinauris parva – type locality for species
  - †Echinauris productelloides
  - †Echinauris subquadrata – type locality for species
  - †Echinauris venustula
- †Echinosteges
  - †Echinosteges guadalupensis – type locality for species
  - †Echinosteges tuberculatus – type locality for species
- †Economolopsis
  - †Economolopsis anodontoides
- †Ectenoceras
- †Ectenolites
  - †Ectenolites primus – type locality for species
- †Ectochoristites
  - †Ectochoristites inflatus – type locality for species
- †Ectoposia – type locality for genus
  - †Ectoposia grandis
  - †Ectoposia wildei – type locality for species
- †Ectosteorachis
  - †Ectosteorachis nitidus
- †Ectosterohachis
  - †Ectosterohachis nitidus
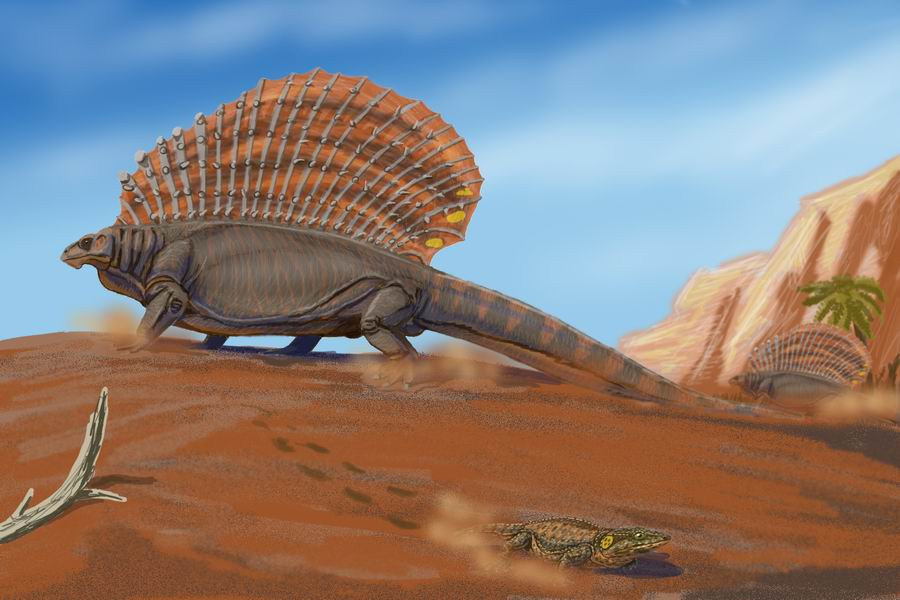
- Life restoration of the Carboniferous-Permian synapsid (mammal precursor) Edaphosaurus
  †Edaphosaurus – type locality for genus
  - †Edaphosaurus boanerges
  - †Edaphosaurus cruciger – or unidentified related form
  - †Edaphosaurus microdus
  - †Edaphosaurus pogonias – type locality for species
- †Edestus
  - †Edestus minor
- †Edmondia
  - †Edmondia bellula – type locality for species
  - †Edmondia glabra
  - †Edmondia rotunda – type locality for species
  - †Edmondia suborbiculata – tentative report
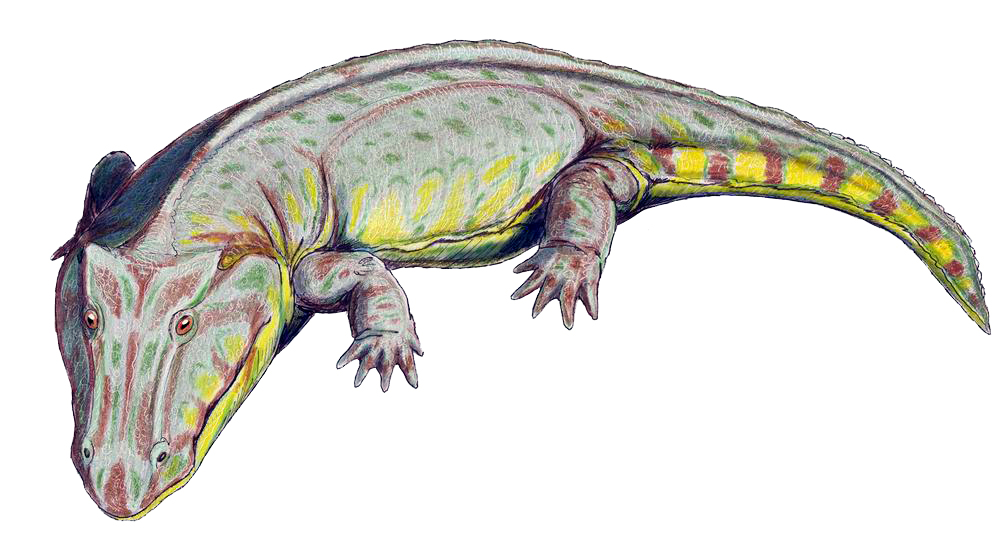
- Life restoration of the Permian amphibian Edops
  †Edops
  - †Edops craigi
- †Edriosteges – type locality for genus
  - †Edriosteges beedei – type locality for species
  - †Edriosteges compactus
  - †Edriosteges medlicottianus
  - †Edriosteges multispinosus – type locality for species
  - †Edriosteges tenuispinosus – type locality for species
- †Eirlysia
  - †Eirlysia exquisita – type locality for species
  - †Eirlysia nodosa – type locality for species
  - †Eirlysia reticulata
- †Elassonia
  - †Elassonia micraria
  - †Elassonia petila
  - †Elassonia scitula
- †Elibatocrinus
- †Eliva
  - †Eliva inflata
  - †Eliva shumardi
- †Elivina
  - †Elivina compacta – type locality for species
  - †Elivina detecta
  - †Elivina sulcifer
- †Ellesmeroceras
- †Elliottella
  - †Elliottella minima
  - †Elliottella multicostata
  - †Elliottella transversalis
  - †Elliottella varicostata – type locality for species
- †Elliptechinus – type locality for genus
  - †Elliptechinus kiwiaster – type locality for species
- †Elversella – type locality for genus
  - †Elversella rugosa
- †Elyx – tentative report
- †Emilites
  - †Emilites brownwoodi – type locality for species
  - †Emilites incertum
  - †Emilites incertus – type locality for species
- †Empedias
  - †Empedias molaris
- †Enallosia
  - †Enallosia rotundovata
- †Endelocrinus
  - †Endelocrinus grafordensis
  - †Endelocrinus tumidus
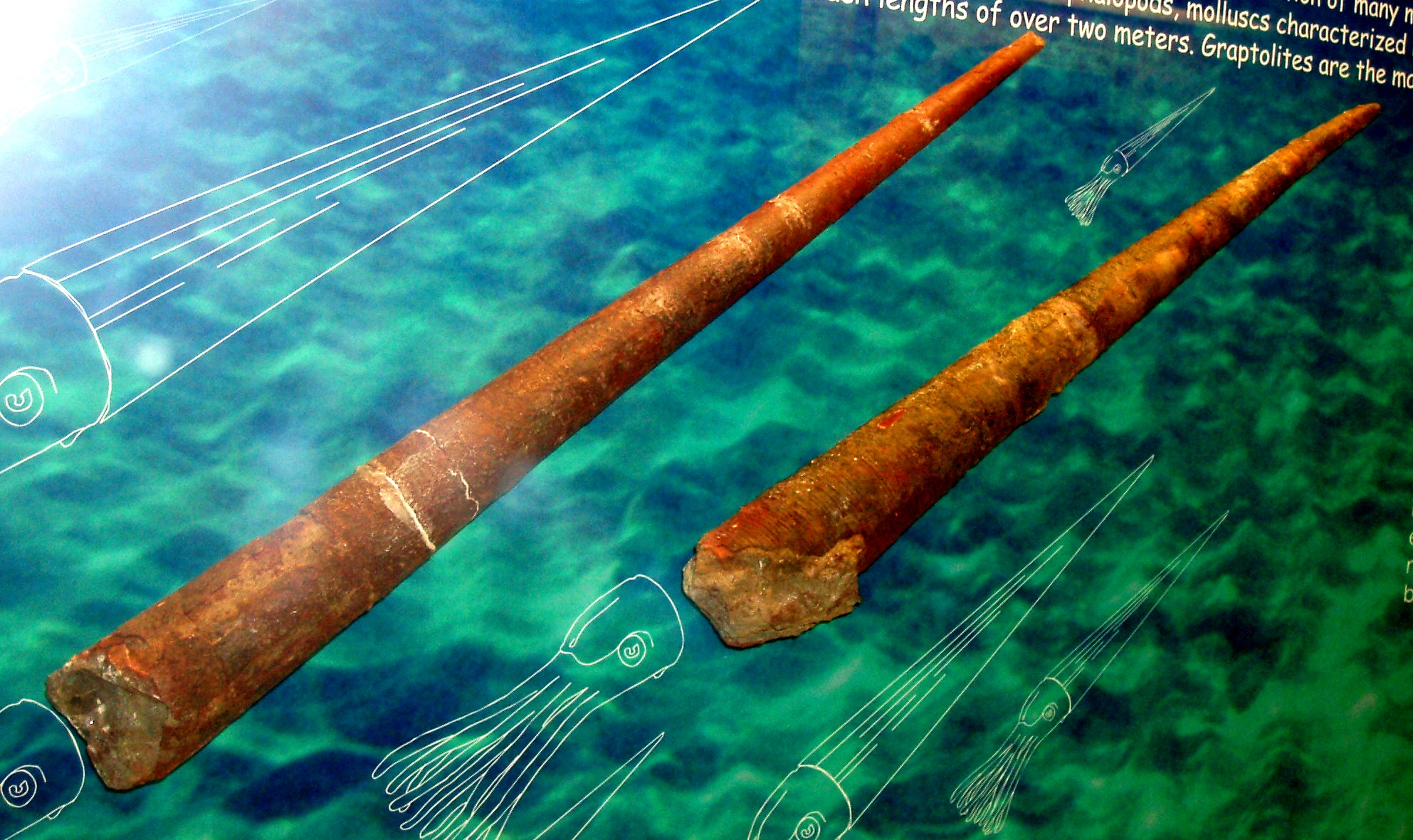
- Fossilized shells and restored appearances of the Middle-Late Ordovician nautiloid cephalopod Endoceras
  †Endoceras
  - †Endoceras baylorense
- †Endolobus
  - †Endolobus renfroae – type locality for species
- †Endoplegma
  - †Endoplegma calathus
- †Endothyra
- †Enteletes
  - †Enteletes angulatus – type locality for species
  - †Enteletes costellatus
  - †Enteletes densus
  - †Enteletes dumblei – type locality for species
  - †Enteletes exiguus
  - †Enteletes globosus – type locality for species
  - †Enteletes hemiplicata
  - †Enteletes leonardensis
  - †Enteletes liumbonus – type locality for species
  - †Enteletes plummeri – type locality for species
  - †Enteletes rotundobesus – type locality for species
  - †Enteletes stehlii – type locality for species
  - †Enteletes subcircularis
  - †Enteletes subnudus
  - †Enteletes wolfcampensis
  - †Enteletes wordensis
- †Eoasianites
  - †Eoasianites smithwickensis
  - †Eoasianites subhanieli
- †Eoastarte
  - †Eoastarte subcircularis
- †Eocamptonectes
  - †Eocamptonectes asperatus
  - †Eocamptonectes papillatus
  - †Eocamptonectes sculptilis
- Eocaudina
  - †Eocaudina marginata
  - †Eocaudina mccormacki
  - †Eocaudina septaforaminalis
  - †Eocaudina subhexagona
- †Eochonetes
  - †Eochonetes magna – type locality for species
  - †Eochonetes mucronata – type locality for species
- †Eolyttonia
  - †Eolyttonia catilla
  - †Eolyttonia chaotica – type locality for species
  - †Eolyttonia circularis – type locality for species
  - †Eolyttonia cornucopia
  - †Eolyttonia diabloensis
  - †Eolyttonia fredericksi – type locality for species
  - †Eolyttonia gigantea – type locality for species
  - †Eolyttonia parviconica
  - †Eolyttonia phialiforma
  - †Eolyttonia pocillata – type locality for species
  - †Eolyttonia progressa – type locality for species
- †Eomartiniopsis
  - †Eomartiniopsis girtyi
- †Eopteria
  - †Eopteria richardsoni
- †Eoschistoceras – type locality for genus
  - †Eoschistoceras strawnense – type locality for species
- †Eosyodon – type locality for genus
  - †Eosyodon hudsoni – type locality for species
- †Eothalassoceras – tentative report
- †Eothinites
  - †Eothinites hessensis – type locality for species
  - †Eothinites planulatus
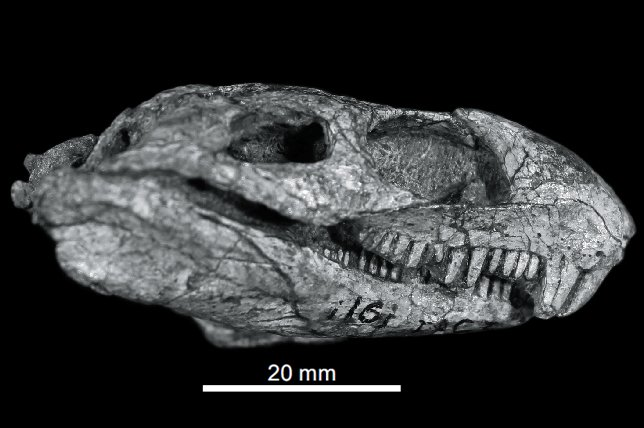
- Fossilized skull in multiple views of the Permian reptile Eothyris
  †Eothyris – type locality for genus
  - †Eothyris parkeyi – type locality for species
- †Eotiaris
  - †Eotiaris connorsi – type locality for species
  - †Eotiaris guadalupensis – type locality for species
- †Eowellerites
  - †Eowellerites moorei – type locality for species
- †Ephippioceras
  - †Ephippioceras inexpectans – type locality for species
  - †Ephippioceras moinellae
- †Epiactinotrypa
  - †Epiactinotrypa sera – type locality for species
- †Epimastopora
- †Epiphyton
- †Epithalassoceras
  - †Epithalassoceras type locality for species – informal
- †Eridmatus
  - †Eridmatus marathonensis – type locality for species
  - †Eridmatus texanus
- †Erisocrinus
  - †Erisocrinus propinquus – type locality for species
  - †Erisocrinus trinodus – type locality for species
- †Ernestiodendron
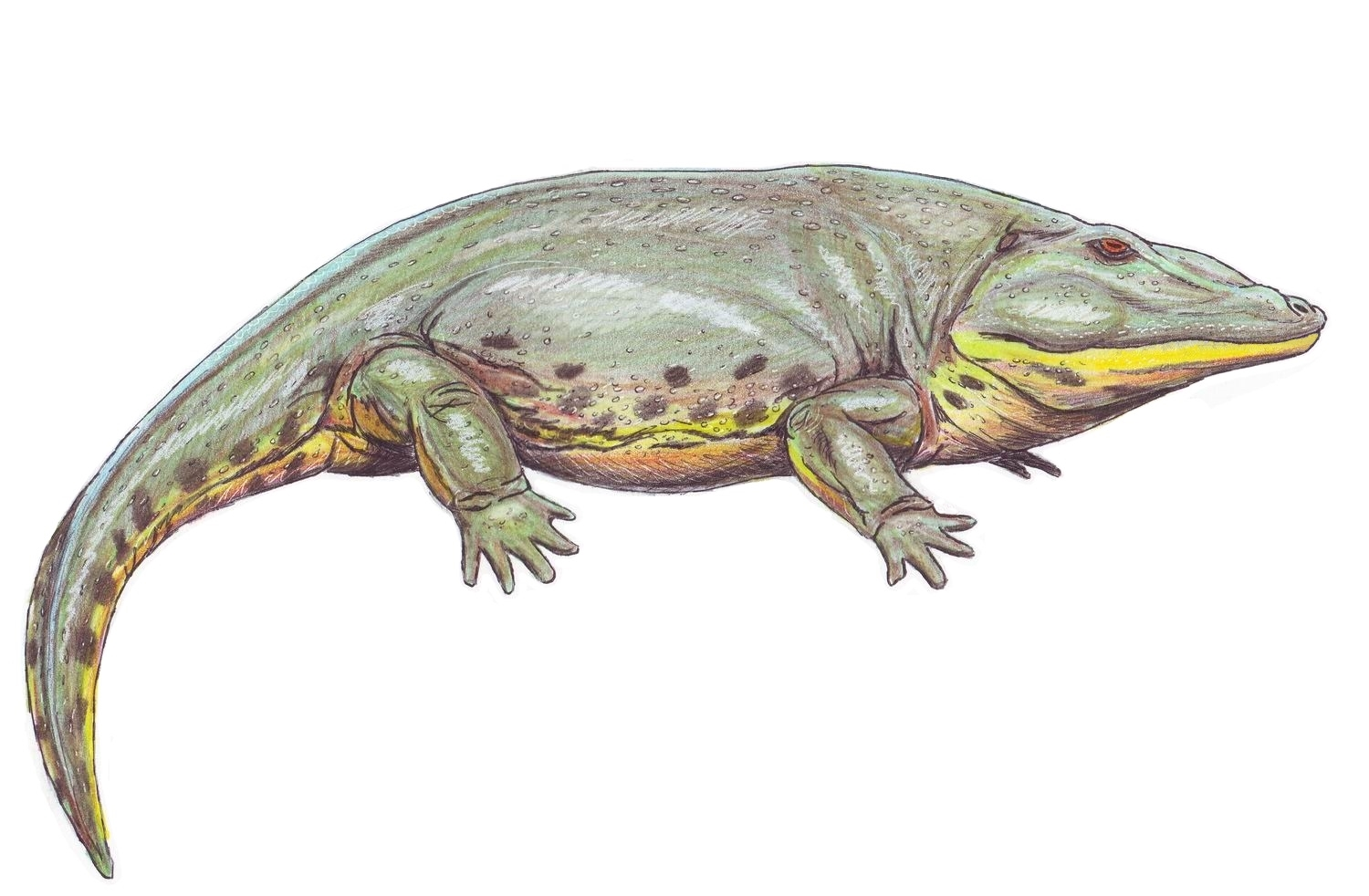
- Life restoration of the Carboniferous-Permian amphibian Eryops
  †Eryops – type locality for genus
  - †Eryops anatinus – type locality for species
  - †Eryops kayi – type locality for species
  - †Eryops megacephalus – type locality for species
- †Estheria
- †Etheridgella
  - †Etheridgella porosa – type locality for species
- †Etoblattina
  - †Etoblattina robusta – type locality for species
  - †Etoblattina texana – type locality for species
- †Euchondria
  - †Euchondria cooperi – type locality for species
- †Euconia – type locality for genus
  - †Euconia conicus
  - †Euconia etna
  - †Euconia umbilicata
- †Euconospira
  - †Euconospira obsoleta – type locality for species
  - †Euconospira pulchra – type locality for species
  - †Euconospira spiroperforata – type locality for species
  - †Euconospira varizona
- †Eugonophyllum
  - †Eugonophyllum huecoensis
  - †Eugonophyllum johnsonii
- †Eumedlicottia
  - †Eumedlicottia burckhardti – type locality for species
  - †Eumedlicottia whitneyi – type locality for species
- †Eumorphoceras
  - †Eumorphoceras bisulcatum
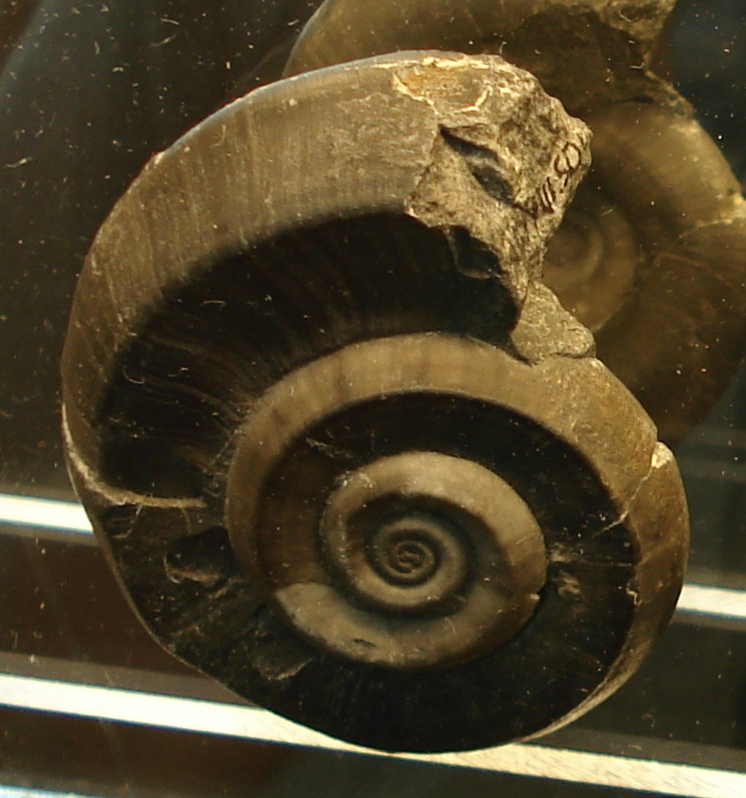
- Fossilized shell of the Silurian-Permian sea snail Euomphalus
  †Euomphalus
  - †Euomphalus cornudanus – type locality for species
  - †Euomphalus glabribasis
  - †Euomphalus kaibabensis
  - †Euomphalus levicarinatus – type locality for species
  - †Euomphalus pernodosus
- †Euonychocrinus
  - †Euonychocrinus subservire – type locality for species
- †Euphemites
  - †Euphemites aequisulcatus
  - †Euphemites batteni – type locality for species
  - †Euphemites blaneyanus
  - †Euphemites circumcostatus
  - †Euphemites crenulatus – type locality for species
  - †Euphemites exquisitus – type locality for species
  - †Euphemites imperator – type locality for species
  - †Euphemites kingi – type locality for species
  - †Euphemites luxuriosus – type locality for species
  - †Euphemites nodocarinatus
  - †Euphemites sparciliratus – type locality for species
  - †Euphemites vittatus
- †Euphemitopsis
  - †Euphemitopsis multinodosa – type locality for species
  - †Euphemitopsis paucinodosus
- †Eupleuroceras
  - †Eupleuroceras bellulum
- †Eurylepidoides – type locality for genus
  - †Eurylepidoides socialis – type locality for species
- †Euryodus – type locality for genus
  - †Euryodus primus – type locality for species
- †Euryphyllum – tentative report
  - †Euryphyllum profundum – type locality for species
  - †Euryphyllum robustum – type locality for species
- †Evolsonia
- †Exaulipora
  - †Exaulipora permica
- †Exovasa – type locality for genus
  - †Exovasa cystauletoides – type locality for species

== F ==
- †Falsiamplexus – type locality for genus
  - †Falsiamplexus delicata
  - †Falsiamplexus elongatus – type locality for species
  - †Falsiamplexus flexibilis – type locality for species
  - †Falsiamplexus reductus – type locality for species
- †Fascicosta
  - †Fascicosta bella
  - †Fascicosta elongata
  - †Fascicosta longaeva
- †Fayettevillea
- †Fenestella
  - †Fenestella amplia
  - †Fenestella archimediformis
  - †Fenestella capitanensis
  - †Fenestella firmior
  - †Fenestella girtyi
  - †Fenestella guadalupensis – type locality for species
  - †Fenestella hilli
  - †Fenestella popeana
  - †Fenestella schucherti – or unidentified comparable form
  - †Fenestella spinulifera
  - †Fenestella texana – type locality for species
- †Fenestrellina
- †Ferganispira
  - †Ferganispira acteonina – type locality for species
- †Fimbrinia
  - †Fimbrinia cristatotuberculata
  - †Fimbrinia ovata
  - †Fimbrinia plummeri
- †Finkelnburgia
  - †Finkelnburgia crassicostellata – or unidentified comparable form
  - †Finkelnburgia cullisonia – or unidentified comparable form
- †Fissispongia
  - †Fissispongia jacksboroensis
- †Fistulipora
  - †Fistulipora guadalupae – type locality for species
  - †Fistulipora guadalupensis
- †Flexuospiculata – type locality for genus
  - †Flexuospiculata hexactina – type locality for species
- †Foordiceras
  - †Foordiceras mammiferum – type locality for species
  - †Foordiceras ornatissimum – type locality for species
- †Fransonia
  - †Fransonia wyomingensis
- †Fusella
  - †Fusella llanoensis – type locality for species
- †Fusiella
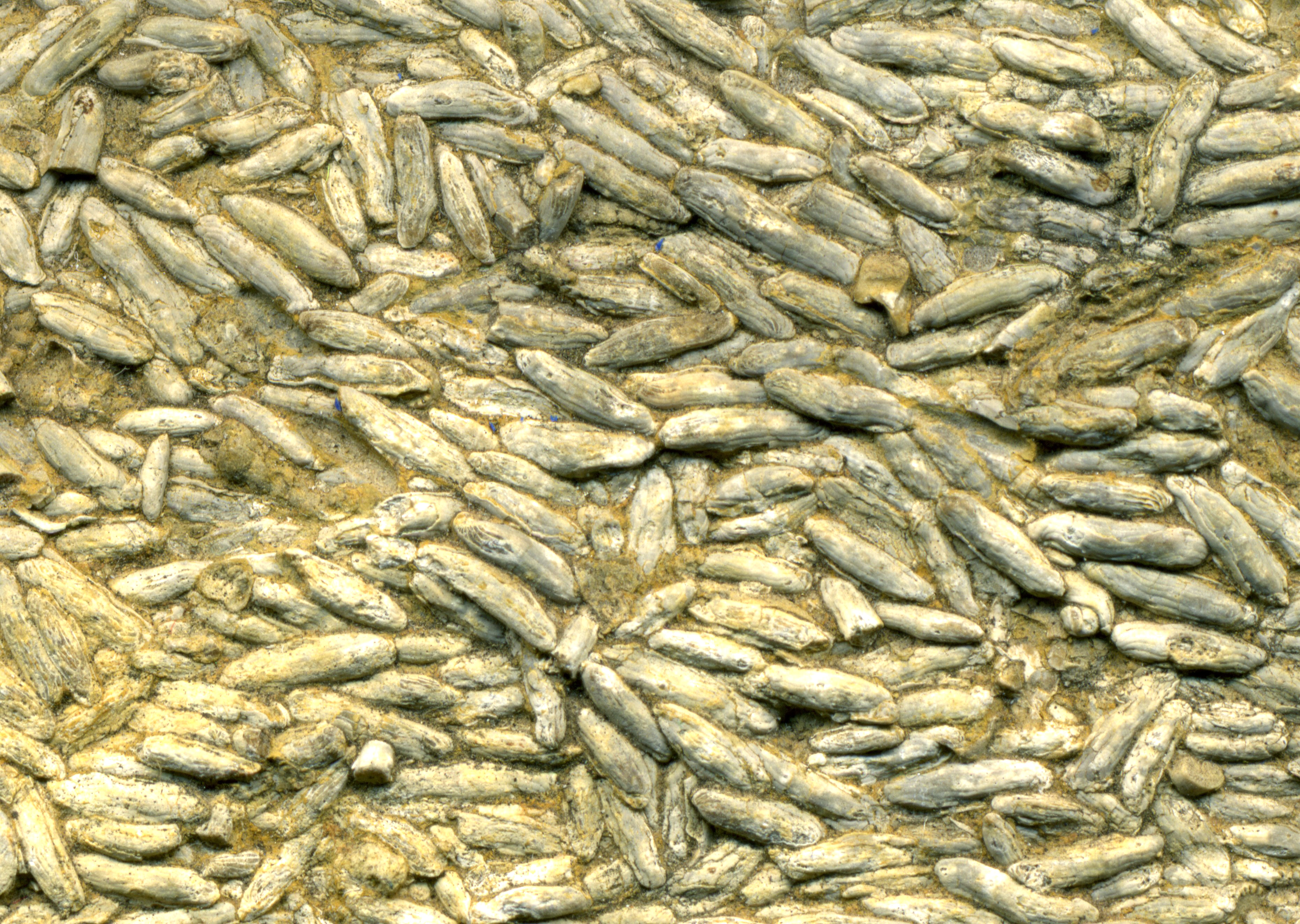
- Assemblage of fossils of Silurian-Permian fusulinid foraminiferans
  †Fusulina – report made of unidentified related form or using admittedly obsolete nomenclature
  - †Fusulina elongata – type locality for species

== G ==
- †Gasconadia
  - †Gasconadia putilla
- †Gastrioceras
  - †Gastrioceras montgomeryense
  - †Gastrioceras occidentale
- †Geinitzina
- †Genevievella
  - †Genevievella spinox
- †Geniculifera
  - †Geniculifera brevicula – type locality for species
- †Geragnostus
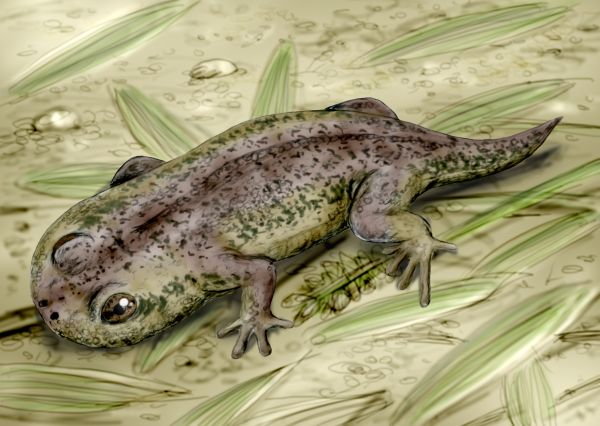
- Life restoration of the Permian frog precursor Gerobatrachus
  †Gerobatrachus – type locality for genus
  - †Gerobatrachus hottoni – type locality for species
- †Gervillia – report made of unidentified related form or using admittedly obsolete nomenclature
  - †Gervillia longa
- †Geyerella
  - †Geyerella americana – type locality for species
  - †Geyerella hessi – type locality for species
  - †Geyerella inexpectata – type locality for species
  - †Geyerella kingorum
- †Gigantonoclea
- †Gigantopteris
  - †Gigantopteris americana
- †Girtycoelia
  - †Girtycoelia typica
- †Girtyella
  - †Girtyella cedarensis – or unidentified related form
- †Girtyoceras
  - †Girtyoceras hamiltonense
  - †Girtyoceras meslerianum
- †Girtyocoelia
  - †Girtyocoelia beedei
- †Girtypecten
  - †Girtypecten sublaqueatus
- †Girtypora
  - †Girtypora constricta – type locality for species
  - †Girtypora hillana – type locality for species
  - †Girtypora ocellata
  - †Girtypora terminalis
  - †Girtypora vittata
- †Girtyporina
  - †Girtyporina incrustans – type locality for species
- †Girtyspira
  - †Girtyspira minuta
  - †Girtyspira yodai – type locality for species
- †Girvanella
- †Glabrocingulum
  - †Glabrocingulum alveozonum
  - †Glabrocingulum coronatum
  - †Glabrocingulum diablo
  - †Glabrocingulum grayvillense
  - †Glabrocingulum lupus
  - †Glabrocingulum texanum – type locality for species
- †Glaphyrites
  - †Glaphyrites angulatus
  - †Glaphyrites anguloumbilicatus
  - †Glaphyrites deciensis – type locality for species
  - †Glaphyrites hyattianus
  - †Glaphyrites kansasensis
  - †Glaphyrites millsi
  - †Glaphyrites modestus – type locality for species
  - †Glaphyrites raymondi
  - †Glaphyrites ruzencevi
  - †Glaphyrites welleri
- †Glassoceras
  - †Glassoceras normani – type locality for species
- †Glaucosaurus – type locality for genus
  - †Glaucosaurus megalops – type locality for species
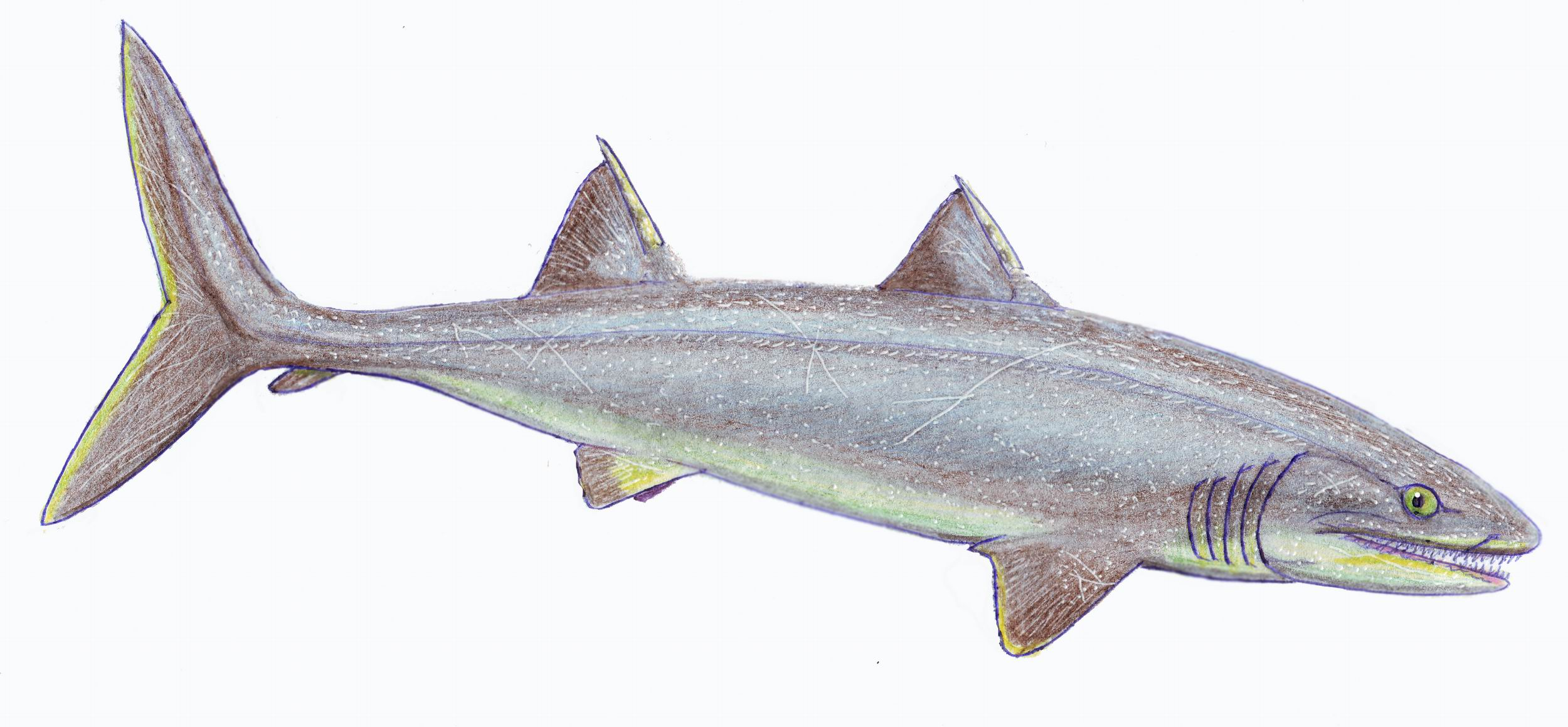
- Life restoration of the Carboniferous shark Glikmanius
  †Glikmanius
  - †Glikmanius occidentalis
- †Globivalvulina
- †Glossothyropsis
  - †Glossothyropsis carinata
  - †Glossothyropsis cryptacanthoides
  - †Glossothyropsis immatura
  - †Glossothyropsis juvenis
  - †Glossothyropsis polita
  - †Glossothyropsis rectangulata – type locality for species
  - †Glossothyropsis robusta
  - †Glossothyropsis sinuata
  - †Glossothyropsis superba – type locality for species
- †Gloverilima
  - †Gloverilima pratti
- †Glyptagnostus
- †Glyptorthis
  - †Glyptorthis maquoketensis
- †Glyptospira
  - †Glyptospira cingulata – type locality for species
  - †Glyptospira huecoensis – type locality for species
  - †Glyptospira quadriserrata – type locality for species
  - †Glyptospira tricostata
  - †Glyptospira turrita
- †Glyptosteges
  - †Glyptosteges angustus – type locality for species
  - †Glyptosteges insculptus
  - †Glyptosteges intricatus – type locality for species
  - †Glyptosteges sulcatus
- †Glyptotomaria – type locality for genus
  - †Glyptotomaria apiarium – type locality for species
  - †Glyptotomaria marginata – type locality for species
  - †Glyptotomaria pistra – type locality for species
- †Gnamptorhynchos
  - †Gnamptorhynchos prayi
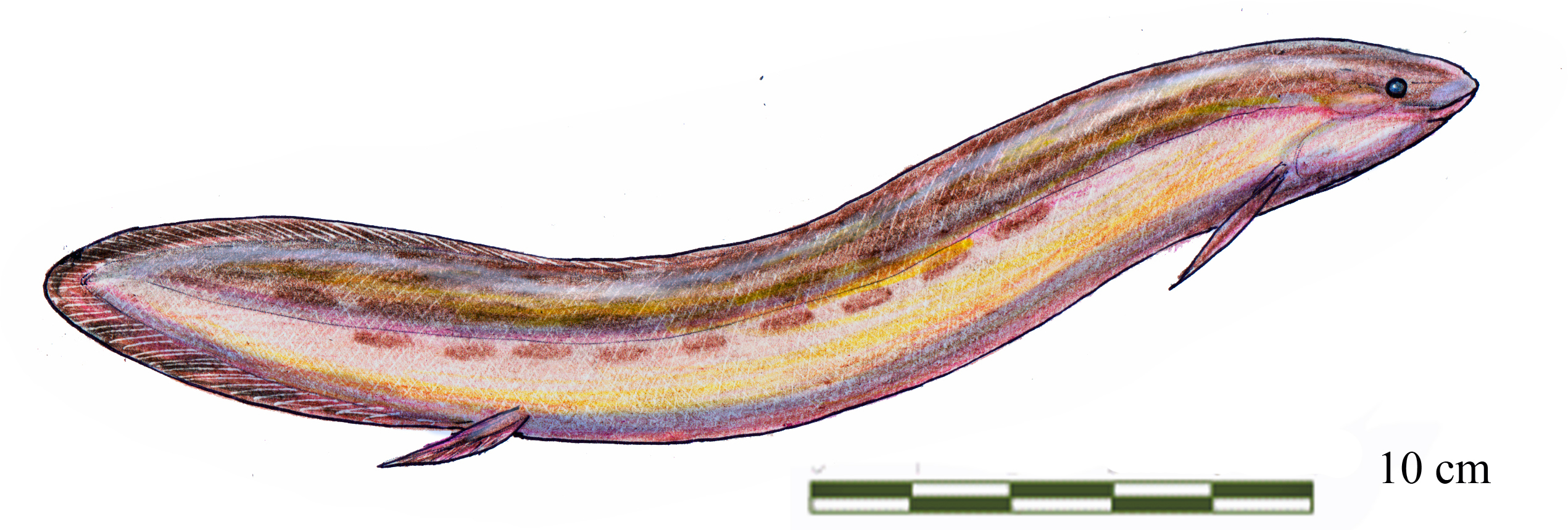
- Life restoration of the Permian lungfish Gnathorhiza
  †Gnathorhiza
  - †Gnathorhiza dikeloda – type locality for species
  - †Gnathorhiza serrata
- †Gomphostrobus
  - †Gomphostrobus bifidus
- †Goniarina
  - †Goniarina appeli – type locality for species
  - †Goniarina diabloensis
  - †Goniarina futilis
  - †Goniarina magniextensa
  - †Goniarina permiana
  - †Goniarina pyelodes
  - †Goniarina striata
- †Goniasma
  - †Goniasma lasallense
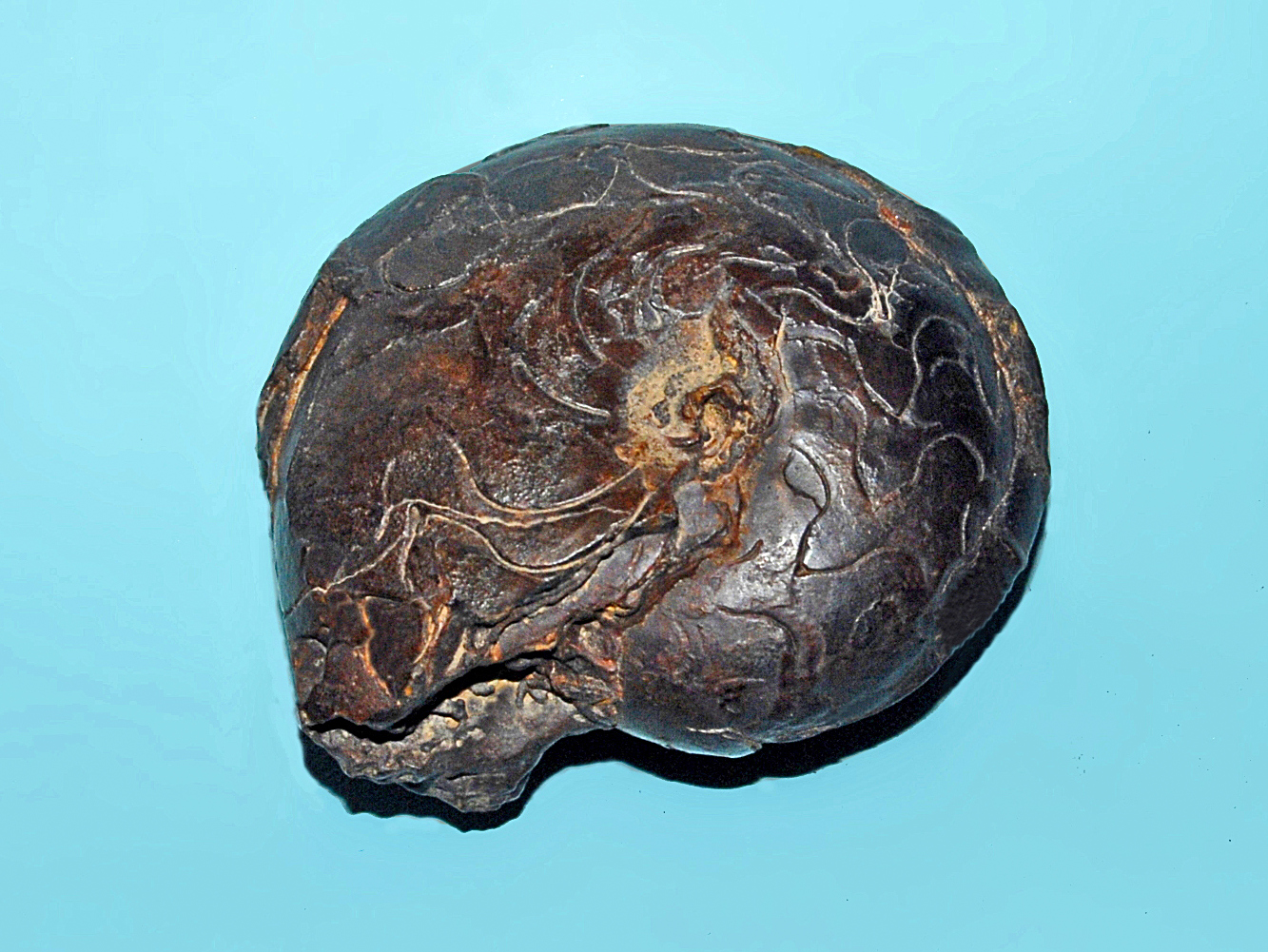
- Fossilized shell of the Late Devonian-Late Triassic ammonoid cephalopod Goniatites
  †Goniatites
  - †Goniatites eganensis
  - †Goniatites multiliratus
- †Goniocephalus – type locality for genus
  - †Goniocephalus willistoni – type locality for species
- †Goniocladia
  - †Goniocladia americana
- †Gonioloboceras
  - †Gonioloboceras bridgeportense – type locality for species
  - †Gonioloboceras goniolobus
  - †Gonioloboceras gracellenae
  - †Gonioloboceras parrishi
  - †Gonioloboceras welleri
- †Gorgodon – type locality for genus
  - †Gorgodon minutus – type locality for species
- †Gosseletina
  - †Gosseletina permiana – type locality for species
- †Grammatodon
  - †Grammatodon politus
- †Grandaurispina
  - †Grandaurispina bella – type locality for species
  - †Grandaurispina belliformis
  - †Grandaurispina crassa
  - †Grandaurispina elongata
  - †Grandaurispina gibbosa – type locality for species
  - †Grandaurispina kingorum – type locality for species
  - †Grandaurispina meekana
  - †Grandaurispina rara
  - †Grandaurispina rudis
  - †Grandaurispina signata – type locality for species
  - †Grandaurispina undulata
  - †Grandaurispina vaga – type locality for species
- †Graphiocrinus
  - †Graphiocrinus bridgeportensis – type locality for species
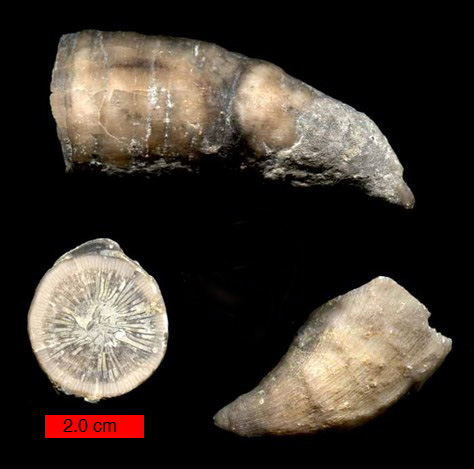
- Multiple views of a fossil of the Ordovician horn coral Grewingkia
  †Grewingkia
  - †Grewingkia crassa
  - †Grewingkia franklinensis
  - †Grewingkia robusta
- †Griffithidella
  - †Griffithidella alternata
  - †Griffithidella doris
- †Gryphochiton
  - †Gryphochiton girtyi – type locality for species
- †Guadalupelosia
  - †Guadalupelosia inexpectans
- †Guadalupia
  - †Guadalupia auricula – type locality for species
  - †Guadalupia cupulosa – type locality for species
  - †Guadalupia favosa – type locality for species
  - †Guadalupia lepta – type locality for species
  - †Guadalupia microcamera – type locality for species
  - †Guadalupia minuta – type locality for species
  - †Guadalupia ramescens – type locality for species
  - †Guadalupia vasa – type locality for species
  - †Guadalupia zitteliana
- †Guizhoupecten
  - †Guizhoupecten cheni
- †Gypospirifer – type locality for genus
  - †Gypospirifer anancites – type locality for species
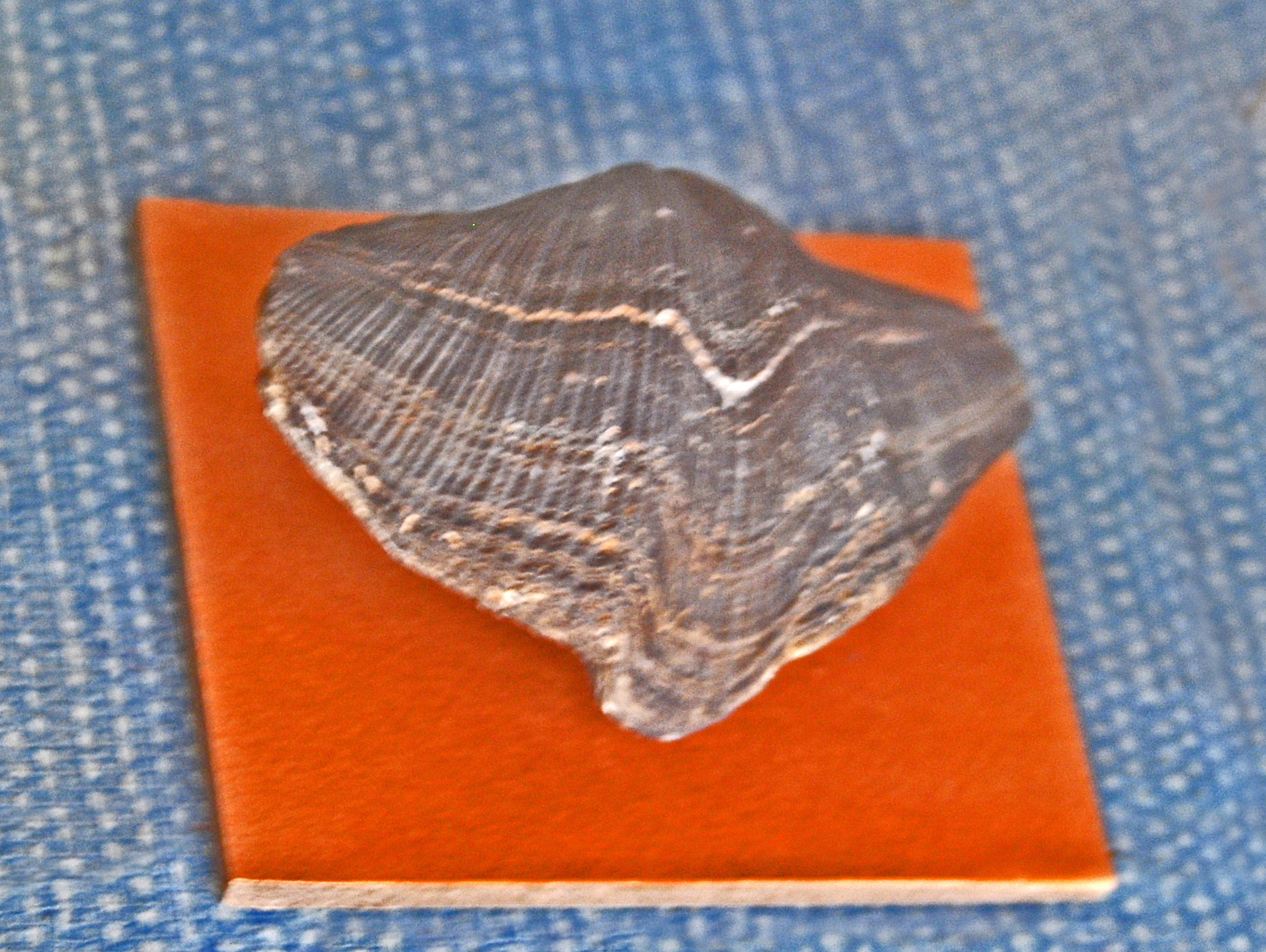
  - Fossilized shell of the Carboniferous-Permian brachiopod Gypospirifer condor
    †Gypospirifer condor
  - †Gypospirifer infraplicus
  - †Gypospirifer nelsoni

== H ==
- †Hadropipetta
  - †Hadropipetta ancora
- †Hamburgia
  - †Hamburgia chappelensis – type locality for species
  - †Hamburgia texana
- †Haplistion
  - †Haplistion aeluroglossa – type locality for species
  - †Haplistion megalochetus – type locality for species
  - †Haplistion skinneri – or unidentified comparable form
- †Hayasakapecten
  - †Hayasakapecten americanus
- †Healdia
  - †Healdia unispinosa – type locality for species
  - †Healdia vidriensis – type locality for species
- †Hebertella
  - †Hebertella occidentalis
- †Hebetorthoceras
  - †Hebetorthoceras brokenarrowense
- †Helicoconchus – type locality for genus
  - †Helicoconchus elongatus – type locality for species
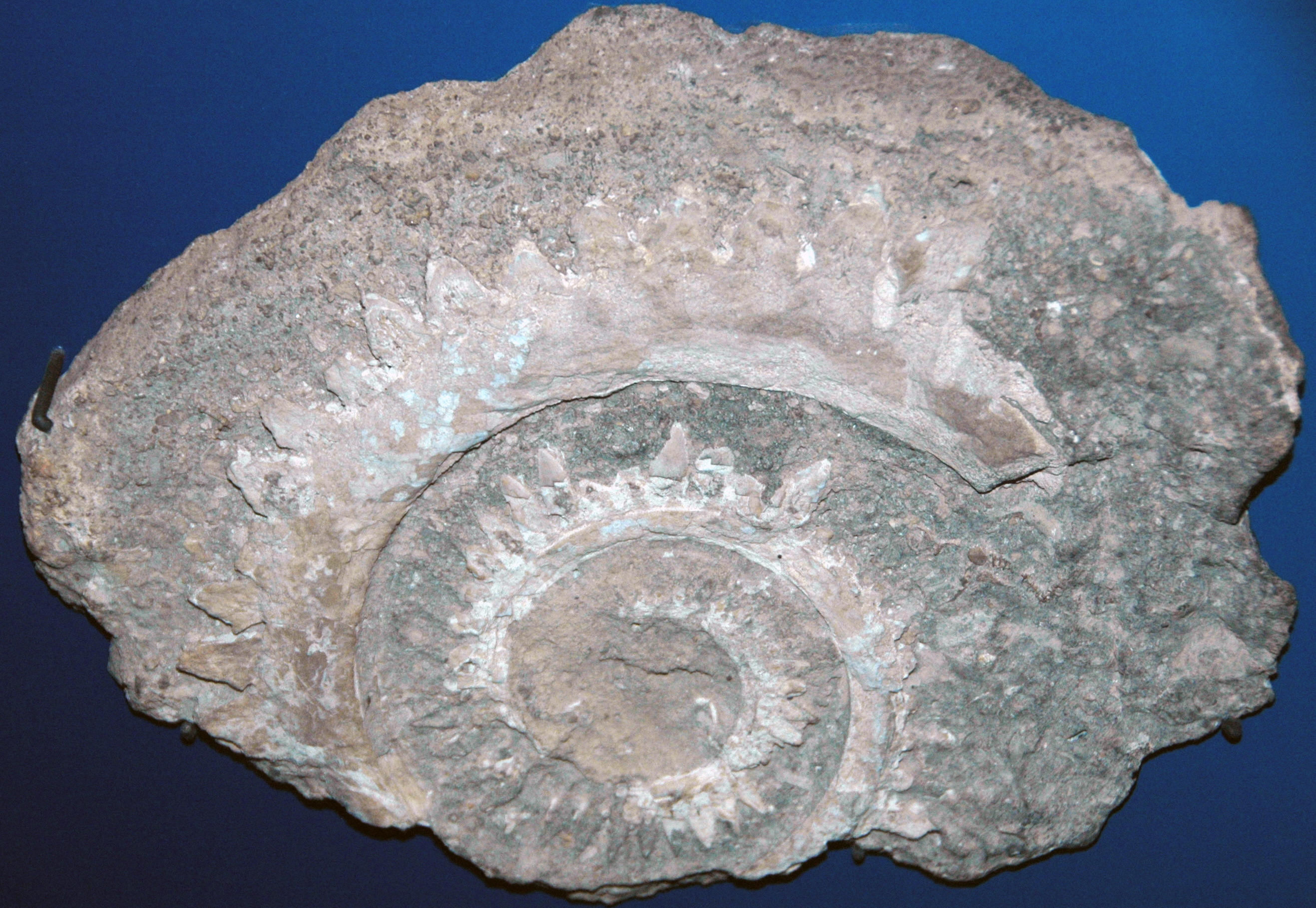
- Fossilized tooth whorl of the Carboniferous Chimaera relative Helicoprion
  †Helicoprion
  - †Helicoprion davisii
- †Heliospongia
  - †Heliospongia excavata
  - †Heliospongia ramosa
  - †Heliospongia vokesi
- †Helminthochiton
  - †Helminthochiton simplex
- †Hemileurus
  - †Hemileurus runcinatus
- †Hemiliroceras
  - †Hemiliroceras reticulatum
- †Hemizyga
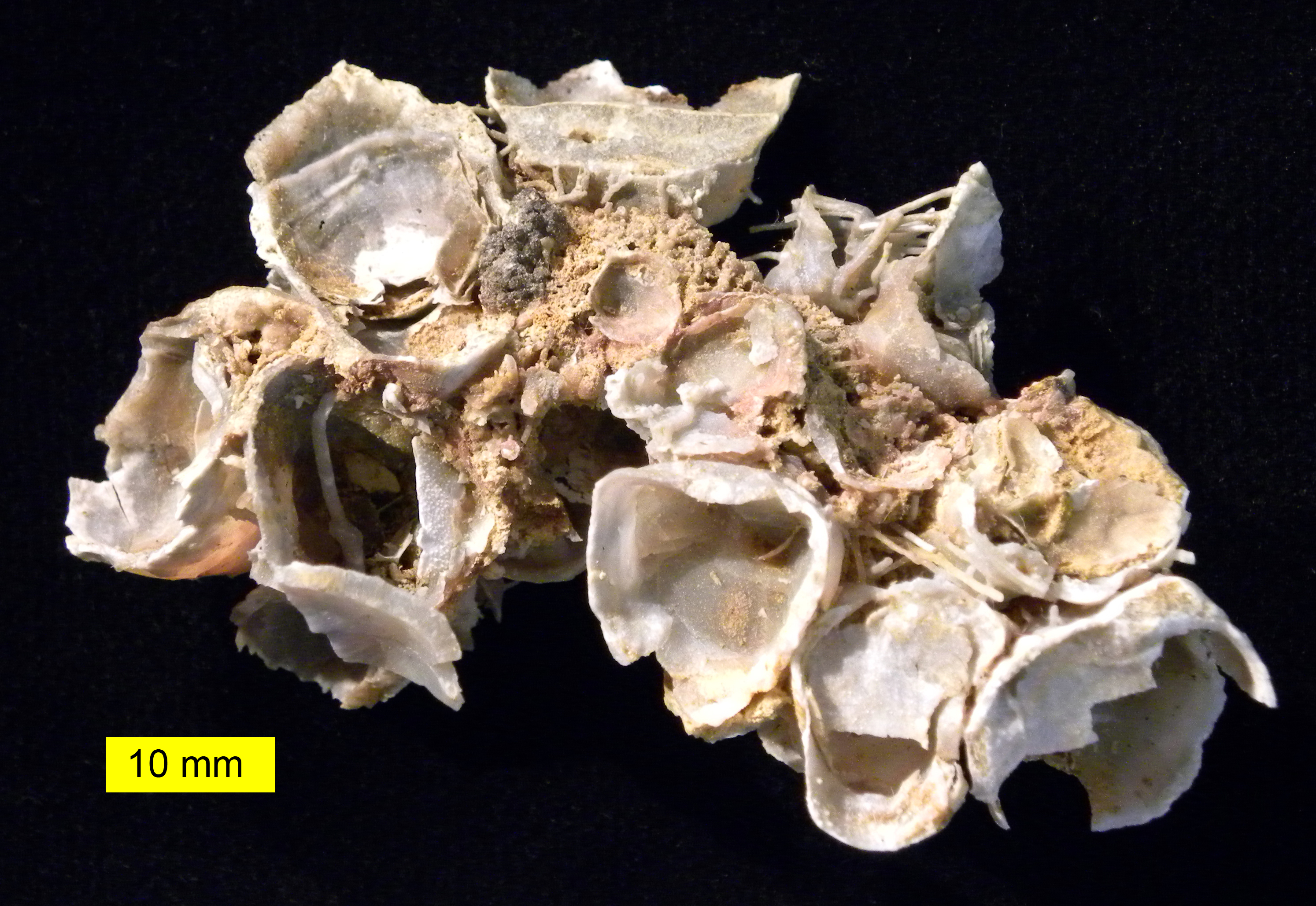
- Hercosestria
  †Hercosestria
  - †Hercosestria cribrosa – type locality for species
  - †Hercosestria hystricula
  - †Hercosestria laevis
- †Hercosia
  - †Hercosia delicata
  - †Hercosia uddeni – type locality for species
- †Heritschioides
- †Hermosanema
  - †Hermosanema carinatum – type locality for species
- †Hesperiella
  - †Hesperiella permianus – type locality for species
  - †Hesperiella wordensis
- †Heteralosia
  - †Heteralosia hystricula – type locality for species
  - †Heteralosia magnispina
  - †Heteralosia paucispinosa
  - †Heteralosia tenuispina
  - †Heteralosia vidriensis
- †Heteraria
  - †Heteraria blakemorei
- †Heterelasma
  - †Heterelasma angulatum
  - †Heterelasma concavum – type locality for species
  - †Heterelasma contortum
  - †Heterelasma geniculatum
  - †Heterelasma gibbosum – type locality for species
  - †Heterelasma glansfagea – type locality for species
  - †Heterelasma lenticularia
  - †Heterelasma magnum
  - †Heterelasma pentagonum – type locality for species
  - †Heterelasma quadratum
  - †Heterelasma shumardianum
  - †Heterelasma solidum – type locality for species
  - †Heterelasma sulciplicatum
  - †Heterelasma venustulum
- †Heteropecten
  - †Heteropecten vanvleeti
- †Heteroschizodus – type locality for genus
  - †Heteroschizodus macomoides – type locality for species
- †Hexirregularia – type locality for genus
  - †Hexirregularia nana – type locality for species
- †Hiscobeccus – tentative report
  - †Hiscobeccus capax
- †Hoffmannia – report made of unidentified related form or using admittedly obsolete nomenclature
  - †Hoffmannia fisheri – type locality for species
- †Holcacephalus
  - †Holcacephalus tenerus
- †Holosia – type locality for genus
  - †Holosia ovalis – type locality for species
  - †Holosia ovoidea
  - †Holosia regularis
- †Holotricharina – type locality for genus
  - †Holotricharina hirsuta – type locality for species
  - †Holotricharina sparsa – type locality for species
- †Homagnostus
- †Hormotoma
  - †Hormotoma moderata – type locality for species
- †Hustedia
  - †Hustedia ampullacea – type locality for species
  - †Hustedia bipartita
  - †Hustedia catella – type locality for species
  - †Hustedia cepacea
  - †Hustedia citeria
  - †Hustedia compressa
  - †Hustedia connorsi – type locality for species
  - †Hustedia consuta – type locality for species
  - †Hustedia crepax
  - †Hustedia culcitula
  - †Hustedia cuneata – type locality for species
  - †Hustedia decollatensis
  - †Hustedia demissa
  - †Hustedia glomerosa
  - †Hustedia hapala
  - †Hustedia hessensis – type locality for species
  - †Hustedia huecoensis – type locality for species
  - †Hustedia inconspicua
  - †Hustedia lusca – type locality for species
  - †Hustedia meekana
  - †Hustedia mormoni
  - †Hustedia mormonii
  - †Hustedia narinosa
  - †Hustedia opsia
  - †Hustedia papillata – type locality for species
  - †Hustedia pugilla – type locality for species
  - †Hustedia pusilla
  - †Hustedia rupinata
  - †Hustedia samiata
  - †Hustedia sculptilis – type locality for species
  - †Hustedia spicata – type locality for species
  - †Hustedia stataria
  - †Hustedia texana
  - †Hustedia tomea
  - †Hustedia trisecta
  - †Hustedia trita
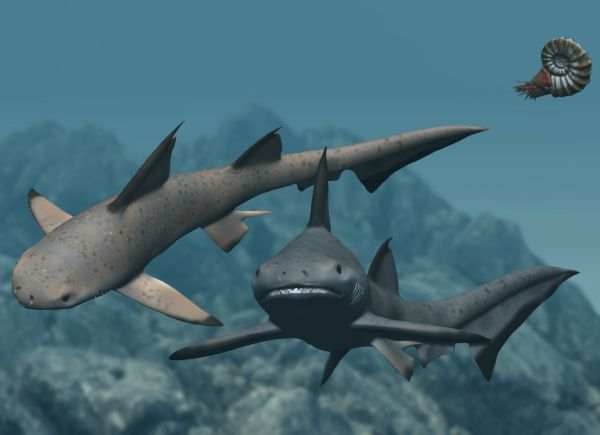
- Restoration of two of the Permian-Late Cretaceous cartilaginous fish Hybodus
  †Hybodus
  - †Hybodus copei – type locality for species
- †Hypergonia
  - †Hypergonia percostata
- †Hypopsia
  - †Hypopsia versuta
- †Hypselentoma
  - †Hypselentoma ornata – type locality for species
- †Hypseloconus
- †Hypsiptycha
  - †Hypsiptycha argenturbicum
  - †Hypsiptycha neenah
- †Hystriculina
  - †Hystriculina convexa
  - †Hystriculina dugoutensis – type locality for species
  - †Hystriculina minima
  - †Hystriculina pumila
  - †Hystriculina sulcata – type locality for species
  - †Hystriculina ventroplana
  - †Hystriculina wabashensis
- †Hystricurus

== I ==
- †Ianthinopsis
  - †Ianthinopsis medialis
- †Icriodus
  - †Icriodus eolatericrescens
  - †Icriodus gravesi
- †Ideliopsis – type locality for genus
  - †Ideliopsis ovalis – type locality for species
- †Illusioluidia – type locality for genus
  - †Illusioluidia teneryi – type locality for species
- †Incisimura – type locality for genus
  - †Incisimura bella – type locality for species
- †Incrustospongia – type locality for genus
  - †Incrustospongia meandrica – type locality for species
- †Institella
  - †Institella leonardensis – type locality for species
- †Insulipora
  - †Insulipora elegans
- †Iotina
  - †Iotina minuta
- †Isacrodus – type locality for genus
  - †Isacrodus marthae – type locality for species
- †Ischnoptygma
  - †Ischnoptygma archibaldi – type locality for species
  - †Ischnoptygma valentinei – type locality for species
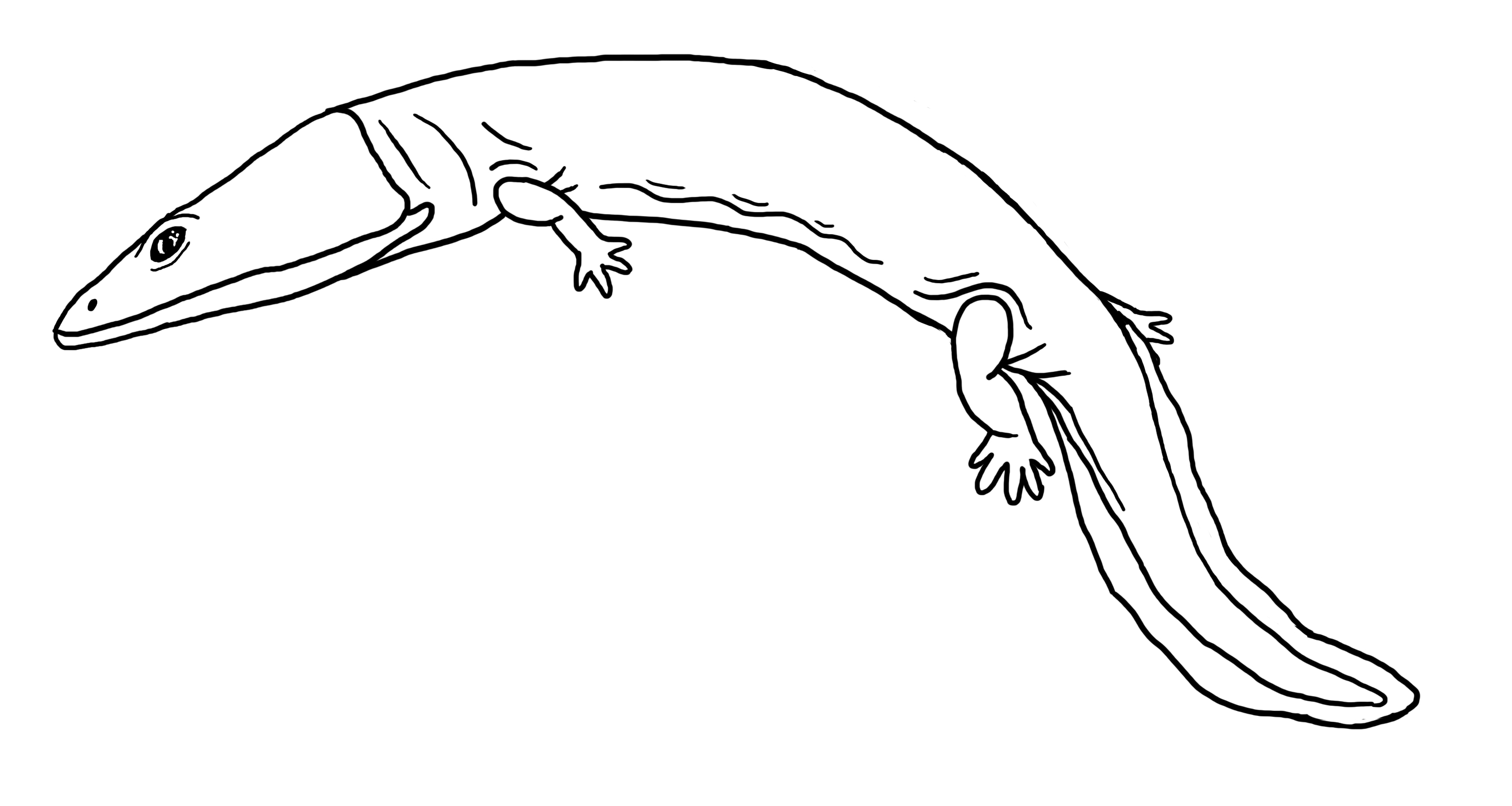
- Life restoration of the Permian amphibian Isodectes
  †Isodectes
  - †Isodectes obtusus – type locality for species
- †Isogramma
  - †Isogramma concavum
  - †Isogramma diabloense
  - †Isogramma lobatum
  - †Isogramma millepunctata
  - †Isogramma vidriense
- †Isotrypa
- †Ivanovia

== J ==
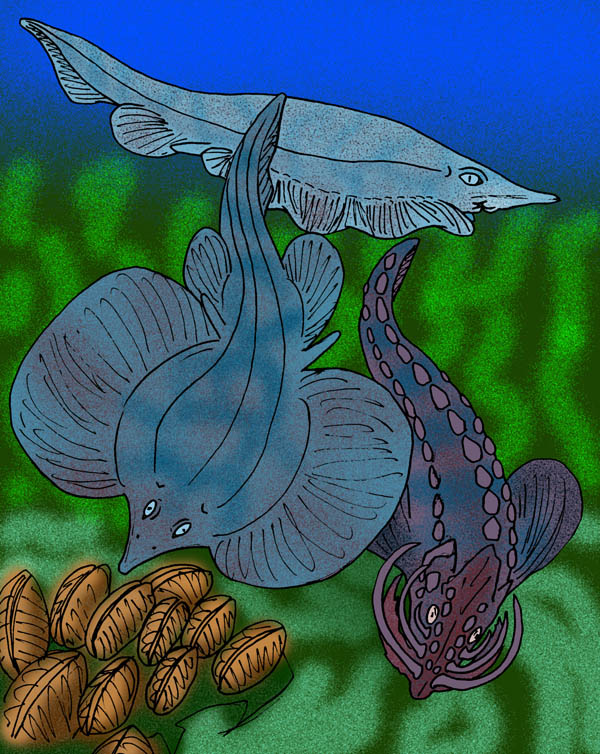
- Restoration of the Carboniferous-Permian ray-like cartilaginous fish Janassa (top and left)
  †Janassa
- †Jeffersonia
  - †Jeffersonia granosa
- †Jereina – type locality for genus
  - †Jereina cylindrica – type locality for species
  - †Jereina ramosa – type locality for species
- †Jinogondolella
  - †Jinogondolella aserrata
  - †Jinogondolella gladirobusta
  - †Jinogondolella nankingensis
  - †Jinogondolella postserrata
- †Juresania
- †Juresanites
  - †Juresanites colemanensis – type locality for species

== K ==
- †Kahneria – type locality for genus
  - †Kahneria seltina – type locality for species
- †Kaibabella
  - †Kaibabella basilica
- †Kalodomia
  - †Kalodomia rugosa
- †Kargalites
  - †Kargalites subquadratum
  - †Kargalites subquadratus – type locality for species
  - †Kargalites type locality for species – informal
- †Kaskia
  - †Kaskia rarus
- †Kellettina
  - †Kellettina vidriensis – type locality for species
- †Kindlella – type locality for genus
  - †Kindlella centrinoda – type locality for species
  - †Kindlella fissiloba – type locality for species
- †Kingopora – tentative report
- †Kingstonia
  - †Kingstonia pontotocensis
- †Kinsabia
  - †Kinsabia variegata
- †Kirkbya
- †Knightina – tentative report
  - †Knightina cuestaforma – type locality for species
  - †Knightina macknighti – type locality for species
- †Knightites
  - †Knightites maximus – type locality for species
  - †Knightites medius – type locality for species
- †Knightoceras
  - †Knightoceras kempae – type locality for species
- †Knoxosaurus – type locality for genus
  - †Knoxosaurus niteckii – type locality for species
- †Kochiproductus
  - †Kochiproductus elongatus
  - †Kochiproductus occidentalis – type locality for species
  - †Kochiproductus peruvianus
  - †Kochiproductus primitivus – type locality for species
  - †Kochiproductus quadratus
  - †Kochiproductus victorioensis – type locality for species
- †Kockelella
  - †Kockelella ortus
- †Komia
- †Komiella – report made of unidentified related form or using admittedly obsolete nomenclature
  - †Komiella ostiolata
- †Kormagnostus
  - †Kormagnostus seclusus
- †Kozlowskia
  - †Kozlowskia alata
  - †Kozlowskia anterosulcata
  - †Kozlowskia capaci
  - †Kozlowskia kingi
  - †Kozlowskia nasuta
  - †Kozlowskia splendens
  - †Kozlowskia subsphaeroidalis
- †Kutorginella
  - †Kutorginella dartoni – type locality for species
  - †Kutorginella lasallensis
  - †Kutorginella robusta
  - †Kutorginella sullivanensis
  - †Kutorginella uddeni
  - †Kutorginella umbonata

== L ==
- †Labidosaurikos
  - †Labidosaurikos meachami – type locality for species
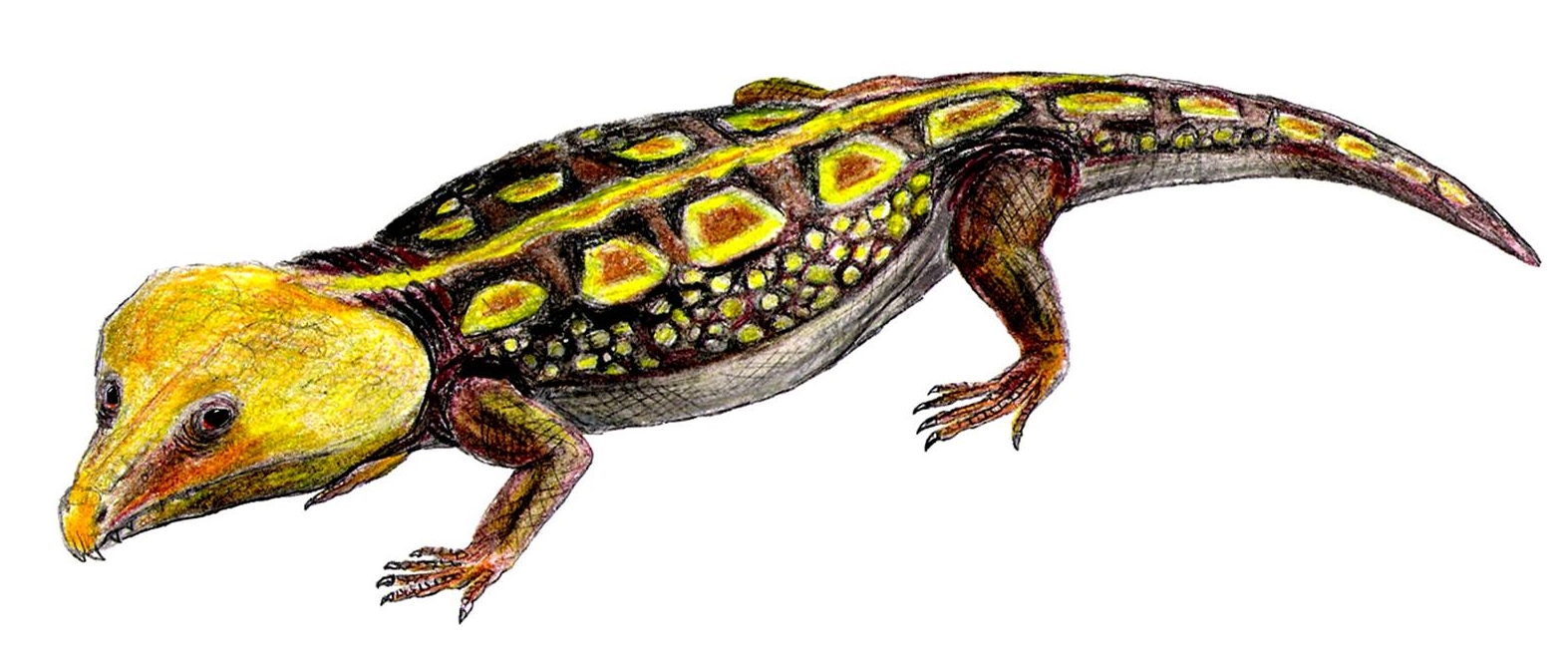
- Life restoration of the Permian reptile Labidosaurus
  †Labidosaurus
  - †Labidosaurus barkeri
  - †Labidosaurus hamatus – type locality for species
- †Labridens
  - †Labridens shupei
- †Lacunospira
  - †Lacunospira alta – type locality for species
  - †Lacunospira altsia
  - †Lacunospira lirata – type locality for species
- †Lamarodus – type locality for genus
  - †Lamarodus triangulus – type locality for species
- †Lambeoceras
  - †Lambeoceras rotundum
- †Lamellosia
  - †Lamellosia lamellosa
- †Lamellospira
  - †Lamellospira cincta – type locality for species
  - †Lamellospira conica
  - †Lamellospira spinosa – type locality for species
- †Langepis – type locality for genus
  - †Langepis campbelli
- †Laudonocrinus
  - †Laudonocrinus subsinuatus
- †Lawnia – type locality for genus
  - †Lawnia taylorensis – type locality for species
- †Lebachia
- †Lecanospira – type locality for genus
  - †Lecanospira lecanospiroides – type locality for species
  - †Lecanospira sanctisabae
- †Lecythiocrinus
- †Leella
  - †Leella bellula – or unidentified comparable form
- †Leioclema
  - †Leioclema dozierense – type locality for species
  - †Leioclema shumardi
- †Leiorhynchoidea
  - †Leiorhynchoidea amygdaloidea – type locality for species
  - †Leiorhynchoidea rotundidorsa
  - †Leiorhynchoidea scelesta
  - †Leiorhynchoidea sublamellosa
  - †Leiorhynchoidea sulcata
- †Leiorhynchus
  - †Leiorhynchus bisulcatum
  - †Leiorhynchus nobilis
- †Leiostegium
- †Lekiskochiton – type locality for genus
  - †Lekiskochiton fornicis – type locality for species
- †Lemonea
  - †Lemonea cylindrica
  - †Lemonea digitata – type locality for species
  - †Lemonea simplex – type locality for species
- †Leonardophyllum
  - †Leonardophyllum kingi – type locality for species
- †Lepetopsis
  - †Lepetopsis capitanensis – type locality for species
  - †Lepetopsis haworthi – type locality for species
- †Lepidocrania – type locality for genus
  - †Lepidocrania sparsispinosa – type locality for species
  - †Lepidocrania sublamellosa
  - †Lepidocrania tardispinosa – type locality for species
- †Lepidocyclus
  - †Lepidocyclus laddi
  - †Lepidocyclus manniensis
- †Lepidophyllum
- †Lepidospirifer
  - †Lepidospirifer angulatus – type locality for species
  - †Lepidospirifer costellus – type locality for species
  - †Lepidospirifer demissus – type locality for species
  - †Lepidospirifer inferus
- †Leptagonia
- †Leptalosia
  - †Leptalosia ovalis
- †Leptodesma
  - †Leptodesma falcata
  - †Leptodesma gouldii
  - †Leptodesma guadalupensis
- †Leptodus
  - †Leptodus americana
  - †Leptodus guadalupensis – type locality for species
- †Leptomphalus
  - †Leptomphalus micidus – type locality for species
- †Leptoplastides
- †Leptoptygma
  - †Leptoptygma subtilistriatum
- †Leptotygria
- †Lercaritubus
  - †Lercaritubus problematicus
- †Lesueurilla
- †Leurosina – type locality for genus
  - †Leurosina delicata
  - †Leurosina lata – type locality for species
  - †Leurosina marginata
  - †Leurosina serratoseptata
  - †Leurosina sinesulca
  - †Leurosina vulgarica
- Life restoration of the Early Ordovician nautiloid cephalopod Levisoceras
  †Levisoceras
  - †Levisoceras contractum – type locality for species
- †Levizygopleura
  - †Levizygopleura williamsi
- †Lichenaria
- †Limatulina – report made of unidentified related form or using admittedly obsolete nomenclature
  - †Limatulina striaticostata – type locality for species
- †Limbella
  - †Limbella costata
  - †Limbella costellata
  - †Limbella limbata – type locality for species
  - †Limbella victorioensis
  - †Limbella wolfcampensis – type locality for species
- †Lindostromella
  - †Lindostromella patula
- †Lindstroemia – report made of unidentified related form or using admittedly obsolete nomenclature
  - †Lindstroemia cylindrica – type locality for species
  - †Lindstroemia permiana
- Lingula
- †Linipalus
  - †Linipalus magnispinus
- †Linoproductus
  - †Linoproductus cora
  - †Linoproductus delicatus
  - †Linoproductus meniscus
  - †Linoproductus nasutus – type locality for species
  - †Linoproductus phosphaticus
  - †Linoproductus prattenianus
  - †Linoproductus waagenianus
- †Liosotella
  - †Liosotella costata – type locality for species
  - †Liosotella irregularis – type locality for species
  - †Liosotella opima – type locality for species
  - †Liosotella parva – type locality for species
  - †Liosotella popei – type locality for species
  - †Liosotella rotunda
  - †Liosotella spinumbona
  - †Liosotella tetragonalis – type locality for species
  - †Liosotella texana
  - †Liosotella wordensis – type locality for species
- †Liraria
  - †Liraria lirata
- †Lirellaria
  - †Lirellaria costellata
  - †Lirellaria crassa
  - †Lirellaria diabloensis
- †Liroceras
  - †Liroceras globulare
- †Lissochonetes
  - †Lissochonetes geinitzianus
  - †Lissochonetes parvisulcatus
- †Lithostrotionella – tentative report
- †Llanoaspis
  - †Llanoaspis virginica
- †Llanoceras – type locality for genus
  - †Llanoceras gracile – type locality for species
- †Llanocystis – type locality for genus
  - †Llanocystis wilbernsensis – type locality for species
- †Lobatannularia
- †Lophonema
- †Lophophyllidium
  - †Lophophyllidium absitum – type locality for species
  - †Lophophyllidium compressum
  - †Lophophyllidium confertum – or unidentified comparable form
  - †Lophophyllidium cyathaxoniaforme – type locality for species
  - †Lophophyllidium distortum
  - †Lophophyllidium dunbari
  - †Lophophyllidium erugum – type locality for species
  - †Lophophyllidium lanosum – type locality for species
  - †Lophophyllidium magnocolumnare – type locality for species
  - †Lophophyllidium plummeri – type locality for species
  - †Lophophyllidium profundum
  - †Lophophyllidium proliferum
  - †Lophophyllidium radicosum
  - †Lophophyllidium skinneri – type locality for species
  - †Lophophyllidium texanum
  - †Lophophyllidium vallum – type locality for species
  - †Lophophyllidium vidriensis – type locality for species
  - †Lophophyllidium westii
  - †Lophophyllidium wewokanum
- †Lophotichium
  - †Lophotichium dugoutense – type locality for species
  - †Lophotichium rotundiseptum – type locality for species
  - †Lophotichium simulatum – type locality for species
- †Lowenstamia – type locality for genus
  - †Lowenstamia ampla
  - †Lowenstamia texana – type locality for species
- †Loxonema – report made of unidentified related form or using admittedly obsolete nomenclature
  - †Loxonema inconspicuum – type locality for species
- †Loxophragmus – type locality for genus
  - †Loxophragmus ellipticus – type locality for species
- †Luederia – type locality for genus
  - †Luederia kempi – type locality for species
- †Luterospongia – type locality for genus
  - †Luterospongia texana – type locality for species
- †Lyroschizodus
  - †Lyroschizodus oklahomensis
  - †Lyroschizodus orbicularis – type locality for species
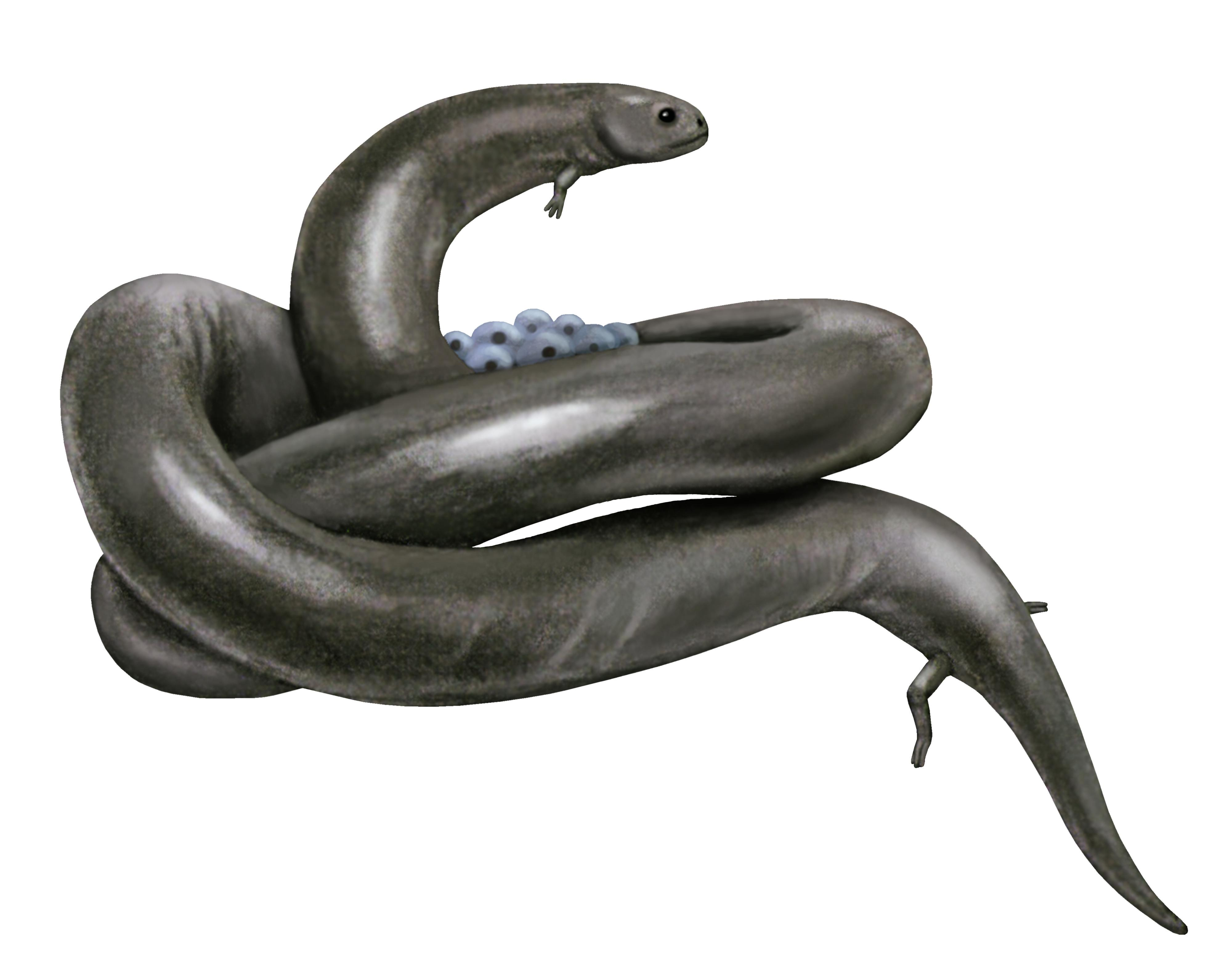
- Life restoration of the Permian snake-like amphibian Lysorophus showing speculative egg-coiling behavior
  †Lysorophus
  - †Lysorophus tricarinatus
- †Lytvolasma
  - †Lytvolasma aucta – type locality for species

== M ==
- †Mackinneyella
  - †Mackinneyella hinganensis – or unidentified related form
  - †Mackinneyella praepluriformis – or unidentified comparable form
  - †Mackinneyella robustiformis
- †Macluritella
  - †Macluritella gyroceras
  - †Macluritella uniangulata
- †Macrochilina – report made of unidentified related form or using admittedly obsolete nomenclature
  - †Macrochilina modesta – type locality for species
- †Macrodontacanthus – type locality for genus
  - †Macrodontacanthus kingi – type locality for species
- †Macroporella
  - †Macroporella verticillata – type locality for species
- †Madarosia
  - †Madarosia anterolamellata
  - †Madarosia pentagona
- †Maeandrostia
  - †Maeandrostia kansasensis
- †Manipora
  - †Manipora amicarum
  - †Manipora magna – type locality for species
  - †Manipora trapezoidalis – type locality for species
- †Manzanospira
  - †Manzanospira carinata
  - †Manzanospira manzanicum
  - †Manzanospira wordensis – type locality for species
- †Marathonites
  - †Marathonites jpsmithi – type locality for species
  - †Marathonites moorei – type locality for species
  - †Marathonites vidriensis – type locality for species
- †Marginatia
- †Marginifera
  - †Marginifera cristobalensis
  - †Marginifera manzanica
  - †Marginifera opima
  - †Marginifera texana
- †Martinia
  - †Martinia causaria
  - †Martinia cruenta
  - †Martinia exigua
  - †Martinia fucina
  - †Martinia miranda – type locality for species
  - †Martinia nealranchensis
  - †Martinia rhomboidalis
  - †Martinia wolfcampensis – type locality for species
- †Mastersonia – type locality for genus
  - †Mastersonia driverensis – type locality for species
- †Mckittrickella – type locality for genus
  - †Mckittrickella pratti – type locality for species
- †Mcqueenoceras
- †Meandrostia
  - †Meandrostia tortacloaca
- †Medlicottia
  - †Medlicottia arroyoensis – type locality for species
  - †Medlicottia chozaensis – type locality for species
  - †Medlicottia copei – type locality for species
  - †Medlicottia costellifera – type locality for species
  - †Medlicottia kingorum – type locality for species
  - †Medlicottia milleri – type locality for species
- †Meekella
  - †Meekella angustiplicata
  - †Meekella attenuata
  - †Meekella calathica – type locality for species
  - †Meekella caperata – type locality for species
  - †Meekella circularis
  - †Meekella enormis – type locality for species
  - †Meekella hessensis – type locality for species
  - †Meekella intermedia
  - †Meekella magnifica – type locality for species
  - †Meekella mexicana
  - †Meekella multilirata – type locality for species
  - †Meekella occidentalis – type locality for species
  - †Meekella prionota – type locality for species
  - †Meekella skenoides
  - †Meekella striaticostata
  - †Meekella striatocostata
  - †Meekella texana – type locality for species
- †Meekopora
- †Meekospira
  - †Meekospira choctawensis
  - †Meekospira mimiae – type locality for species
  - †Meekospira peracuta
- †Megactenopetalus
  - †Megactenopetalus kaibabanus
- †Megousia
  - †Megousia auriculata
  - †Megousia definita – type locality for species
  - †Megousia flexuosa
  - †Megousia girtyi – type locality for species
  - †Megousia mucronata
  - †Megousia umbonata
  - †Megousia waageniana – type locality for species
- †Merista
  - †Merista maccullochensis – type locality for species
- †Mesolobus
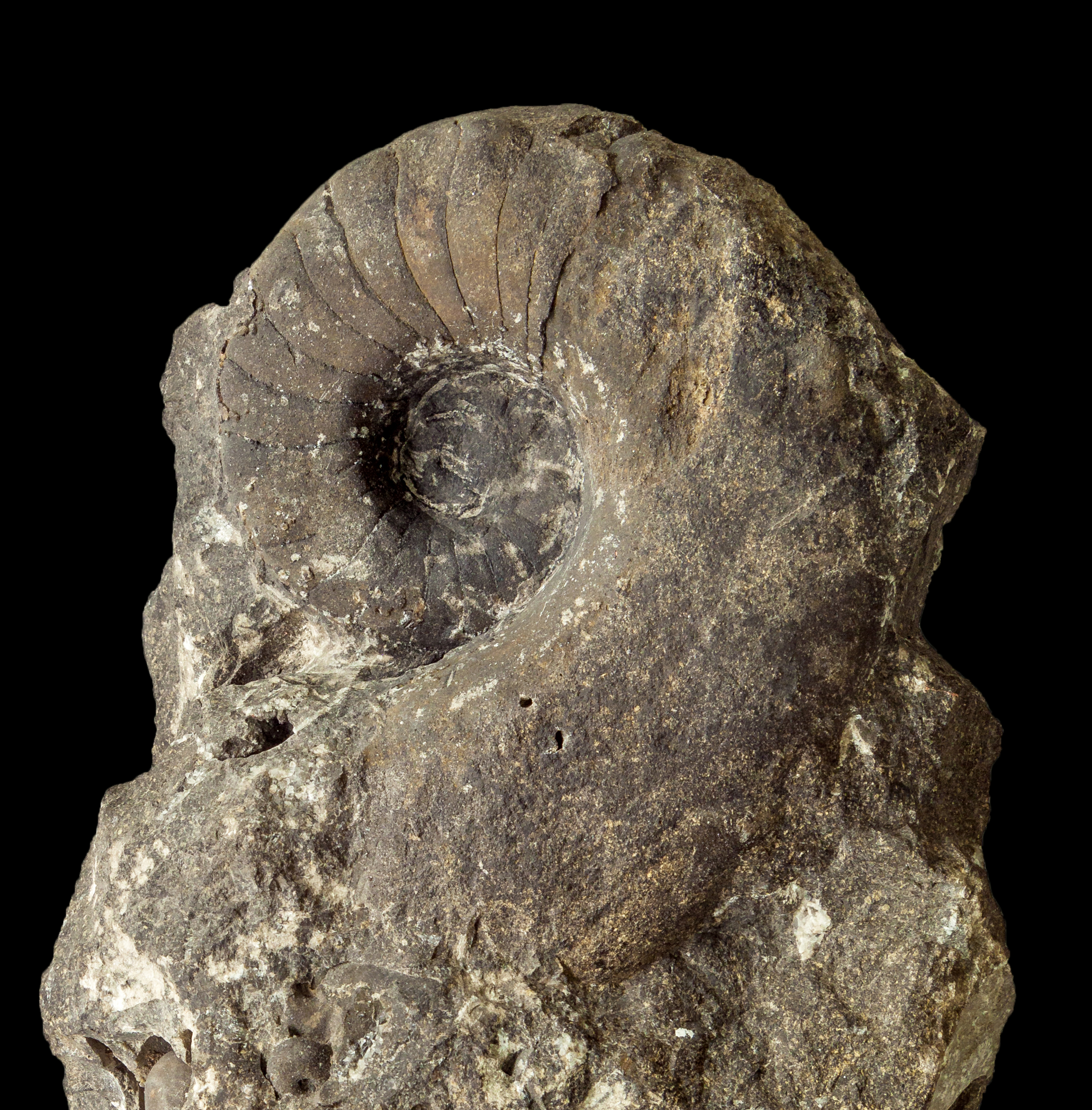
- Fossilized shell of the Carboniferous-Permian nautiloid cephalopod Metacoceras
  †Metacoceras
  - †Metacoceras baylorense – type locality for species
  - †Metacoceras cheneyi – type locality for species
  - †Metacoceras inconspicuum
- †Metacrimites
  - †Metacrimites adamsi – type locality for species
  - †Metacrimites defordi – type locality for species
  - †Metacrimites marathonensis – type locality for species
  - †Metacrimites newelli – type locality for species
- †Metaindocrinus
  - †Metaindocrinus cooperi – type locality for species
- †Metalegoceras
  - †Metalegoceras aricki – type locality for species
  - †Metalegoceras baylorense – type locality for species
  - †Metalegoceras schucherti – type locality for species
- †Metaperrinites
  - †Metaperrinites cumminsi – type locality for species
  - †Metaperrinites vicinus
- †Metapronorites
  - †Metapronorites pseudotimorensis
- †Metarmosaurus – type locality for genus
  - †Metarmosaurus fossatus – type locality for species
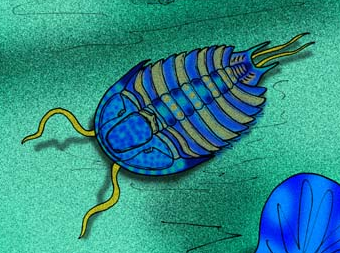
- Restoration of the Cambrian trilobite Meteoraspis
  †Meteoraspis
  - †Meteoraspis metra
- †Metoptoma
  - †Metoptoma texana – type locality for species
- †Metriolepis – type locality for genus
  - †Metriolepis carotica
  - †Metriolepis diabloensis
  - †Metriolepis exserta
  - †Metriolepis irenae
  - †Metriolepis larina
  - †Metriolepis nabis
  - †Metriolepis pedicosa
  - †Metriolepis pinea
  - †Metriolepis pulvinata – type locality for species
  - †Metriolepis scrupea
  - †Metriolepis tegulata – type locality for species
  - †Metriolepis ziczac – type locality for species
- †Mexicoceras
  - †Mexicoceras guadalupense – type locality for species
- †Michelinoceras – tentative report
  - †Michelinoceras guadalupense – type locality for species
- †Micraphelia
  - †Micraphelia pumilis
  - †Micraphelia scitula
  - †Micraphelia subalata
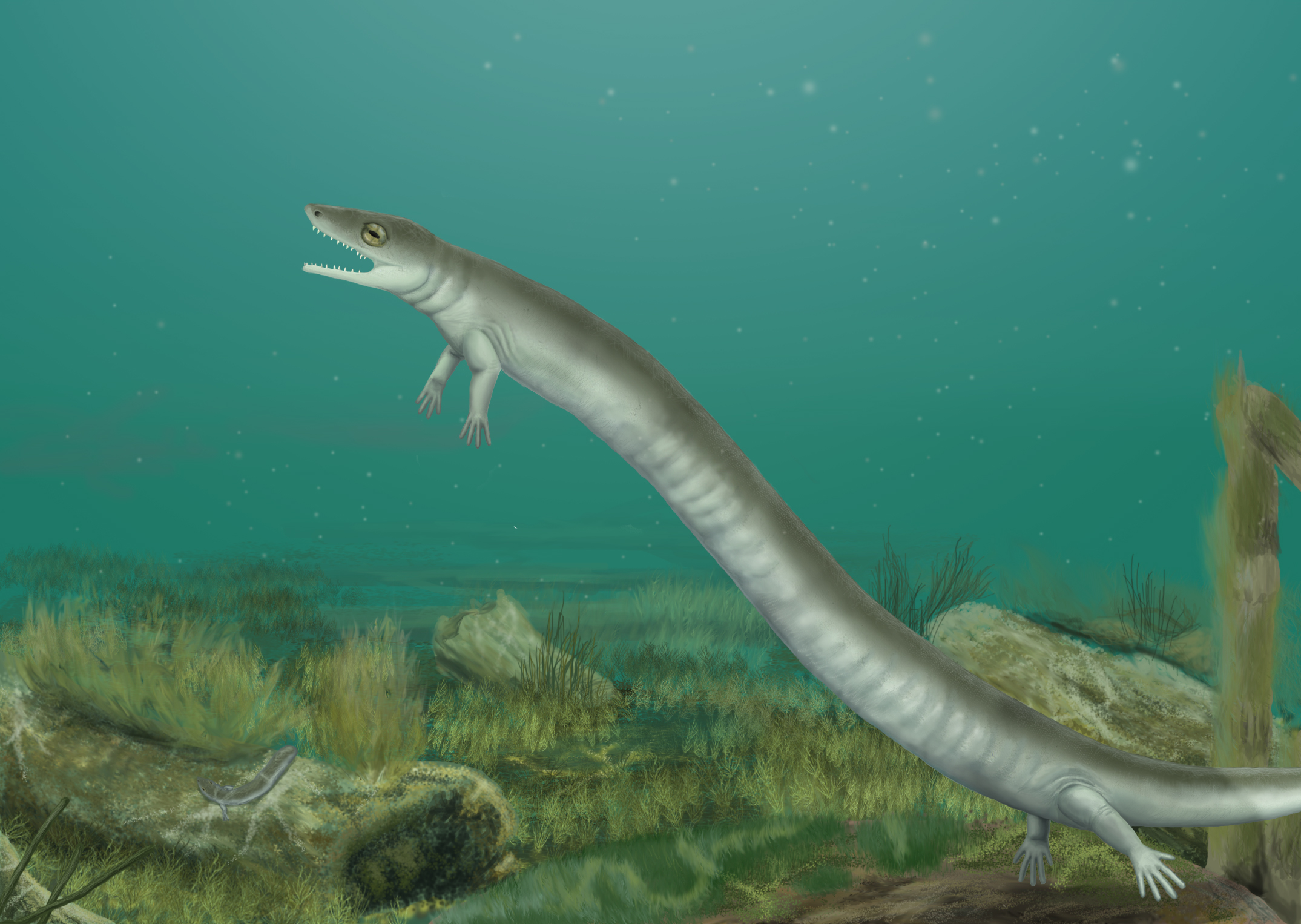
- Life restoration of the Permian amphibian Micraroter
  †Micraroter – tentative report
  - †Micraroter erythrogeios
- †Microantyx
  - †Microantyx botoni
  - †Microantyx mudgei
- †Microbaltoceras – type locality for genus
  - †Microbaltoceras minore – type locality for species
- †Microdoma
  - †Microdoma conicum
  - †Microdoma gavinae
- †Microptychis
  - †Microptychis insolita – type locality for species
- †Microstaura – type locality for genus
  - †Microstaura doliolum
- †Microstaurella – type locality for genus
  - †Microstaurella minima – type locality for species
  - †Microstaurella parva – type locality for species
- †Millerella
  - †Millerella marblensis
- †Millkoninckioceras
  - †Millkoninckioceras bibbi
- †Miltonella – type locality for genus
  - †Miltonella shupei – type locality for species
- †Minammodytes
- †Minilya
  - †Minilya girtyi
- †Minispongia
  - †Minispongia constricta – type locality for species
- †Mizzia
  - †Mizzia velebitana
- †Monaxoradiata – type locality for genus
  - †Monaxoradiata lamina – type locality for species
- †Monodiexodina
  - †Monodiexodina bispatulata
  - †Monodiexodina linearis – tentative report
- †Monophyllum
  - †Monophyllum cassum – type locality for species
- †Monotis – tentative report
- †Moorefieldella
- †Mooreoceras
  - †Mooreoceras giganteum – type locality for species
- †Mooreocrinus
  - †Mooreocrinus magdalensis – type locality for species
- †Moreauoceras
  - †Moreauoceras milleri
- †Morrowcrinus – tentative report
- †Mourlonia
- †Multistella – type locality for genus
  - †Multistella porosa
- †Murchisonia
  - †Murchisonia gouldi
- †Muriceras – type locality for genus
  - †Muriceras anomalum – type locality for species
  - †Muriceras curviseptatum – type locality for species
  - †Muriceras gracile – type locality for species
  - †Muriceras hebetum – type locality for species
  - †Muriceras micromurus – type locality for species
  - †Muriceras moderatum – type locality for species
  - †Muriceras murus – type locality for species
- †Myalina
  - †Myalina acutirostris – type locality for species
  - †Myalina aviculoides
  - †Myalina copei – type locality for species
  - †Myalina lamellosa – type locality for species
  - †Myalina permiana
  - †Myalina plicata – type locality for species
  - †Myalina pliopetina – type locality for species
  - †Myalina recta – tentative report
  - †Myalina squamosa – tentative report
  - †Myalina wyomingensis – tentative report
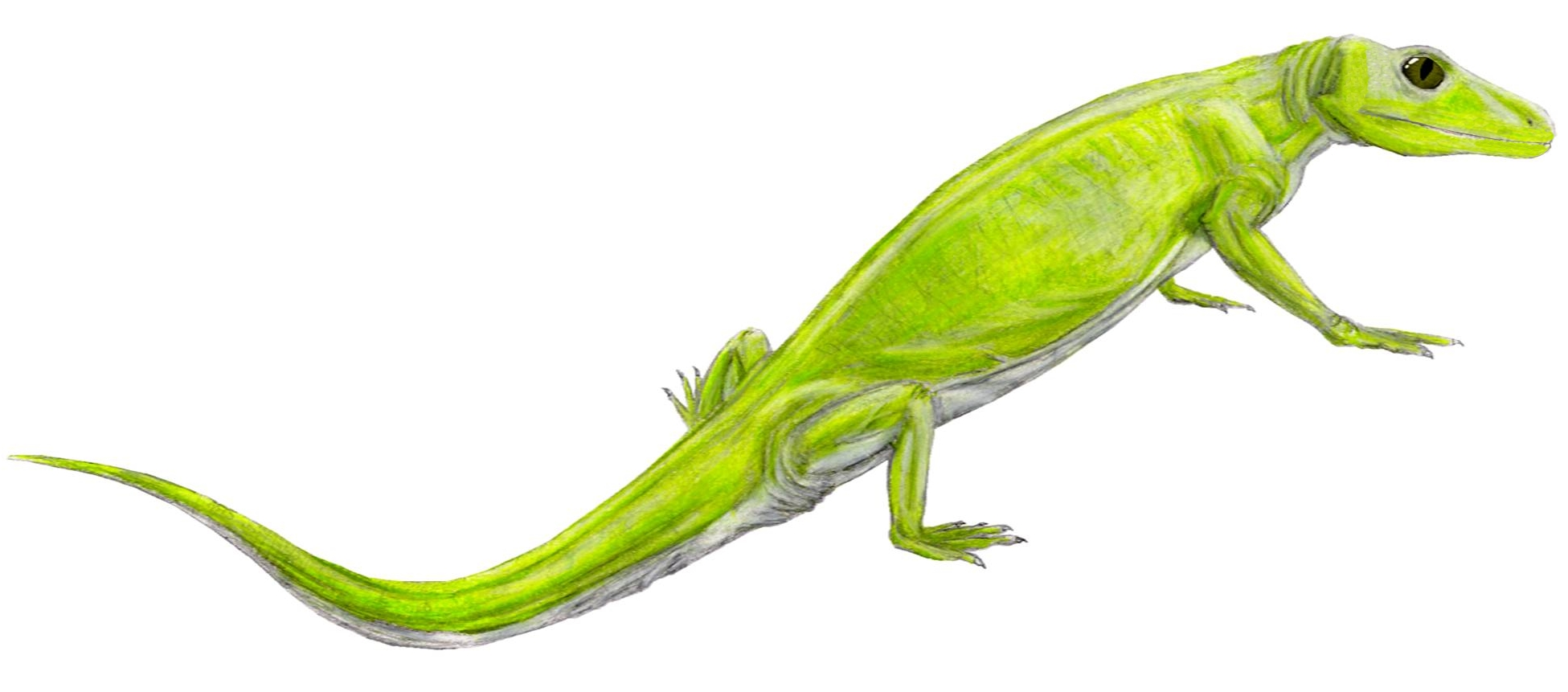
- Life restoration of the Permian synapsid (mammal precursor) Mycterosaurus
  †Mycterosaurus – type locality for genus
  - †Mycterosaurus longiceps – type locality for species
- †Myoconcha
  - †Myoconcha costulata – type locality for species

== N ==
- †Nabespecha
  - †Nabespecha leonardia – type locality for species
- †Nanobamus – type locality for genus
  - †Nanobamus macrorhinus – type locality for species
- †Nasocephalus
  - †Nasocephalus flabellatus
  - †Nasocephalus nasutus
- †Naticopsis
  - †Naticopsis judithae
  - †Naticopsis remex
  - †Naticopsis shumardi – tentative report
  - †Naticopsis transversa – type locality for species
- †Neilsonia
  - †Neilsonia laticincta
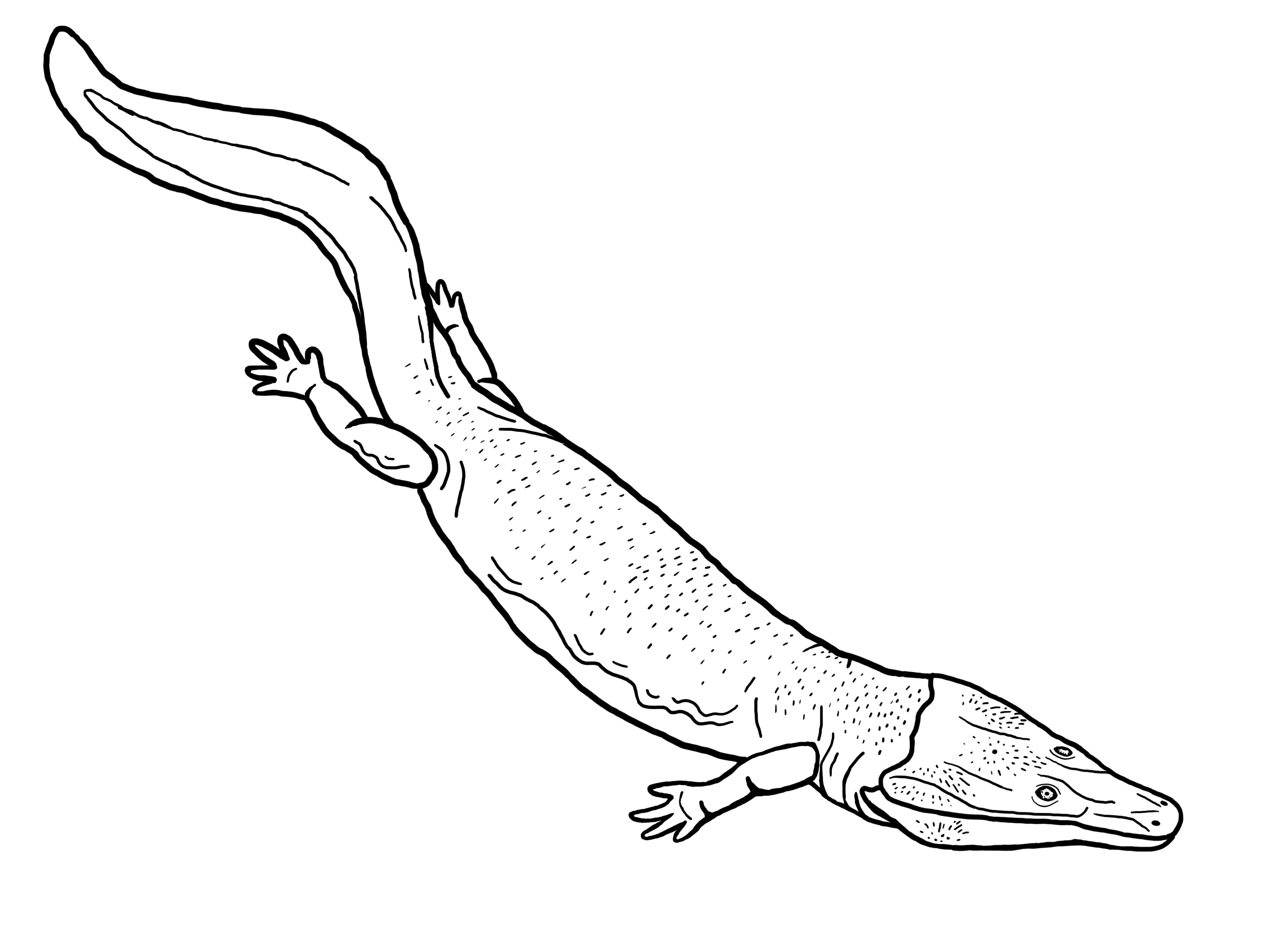
- Neldasaurus
  †Neldasaurus
  - †Neldasaurus wrightae
- †Nemejcopteris
- †Neoaganides
  - †Neoaganides grahamensis
- †Neocalamites – or unidentified comparable form
- †Neochonetes
  - †Neochonetes costellata – type locality for species
  - †Neochonetes granulifer
  - †Neochonetes liratus
  - †Neochonetes magna
  - †Neochonetes meekanus – tentative report
  - †Neochonetes parvus
  - †Neochonetes transversalis
  - †Neochonetes victoriana – type locality for species
- †Neocrimites
  - †Neocrimites defordi
  - †Neocrimites type locality for species – informal
- †Neodimorphoceras
  - †Neodimorphoceras lenticulare
  - †Neodimorphoceras oklahomae
  - †Neodimorphoceras plummerae – type locality for species
  - †Neodimorphoceras texanum
- †Neogeoceras
  - †Neogeoceras girtyi
- †Neoglyphioceras
  - †Neoglyphioceras entogonum
- †Neoicoceras
- †Neokoninckophyllum
  - †Neokoninckophyllum cooperi – type locality for species
  - †Neokoninckophyllum deciensis – type locality for species
  - †Neokoninckophyllum dunbari – type locality for species
- †Neophricadothyris
  - †Neophricadothyris conara – type locality for species
  - †Neophricadothyris crassibecca – type locality for species
  - †Neophricadothyris transversa
- †Neopopanoceras
  - †Neopopanoceras bowmani – type locality for species
- †Neopronorites
  - †Neopronorites bakeri – type locality for species
  - †Neopronorites boesei
- †Neoshumardites
  - †Neoshumardites gaptankensis
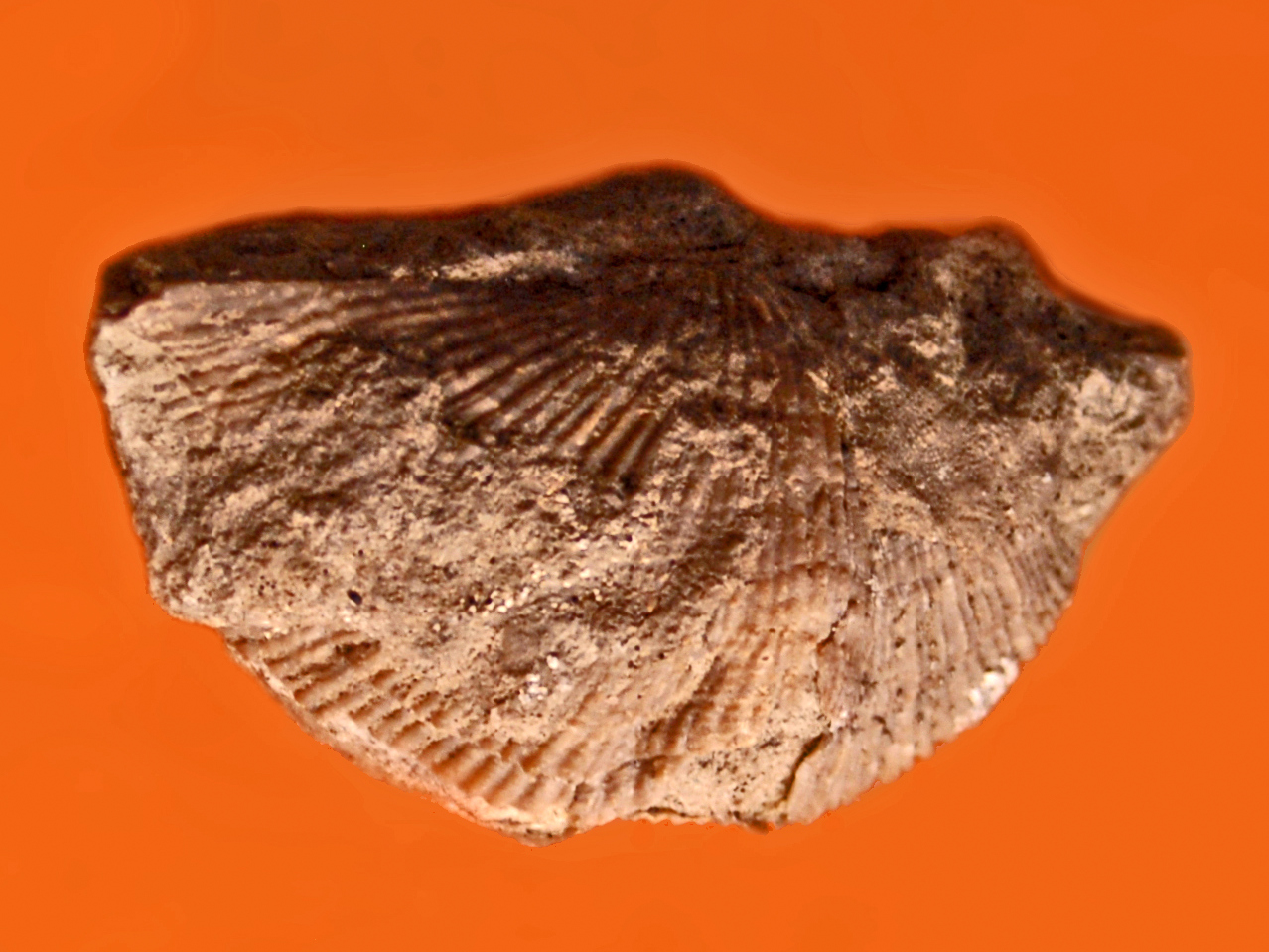
- Fossilized shell of the Carboniferous-Permian brachiopod Neospirifer
  †Neospirifer
  - †Neospirifer amphigyus – type locality for species
  - †Neospirifer apothescelus – type locality for species
  - †Neospirifer bakeri – type locality for species
  - †Neospirifer cameratus – tentative report
  - †Neospirifer formulosus
  - †Neospirifer huecoensis – type locality for species
  - †Neospirifer kansasensis
  - †Neospirifer mansuetus
  - †Neospirifer neali
  - †Neospirifer notialis
  - †Neospirifer placidus
  - †Neospirifer t. – informal
  - †Neospirifer triplicatus
  - †Neospirifer venezuelensis
- †Neotryplasma
- †Neozeacrinus
  - †Neozeacrinus uddeni – type locality for species
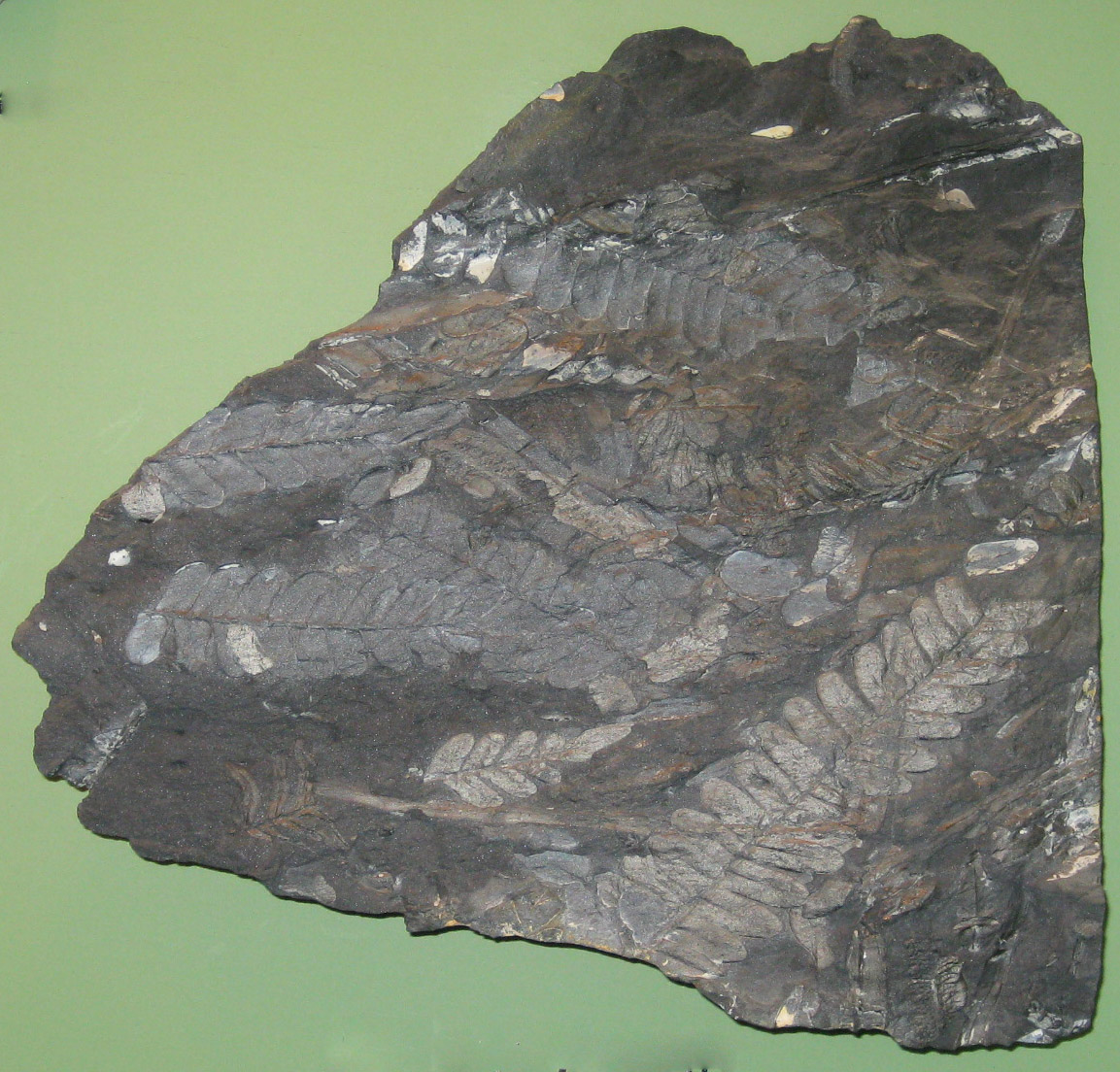
- Fronds of the Carboniferous seed fern Neuropteris
  †Neuropteris
  - †Neuropteris cordata – tentative report
  - †Neuropteris lindahli – or unidentified comparable form
- †Newellites
  - †Newellites richardsoni – type locality for species
- †Newellospongia – type locality for genus
  - †Newellospongia perforata – type locality for species
- †Nicollidina
  - †Nicollidina remscheidensis
- †Nielsenoceras
  - †Nielsenoceras skinneri – type locality for species
- †Niviconia – type locality for genus
  - †Niviconia abrupta
  - †Niviconia globosa
- †Norwoodia
  - †Norwoodia quadrangularis
- †Nothopindax
  - †Nothopindax egregius
- †Notothyris
  - †Notothyris gillilandensis
  - †Notothyris planiplicata
  - †Notothyris venusta – type locality for species
- †Novaculapermia – type locality for genus
  - †Novaculapermia boydi – type locality for species
- †Novlepatella
  - †Novlepatella beedei – type locality for species
  - †Novlepatella parrishi
  - †Novlepatella patella – type locality for species
- †Novoameura
  - †Novoameura vitrumons – type locality for species
- †Nucleospira
  - †Nucleospira cunctata
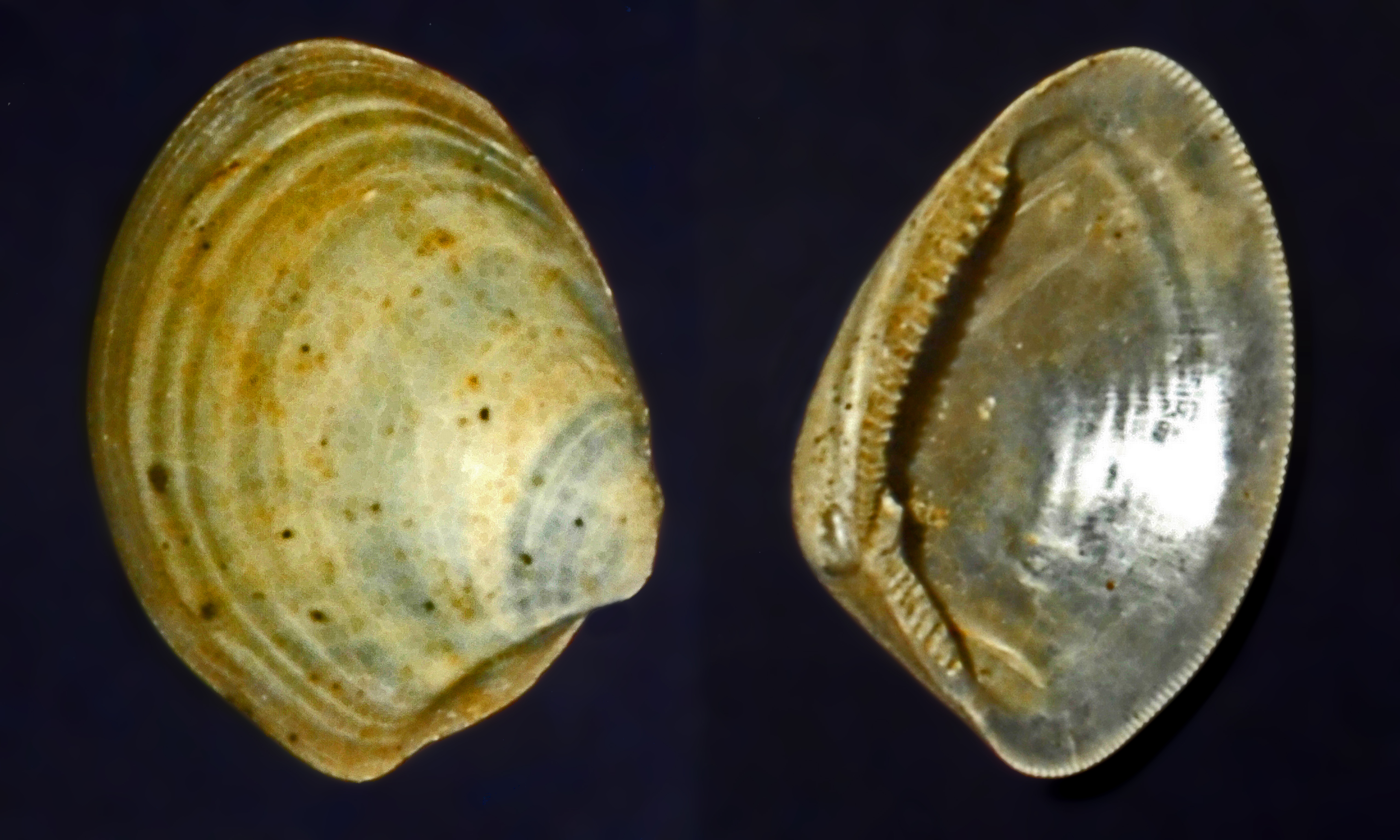
- Interior of a fossilized shell of the Early Ordovician-modern marine bivalve Nucula
  Nucula – report made of unidentified related form or using admittedly obsolete nomenclature
- Nuculana
- †Nuculavus
  - †Nuculavus levatiformis
  - †Nuculavus okawensis – or unidentified related form
- †Nuculopsis
  - †Nuculopsis girtyi
- †Nudauris
  - †Nudauris convexa
  - †Nudauris diabloensis
  - †Nudauris enigmatica – type locality for species
  - †Nudauris linospina – type locality for species
  - †Nudauris reticulata – type locality for species
  - †Nudauris splendens – type locality for species
  - †Nudauris transversa
  - †Nudauris tribulosa
  - †Nudauris whitei
- †Nuia
  - †Nuia siberica
- †Nybyoceras
  - †Nybyoceras montoyense
- †Nyctopora
  - †Nyctopora mutabilis – type locality for species
  - †Nyctopora nondescripta – type locality for species

== O ==
- †Obliquipecten
  - †Obliquipecten granti
- †Ochmazochiton – type locality for genus
  - †Ochmazochiton comptus – type locality for species
- †Odonopteris
- †Odontopteris
  - †Odontopteris conferta
  - †Odontopteris fischeri
  - †Odontopteris genuina
  - †Odontopteris neuropteroides
  - †Odontopteris osmundaeformis – or unidentified comparable form
- †Oistodus
- †Oldhamina – tentative report
- †Olenus
- †Oligorthis
  - †Oligorthis arbucklensis
- †Ombonia
  - †Ombonia guadalupensis
  - †Ombonia invecta
- †Omphalotrochus
  - †Omphalotrochus alleni – type locality for species
  - †Omphalotrochus cochisensis – type locality for species
  - †Omphalotrochus hessensis – type locality for species
  - †Omphalotrochus obtusispira – type locality for species
  - †Omphalotrochus spinosus – type locality for species
  - †Omphalotrochus wolfcampensis – type locality for species
- †Oncosarina
  - †Oncosarina rotunda
  - †Oncosarina spinicostata – type locality for species
  - †Oncosarina whitei
- †Oneotoceras
- †Onniella
  - †Onniella plicata – type locality for species
  - †Onniella quadrata
- †Onychochilus
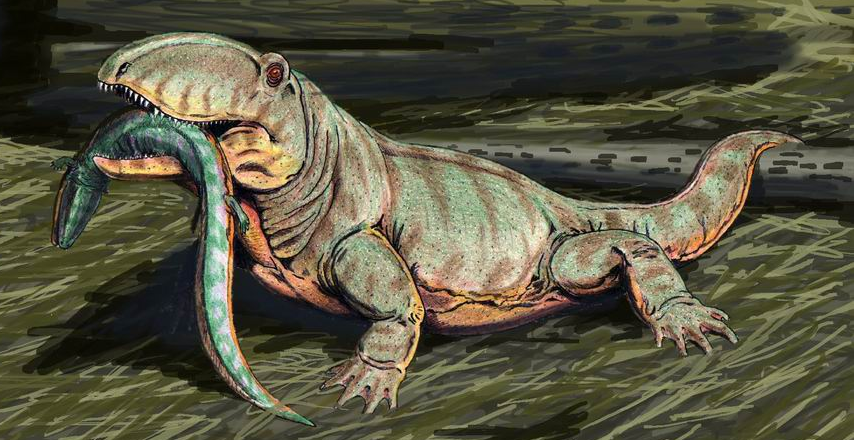
- Life restoration of the Carboniferous-Permian synapsid (mammal precursor) Ophiacodon
  †Ophiacodon – type locality for genus
  - †Ophiacodon major – type locality for species
  - †Ophiacodon retroversus – type locality for species
  - †Ophiacodon uniformis – type locality for species
- †Ophileta
  - †Ophileta polygyratus
  - †Ophileta rotuliformis
- †Opisthotreta
  - †Opisthotreta depressa
- †Orbicoelia
  - †Orbicoelia guadalupensis
  - †Orbicoelia inflata
  - †Orbicoelia tholiaphor – type locality for species
  - †Orbicoelia tumibilis
- †Orbiculoidea
  - †Orbiculoidea missouriensis
- †Ormoceras
  - †Ormoceras dartoni
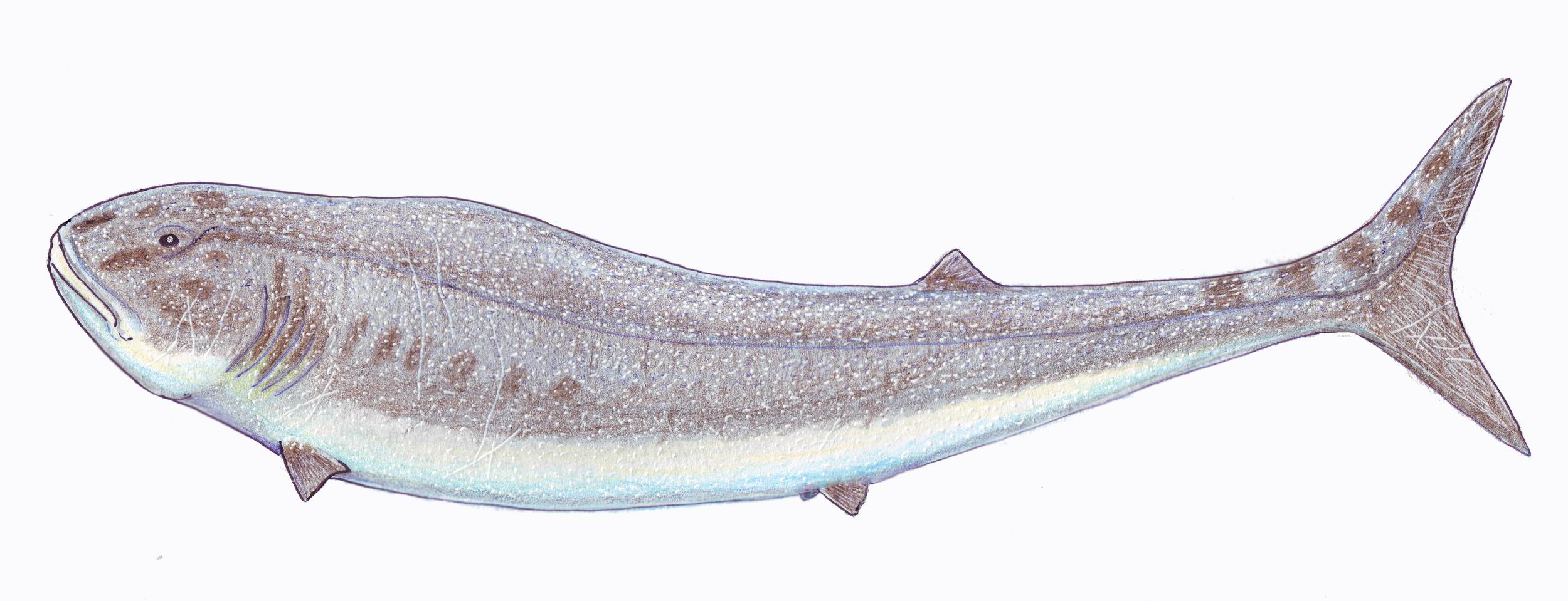
- Restoration of the Carboniferous-Permian cartilaginous fish Orodus
  †Orodus
  - †Orodus corrugatus – type locality for species
- †Orospira
- †Orthacanthus
  - †Orthacanthus compressus
  - †Orthacanthus texensis
- †Orthisina – report made of unidentified related form or using admittedly obsolete nomenclature
- †Orthoceracone
- †Orthograptus
  - †Orthograptus fastigatus
  - †Orthograptus quadrimucronatus
  - †Orthograptus thorsteinssoni
- †Orthomyalina
  - †Orthomyalina subquadrata
- †Orthonema
  - †Orthonema paedice – type locality for species
  - †Orthonema paxillus – type locality for species
  - †Orthonema salteri
  - †Orthonema striatonodosum
  - †Orthonema telescopiforme – type locality for species
- †Orthonychia
  - †Orthonychia bowsheri – type locality for species
- †Orthotetella
  - †Orthotetella wolfcampensis – type locality for species
- †Orthotetes
  - †Orthotetes mutabilis – or unidentified comparable form
- †Orthothetina
- †Orthotichia
  - †Orthotichia hueconiana – type locality for species
  - †Orthotichia irregularis
  - †Orthotichia kozlowskii – type locality for species
  - †Orthotichia newelli – type locality for species
- †Ossimimus – type locality for genus
  - †Ossimimus robustus
- †Ostodolepis – type locality for genus
  - †Ostodolepis brevispinatus – type locality for species
- †Oulodus
  - †Oulodus cristagalli – tentative report
- †Ovatia
- †Oxyprora
  - †Oxyprora capitanensis – type locality for species
  - †Oxyprora missouriensis
- †Ozarkina
  - †Ozarkina typica
- †Ozarkodina
  - †Ozarkodina bohemica
  - †Ozarkodina wurmi – tentative report
- †Ozawainella – tentative report
  - †Ozawainella inflata – type locality for species

== P ==
- †Pachylyroceras
  - †Pachylyroceras cloudi
  - †Pachylyroceras newsomi
- †Padgettia
  - †Padgettia readi – type locality for species
- †Paladin
  - †Paladin helmsensis
- †Palaeanodonta
- †Palaeocaudina
  - †Palaeocaudina kansasensis
- †Palaeoceras – type locality for genus
  - †Palaeoceras mutabile – type locality for species
  - †Palaeoceras undulatum – type locality for species
- †Palaeogeminella
  - †Palaeogeminella folkii
- †Palaeoneilo
  - †Palaeoneilo taffiana
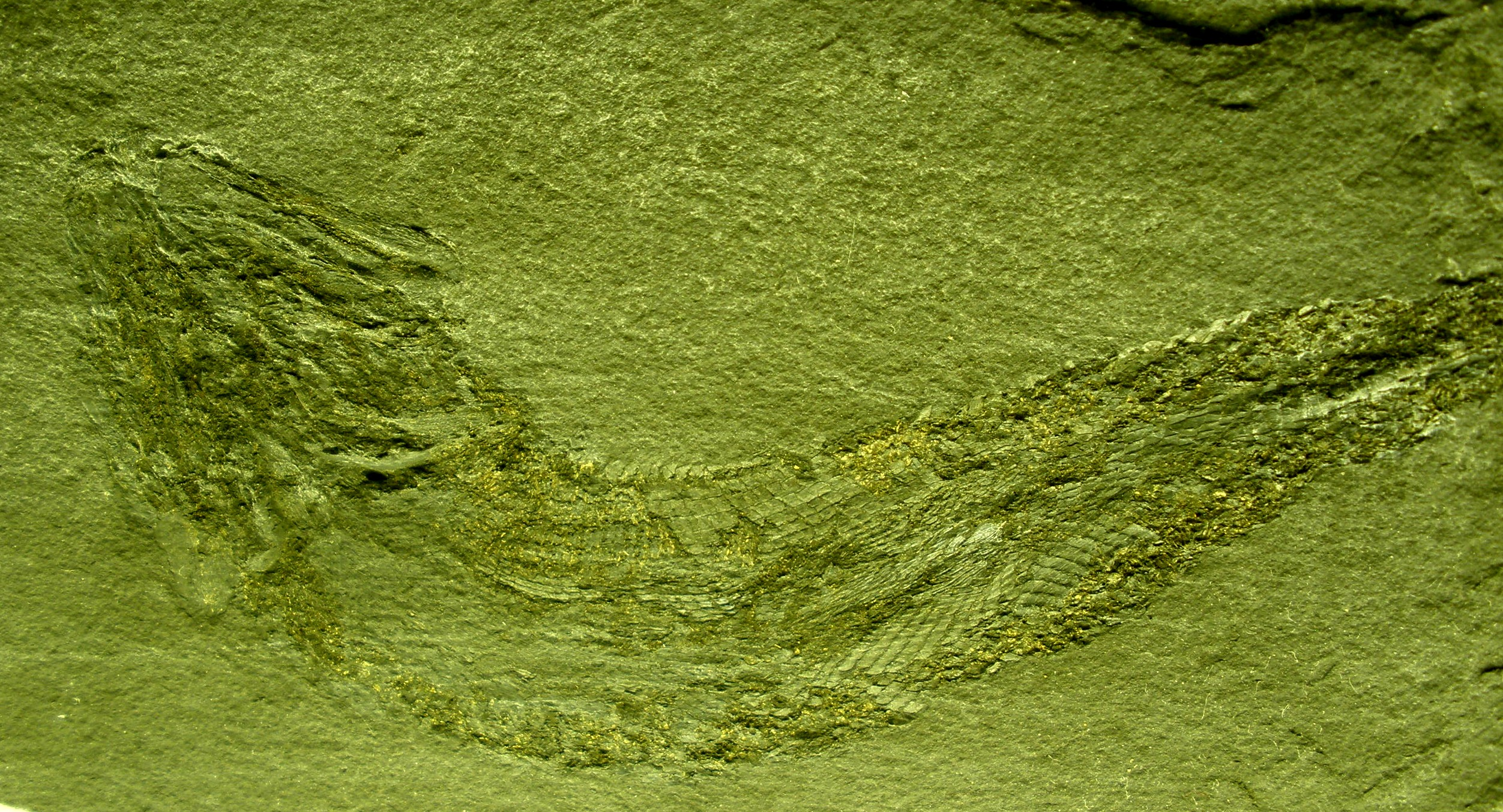
- Fossilized skeleton of the Permian bony fish Palaeoniscum
  †Palaeoniscus – tentative report
- †Palaeophyllum
  - †Palaeophyllum cateniforme – type locality for species
  - †Palaeophyllum gracile – type locality for species
  - †Palaeophyllum margaretae – type locality for species
  - †Palaeophyllum thomi
- †Palaeostylus
- †Paleochiridota
  - †Paleochiridota plummerae
  - †Paleochiridota radiata – type locality for species
  - †Paleochiridota terquemi – type locality for species
  - †Paleochiridota waylandensis – type locality for species
- †Paleofavosites
  - †Paleofavosites kuellmeri – type locality for species
  - †Paleofavosites prayi – type locality for species
  - †Paleofavosites sparsus – type locality for species
- †Paleowaagia
  - †Paleowaagia cooperi – type locality for species
- †Paleyoldia
  - †Paleyoldia glabra
- †Panderodus
  - †Panderodus equicostatus
  - †Panderodus panderi
  - †Panderodus unicostatus
- †Panduralimulus – type locality for genus
  - †Panduralimulus babcocki – type locality for species
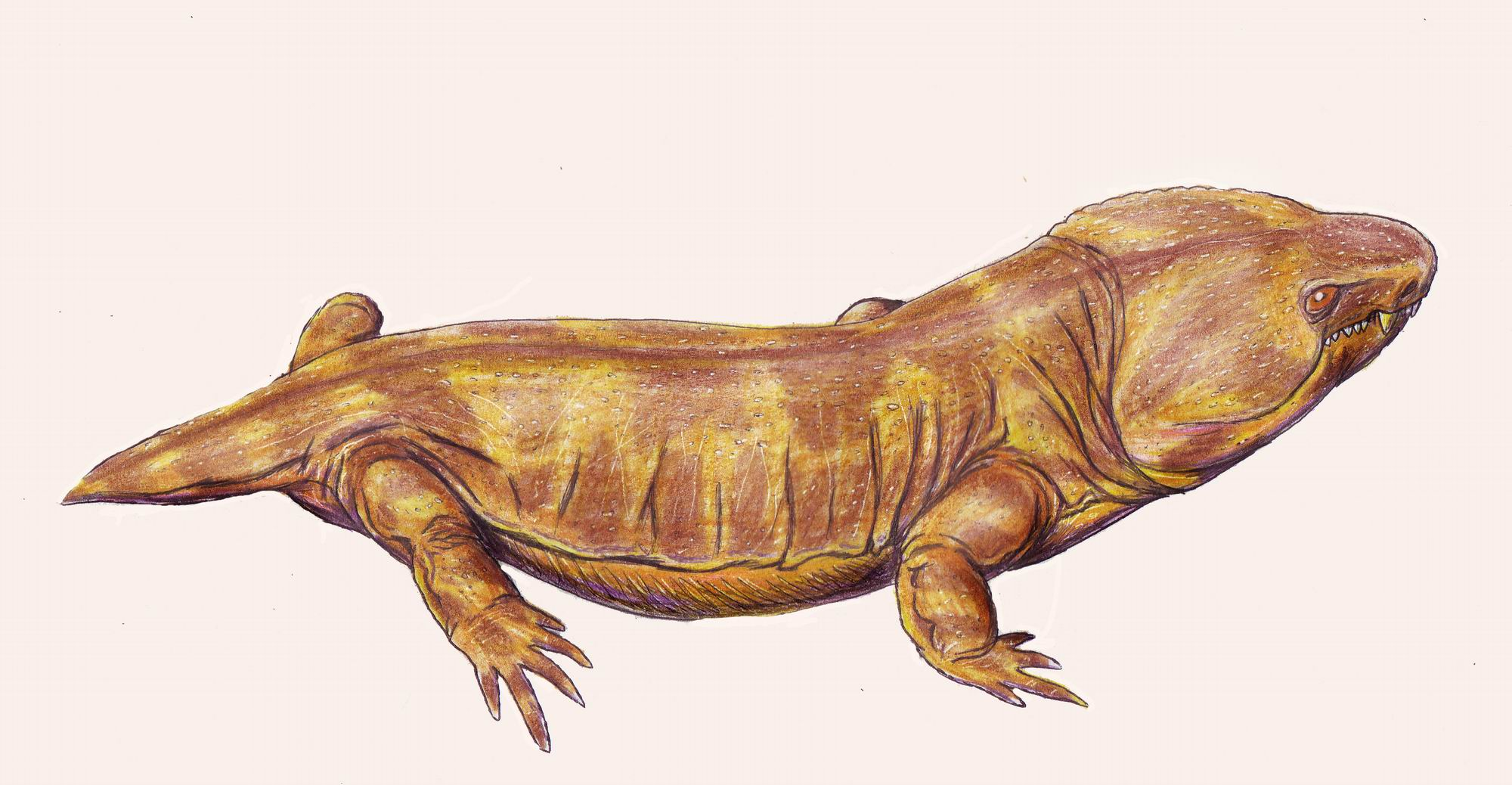
- Pantylus
  †Pantylus – type locality for genus
  - †Pantylus coicodus – type locality for species
  - †Pantylus cordatus – type locality for species
- †Parabolinella
  - †Parabolinella triarthroides – tentative report
  - †Parabolinella triathroides – tentative report
- †Paraboultonia – type locality for genus
  - †Paraboultonia splendens – type locality for species
- †Paraceltites
  - †Paraceltites altudensis – type locality for species
  - †Paraceltites elegans
  - †Paraceltites multicostatus – type locality for species
  - †Paraceltites ornatus
- †Paraconularia
  - †Paraconularia leonardensis
- †Paracravenoceras
  - †Paracravenoceras barnettense – type locality for species
  - †Paracravenoceras ozarkense
- †Paraduplophyllum
  - †Paraduplophyllum amplexoides – type locality for species
  - †Paraduplophyllum multiplicatum – type locality for species
  - †Paraduplophyllum nealranchense – type locality for species
  - †Paraduplophyllum oppositum – type locality for species
  - †Paraduplophyllum tubaeformis – type locality for species
  - †Paraduplophyllum vermiculare – type locality for species
- †Parafenestralia
  - †Parafenestralia gregalis – or unidentified comparable form
- †Parafusulina
  - †Parafusulina amoena – type locality for species
- †Paragastrioceras
  - †Paragastrioceras type locality for species – informal
- †Paragoniozona
  - †Paragoniozona granulostriata
  - †Paragoniozona multilirata – or unidentified comparable form
  - †Paragoniozona nodolirata – or unidentified comparable form
- †Paraheritschioides
  - †Paraheritschioides californiense
- †Parahystricurus
- †Parajuresania
  - †Parajuresania nebrascensis
- †Paralegoceras
  - †Paralegoceras texanum – type locality for species
- †Parallelodon
  - †Parallelodon multistriatus
- †Paralleynia – tentative report
  - †Paralleynia acclinis – type locality for species
- †Paramphicrinus
- †Paranorella
  - †Paranorella aquilonia
  - †Paranorella comptula
- †Paraparchites
  - †Paraparchites marathonensis – type locality for species
- †Parapenascoceras
  - †Parapenascoceras sanandreasense
- †Paraperrinites
  - †Paraperrinites subcumminsi – type locality for species
- †Paraplethopeltis
- †Parapolypora
  - †Parapolypora daurica – or unidentified comparable form
  - †Parapolypora novella – or unidentified comparable form
  - †Parapolypora sparsa – or unidentified related form
- †Parareteograptus
- †Paraschistoceras
  - †Paraschistoceras costiferum – type locality for species
  - †Paraschistoceras hildrethi
  - †Paraschistoceras reticulatum
- †Paraschizodus
  - †Paraschizodus rothi – type locality for species
- †Paraschwagerina
  - †Paraschwagerina shuleri – type locality for species
- †Parashumardites
  - †Parashumardites fornicatus – type locality for species
  - †Parashumardites sellardsi – type locality for species
  - †Parashumardites senex
- †Paraspiriferina
  - †Paraspiriferina amoena
  - †Paraspiriferina billingsi
  - †Paraspiriferina cellulana – type locality for species
  - †Paraspiriferina evax – type locality for species
  - †Paraspiriferina laqueata – type locality for species
  - †Paraspiriferina paginata
  - †Paraspiriferina pulchra
  - †Paraspiriferina rotundata – type locality for species
  - †Paraspiriferina sapinea
  - †Paraspiriferina setulosa
  - †Paraspiriferina sulcata
- †Parauvanella
  - †Parauvanella minima
- †Parenteletes
  - †Parenteletes cooperi
  - †Parenteletes superbus – type locality for species
- †Pariotichus – type locality for genus
  - †Pariotichus brachyops – type locality for species
- †Parioxys – type locality for genus
  - †Parioxys bolli – type locality for species
  - †Parioxys ferricolus – type locality for species
- †Parulocrinus
  - †Parulocrinus americanus – type locality for species
- Patella – tentative report
- †Patellilabia
  - †Patellilabia junior – type locality for species
- †Patellostium
  - †Patellostium ourayensis
- †Paucipora
  - †Paucipora subborealis – or unidentified comparable form
- †Paucispinifera
  - †Paucispinifera auriculata
  - †Paucispinifera comancheana – type locality for species
  - †Paucispinifera costellata – type locality for species
  - †Paucispinifera guadalupensis
  - †Paucispinifera indentata – type locality for species
  - †Paucispinifera intermedia
  - †Paucispinifera latidorsata
  - †Paucispinifera magnispina
  - †Paucispinifera parasulcata
  - †Paucispinifera quadrata – type locality for species
  - †Paucispinifera rara
  - †Paucispinifera rectangulata
  - †Paucispinifera spinosa
  - †Paucispinifera sulcata – type locality for species
  - †Paucispinifera suspecta
  - †Paucispinifera transversa – type locality for species
  - †Paucispinifera tumida
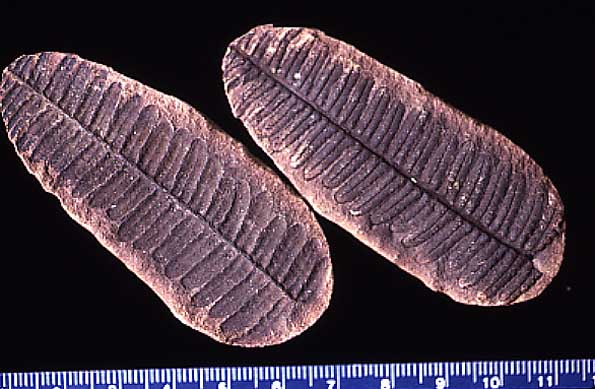
- Fossils of the Late Devonian-Permian fern-like fronds Pecopteris
  †Pecopteris
  - †Pecopteris arborescens
  - †Pecopteris candolleana
  - †Pecopteris densifolia – tentative report
  - †Pecopteris grandifolia
  - †Pecopteris hemitelioides
  - †Pecopteris tenuinervis
  - †Pecopteris unita
- †Pedanochiton – type locality for genus
  - †Pedanochiton discomptus – type locality for species
- †Pedavis
  - †Pedavis biexoramus
- †Pegmavalvula
  - †Pegmavalvula delicata – type locality for species
  - †Pegmavalvula gloveri – type locality for species
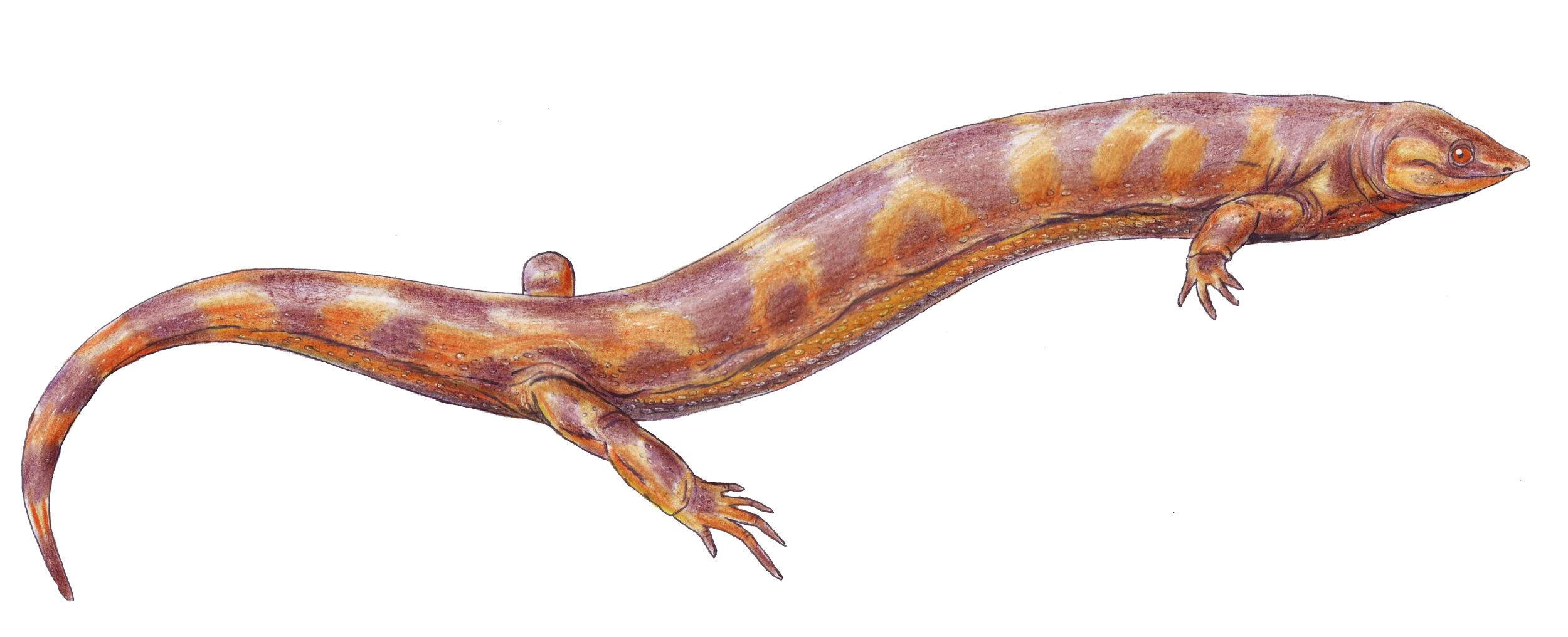
- Life restoration of the Permian amphibian Pelodosotis
  †Pelodosotis – type locality for genus
  - †Pelodosotis elongatum – type locality for species
- †Peniculauris
  - †Peniculauris bassi
  - †Peniculauris costata – type locality for species
  - †Peniculauris imitata
  - †Peniculauris ivesi
  - †Peniculauris peniculifera
  - †Peniculauris subcostata – type locality for species
  - †Peniculauris transversa
- †Penniretepora
- †Pennoceras
  - †Pennoceras seamani – type locality for species
- †Perimestocrinus
  - †Perimestocrinus excavatus – type locality for species
  - †Perimestocrinus moseleyi – type locality for species
- †Peripetoceras
  - †Peripetoceras bridgeportense – type locality for species
- †Peritrochia – type locality for genus
  - †Peritrochia erebus
- †Permanomia
  - †Permanomia texana – type locality for species
- †Permoconcha
  - †Permoconcha conica – type locality for species
  - †Permoconcha tabulata – type locality for species
- †Permocorynella
  - †Permocorynella capitanense – type locality for species
- †Permophorus
  - †Permophorus albequus
  - †Permophorus lunulus – type locality for species
  - †Permophorus mexicanus
- †Permophricodothyris
  - †Permophricodothyris bullata – type locality for species
  - †Permophricodothyris cordata – type locality for species
- †Pernopecten
  - †Pernopecten obliquus
  - †Pernopecten symmetricus
  - †Pernopecten yini
- †Perrinites
  - †Perrinites gouldi – type locality for species
  - †Perrinites hilli – type locality for species
  - †Perrinites tardus – type locality for species
  - †Perrinites vidriensis
- †Peruvispira
  - †Peruvispira delicata
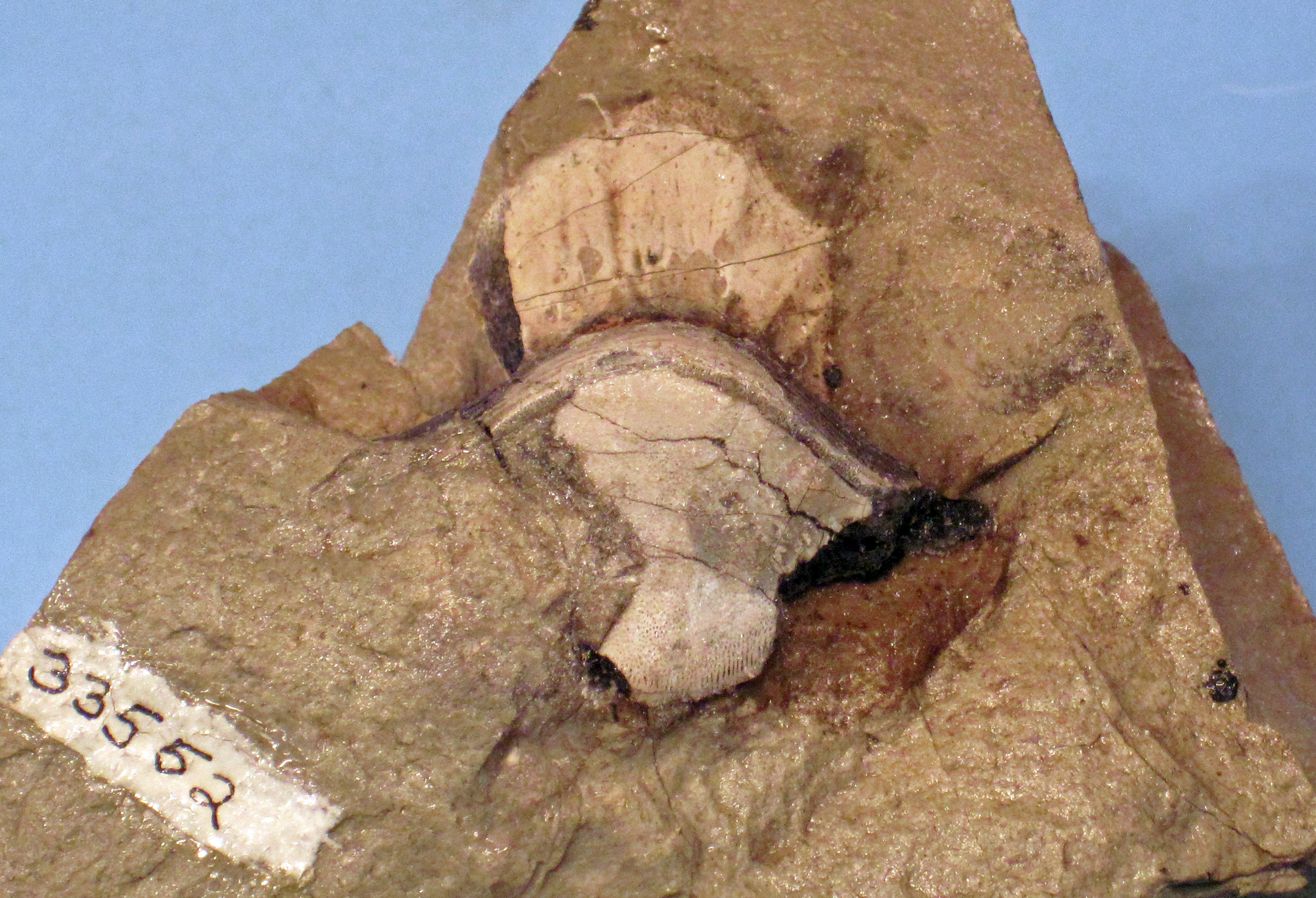
- Fossilized tooth of the Carboniferous-Permian shark Petalodus
  †Petalodus
- †Petasmaia
  - †Petasmaia expansa
- †Petasmatherus
  - †Petasmatherus depressus
  - †Petasmatherus mundus
  - †Petasmatherus nitidus – type locality for species
  - †Petasmatherus opulus – type locality for species
  - †Petasmatherus pumilus – type locality for species
  - †Petasmatherus pusillus
  - †Petasmatherus recticardinatus
- †Petrocrania
  - †Petrocrania diabloensis – type locality for species
  - †Petrocrania exasperata
  - †Petrocrania modesta
  - †Petrocrania septifera – type locality for species
  - †Petrocrania teretis – type locality for species
- †Phaneroceras
  - †Phaneroceras compressum
  - †Phaneroceras lenticulare – type locality for species
- †Phanerotrema – tentative report
- †Pharkidonotus
  - †Pharkidonotus harrodi
  - †Pharkidonotus megalius – or unidentified related form
  - †Pharkidonotus percarinatus
  - †Pharkidonotus westi – type locality for species
- †Phasmatocycas
  - †Phasmatocycas spectabilis – type locality for species
- †Phestia
  - †Phestia bellistriata
- †Philhedra
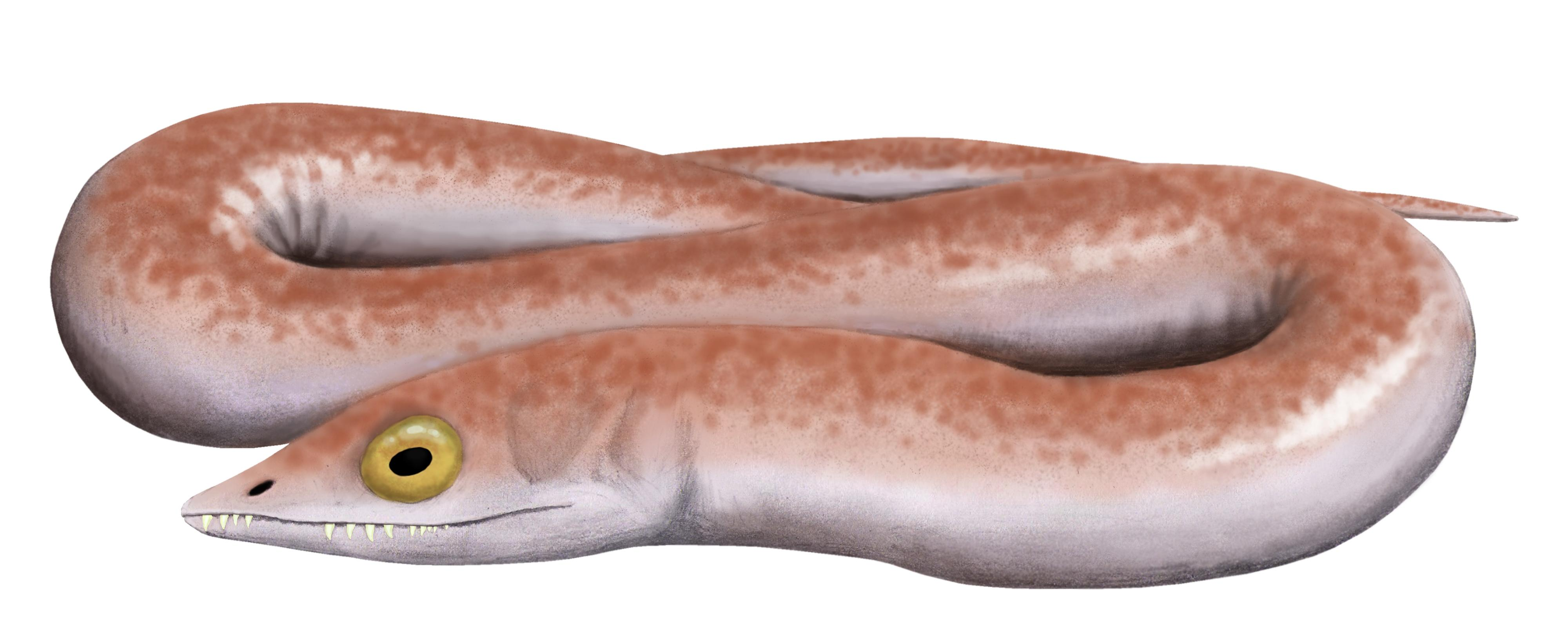
- Life restoration of the Carboniferous-Permian amphibian Phlegethontia.
  †Phlegethontia – tentative report
- †Phonerpeton
  - †Phonerpeton pricei – type locality for species
  - †Phonerpeton whitei – type locality for species
- †Phrenophoria
  - †Phrenophoria anterocostata
  - †Phrenophoria bicostata
  - †Phrenophoria compressa
  - †Phrenophoria corpulenta
  - †Phrenophoria depressa
  - †Phrenophoria incomitata
  - †Phrenophoria irregularis
  - †Phrenophoria nesiotes
  - †Phrenophoria nudumbona – type locality for species
  - †Phrenophoria pentagonalis – type locality for species
  - †Phrenophoria perplexa
  - †Phrenophoria pinguiformis
  - †Phrenophoria pinguis – type locality for species
  - †Phrenophoria planifrons
  - †Phrenophoria planiventra
  - †Phrenophoria repugnans
  - †Phrenophoria subcarinata – type locality for species
  - †Phrenophoria ventricosa – type locality for species
  - †Phrenophoria vetula
- †Phricodothyris
  - †Phricodothyris catatona
  - †Phricodothyris guadalupensis
- †Phymatopleura
  - †Phymatopleura brazoensis
  - †Phymatopleura nodosa
- †Pileochiton – type locality for genus
  - †Pileochiton cancellus – type locality for species
- †Pileolites – type locality for genus
  - †Pileolites baccatus – type locality for species
- †Piloceras
- †Pinnularia
- †Pintoceras – type locality for genus
  - †Pintoceras postvenatum – type locality for species
- †Pirasocrinus
  - †Pirasocrinus invaginatus – type locality for species
- †Pithodea
  - †Pithodea tornatilis – or unidentified comparable form
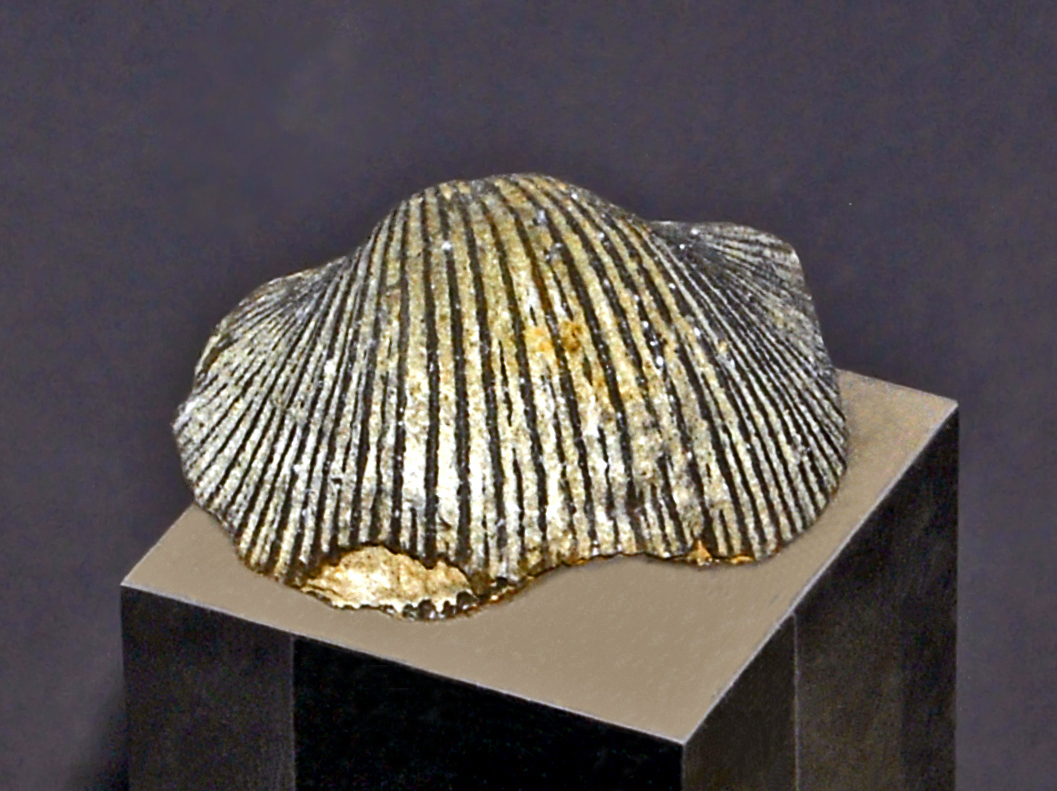
- Fossilized shell of the Ordovician brachiopod Plaesiomys
  †Plaesiomys
  - †Plaesiomys bellistriatus
  - †Plaesiomys subquadrata
- †Plagioglypta
  - †Plagioglypta annulostriata
  - †Plagioglypta girtyi
- †Plagiostoma – report made of unidentified related form or using admittedly obsolete nomenclature
  - †Plagiostoma deltoideum
- †Planispina
  - †Planispina conida
- †Planotectus
  - †Planotectus cymbellatus – type locality for species
- †Platyceras
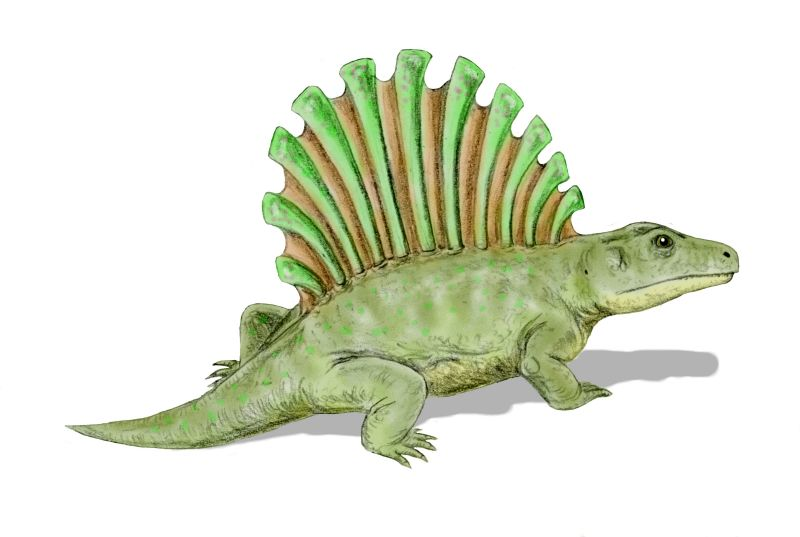
- Life restoration of the Carboniferous-Permian sail-backed amphibian Platyhystrix
  †Platyhystrix – or unidentified comparable form
- †Platysaccus
  - †Platysaccus papilionis
  - †Platysaccus saarensis
- †Platyzona
  - †Platyzona anguispira – type locality for species
  - †Platyzona cancellata – type locality for species
  - †Platyzona pagoda – type locality for species
  - †Platyzona rotunda
- †Plaxocrinus
  - †Plaxocrinus laxus – type locality for species
  - †Plaxocrinus oeconomicus – type locality for species
- †Plectelasma
  - †Plectelasma dubium
  - †Plectelasma guadalupense
  - †Plectelasma kingi
  - †Plectelasma nitidum
  - †Plectelasma planidorsatum
- †Plectospira
  - †Plectospira problematica
- †Plectronoceras
  - †Plectronoceras exile – type locality for species
- †Plerodiffia – type locality for genus
  - †Plerodiffia eaglebuttensis – type locality for species
- †Plethospira
  - †Plethospira rotunda – type locality for species
- †Pleurelasma
  - †Pleurelasma costatum
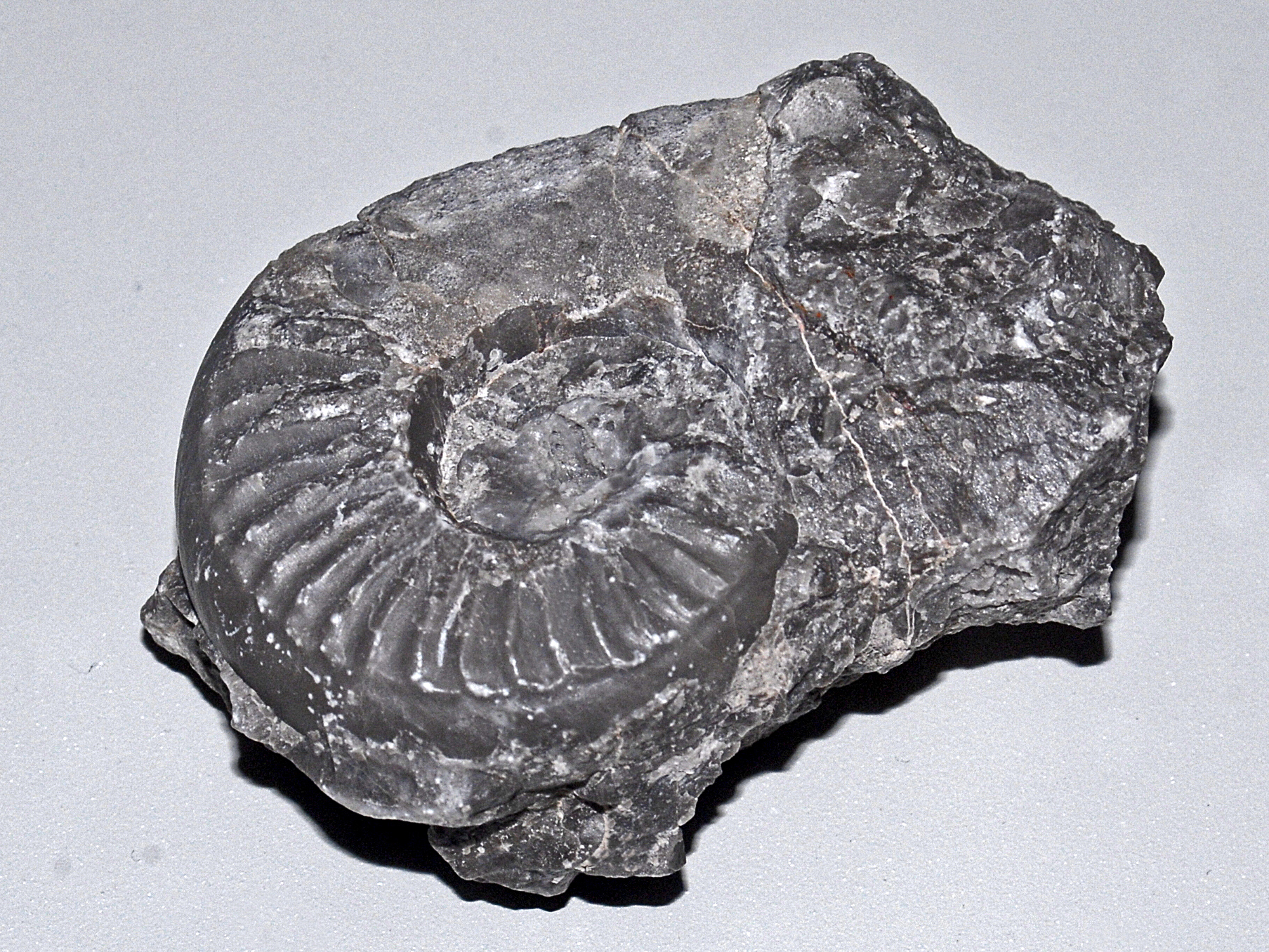
- Fossilized shell of the Carboniferous-Triassic nautiloid cephalopod Pleuronautilus
  †Pleuronautilus
  - †Pleuronautilus cooperi – type locality for species
  - †Pleuronautilus gregarius – type locality for species
  - †Pleuronautilus megaporus – type locality for species
  - †Pleuronautilus mutatus – type locality for species
  - †Pleuronautilus praecursor
  - †Pleuronautilus shumardianus
- †Pleurophorus – report made of unidentified related form or using admittedly obsolete nomenclature
  - †Pleurophorus delawarensis – type locality for species
  - †Pleurophorus occidentalis
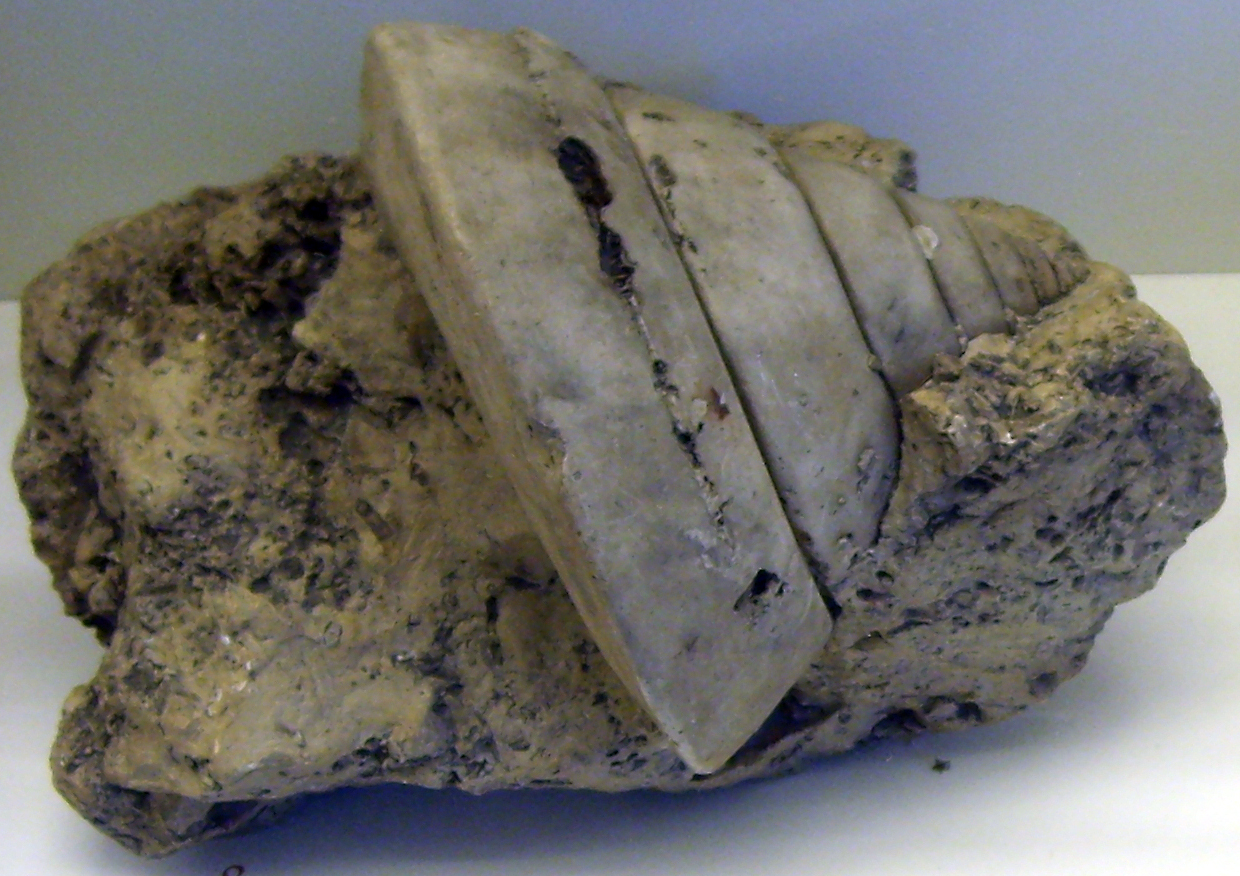
- Fossilized shell of a Pleurotomaria slit snail
  Pleurotomaria – report made of unidentified related form or using admittedly obsolete nomenclature
  - †Pleurotomaria arenaria – type locality for species
  - †Pleurotomaria carinifera – type locality for species
  - †Pleurotomaria discoidea – type locality for species
  - †Pleurotomaria elderi – type locality for species
  - †Pleurotomaria halliana – type locality for species
  - †Pleurotomaria mica – type locality for species
  - †Pleurotomaria neglecta – type locality for species
  - †Pleurotomaria perornata – type locality for species
  - †Pleurotomaria planulata – type locality for species
  - †Pleurotomaria proutiana – type locality for species
  - †Pleurotomaria putilla
  - †Pleurotomaria richardsoni – type locality for species
- †Plicochonetes
  - †Plicochonetes ornatus – or unidentified comparable form
- †Plummeroceras
  - †Plummeroceras plummeri – type locality for species
- †Poacordaites
  - †Poacordaites tenuifolius – or unidentified comparable form
- †Podozamites
- †Poikilosakos
  - †Poikilosakos informis
  - †Poikilosakos petaloides
- †Polidevcia
  - †Polidevcia bellistriata
- †Polyacrodus
  - †Polyacrodus lapalomensis – type locality for species
  - †Polyacrodus ritchiei – type locality for species
  - †Polyacrodus wichitaensis
  - †Polyacrodus zideki – type locality for species
- †Polydiexodina
  - †Polydiexodina shumardi
- †Polylophidium – type locality for genus
  - †Polylophidium discus – type locality for species
- †Polymorpharia
  - †Polymorpharia polymorpha
- †Polypora
  - †Polypora andina
  - †Polypora balkhaschensiformis
  - †Polypora bassleri – or unidentified related form
  - †Polypora crassa – or unidentified comparable form
  - †Polypora darashamensis – or unidentified comparable form
  - †Polypora elliptica – or unidentified related form
  - †Polypora fujimotoi – or unidentified related form
  - †Polypora halliana – or unidentified related form
  - †Polypora hirsuta
  - †Polypora hivatchensis – or unidentified related form
  - †Polypora irregularis – or unidentified comparable form
  - †Polypora keyserlingi – or unidentified related form
  - †Polypora mexicana
  - †Polypora nodocarinata
  - †Polypora soyanensis
  - †Polypora virga – or unidentified comparable form
  - †Polypora vitiosa – or unidentified related form
- †Polyporella
  - †Polyporella perturbata
  - †Polyporella ulakhanensis – or unidentified comparable form
- †Polysiphon – type locality for genus
  - †Polysiphon mirabilis – type locality for species
- †Polysiphonaria – type locality for genus
  - †Polysiphonaria flabellata – type locality for species
  - †Polysiphonaria flabellatum
- †Pontisia
  - †Pontisia costata
  - †Pontisia franklinensis
  - †Pontisia kingi – type locality for species
  - †Pontisia longicosta
  - †Pontisia magnicostata
  - †Pontisia nanas
  - †Pontisia parva
  - †Pontisia robusta
  - †Pontisia stehlii – type locality for species
  - †Pontisia truncata
  - †Pontisia ventricola
  - †Pontisia wolfcampensis
- †Popanoceras
  - †Popanoceras walcotti – type locality for species
- †Posidonia
- †Pragnellia
  - †Pragnellia delicatula – type locality for species
- †Prehoffmannia – type locality for genus
  - †Prehoffmannia milleri – type locality for species
- †Preperonidella
  - †Preperonidella delicata
  - †Preperonidella rigbyi
- †Preshumardites
  - †Preshumardites gaptankensis
  - †Preshumardites illinoisensis
  - †Preshumardites stainbrooki – type locality for species
- Priscopedatus
  - †Priscopedatus bullatus – type locality for species
  - †Priscopedatus buno – type locality for species
  - †Priscopedatus radiatus – type locality for species
  - †Priscopedatus stellatus – type locality for species
- †Procostatoria – type locality for genus
  - †Procostatoria cooperi
  - †Procostatoria gloveri – type locality for species
  - †Procostatoria sexaradiata
  - †Procostatoria sexradiata
- †Prodentalium
  - †Prodentalium canna
  - †Prodentalium raymondi
- †Productina
  - †Productina sampsoni
- †Productus
  - †Productus calhounianus – tentative report
  - †Productus hermosanus
  - †Productus mexicanus – type locality for species
  - †Productus norwoodii – tentative report
  - †Productus semistriatus
- †Progyrolepis
  - †Progyrolepis tricessimalaris – type locality for species
- †Properrinites
  - †Properrinites bakeri
  - †Properrinites boesei – type locality for species
  - †Properrinites type locality for species – informal
- †Propinacoceras
- †Proplina
- †Propopanoceras
  - †Propopanoceras postsimense
- †Prorichthofenia
- †Proshumardites
  - †Proshumardites primus
- †Prostacheoceras
  - †Prostacheoceras skinneri – type locality for species
  - †Prostacheoceras type locality for species – informal
- †Prothalassoceras
  - †Prothalassoceras caddoense – type locality for species
  - †Prothalassoceras kingorum
  - †Prothalassoceras welleri – type locality for species
- †Protocaptorhinus – type locality for genus
  - †Protocaptorhinus pricei – type locality for species
- †Protoretepora
  - †Protoretepora ampla – or unidentified comparable form
- †Protorothyris – type locality for genus
  - †Protorothyris archeri – type locality for species
- †Protowentzelella
  - †Protowentzelella cystosa
  - †Protowentzelella kunthi
- †Protrete – type locality for genus
  - †Protrete texanus – type locality for species
- †Protrochiscolithus
  - †Protrochiscolithus alemanensis – type locality for species
- †Prouddenites
  - †Prouddenites primus – type locality for species
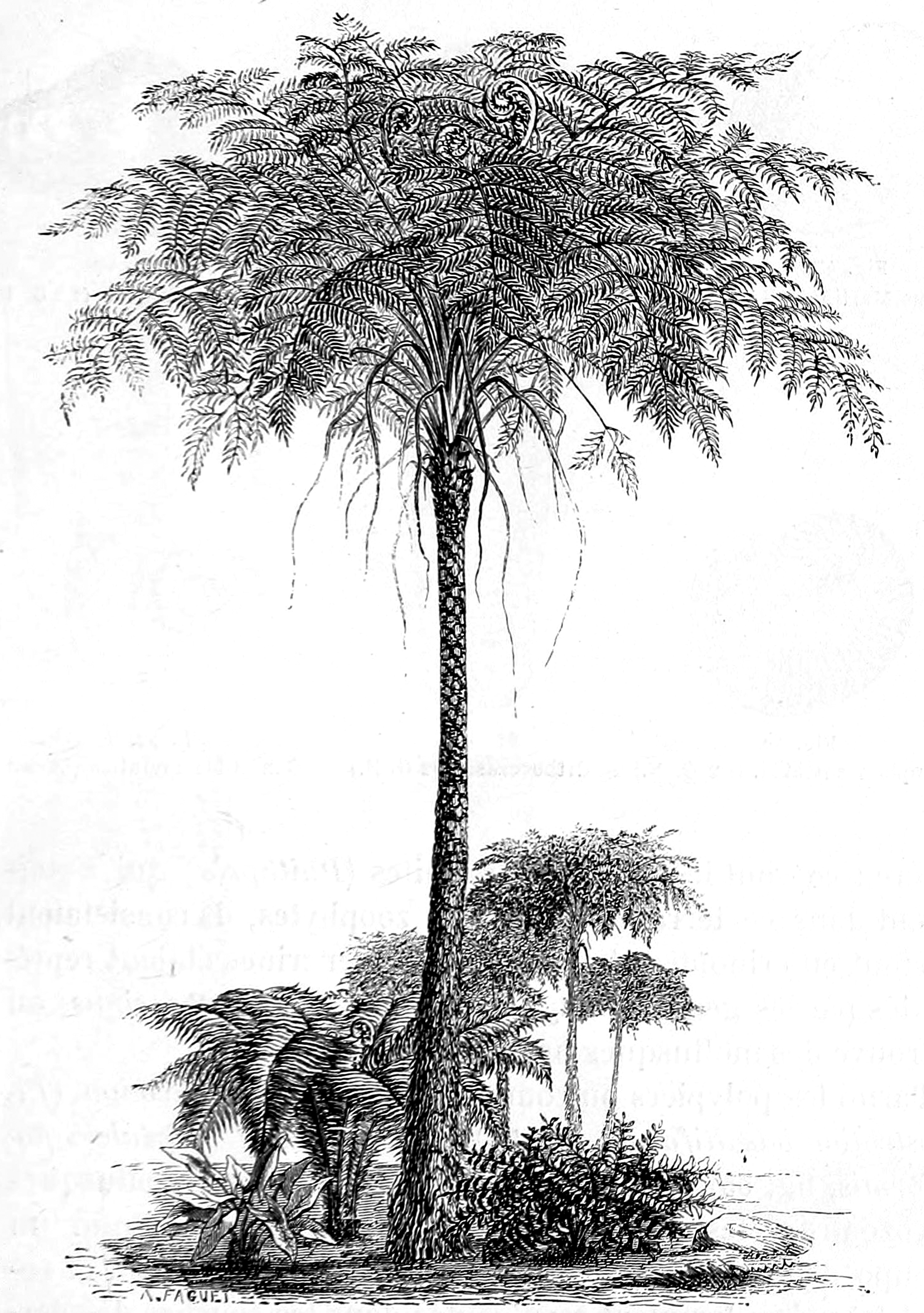
- Life restoration of the Devonian-Permian tree fern Psaronius. Auguste Faguet (1877).
  †Psaronius
- †Pseudagnostus
  - †Pseudagnostus nordicus
- †Pseudoalbaillella
  - †Pseudoalbaillella cona – type locality for species
  - †Pseudoalbaillella fusiformis – or unidentified related form
  - †Pseudoalbaillella globosus
  - †Pseudoalbaillella scalprata
- †Pseudodielasma – type locality for genus
  - †Pseudodielasma brilli
  - †Pseudodielasma gibberum
  - †Pseudodielasma globulum
  - †Pseudodielasma lobatum
  - †Pseudodielasma magnum
  - †Pseudodielasma minor
  - †Pseudodielasma ovatum – type locality for species
  - †Pseudodielasma perplexa – type locality for species
  - †Pseudodielasma pingue
  - †Pseudodielasma pinyonense
  - †Pseudodielasma plicatum
  - †Pseudodielasma scutulatum – type locality for species
  - †Pseudodielasma subcirculare
  - †Pseudodielasma sulcatum
- †Pseudofusulina
  - †Pseudofusulina powwowensis
- †Pseudogastrioceras
  - †Pseudogastrioceras texanum – type locality for species
- †Pseudohystricurus
- †Pseudoleptodus – type locality for genus
  - †Pseudoleptodus annosus
  - †Pseudoleptodus conicus
  - †Pseudoleptodus cucullatus
  - †Pseudoleptodus getawayensis – type locality for species
  - †Pseudoleptodus giganteus
  - †Pseudoleptodus grandis
  - †Pseudoleptodus granulosus
  - †Pseudoleptodus guadalupensis – type locality for species
  - †Pseudoleptodus lepidus
  - †Pseudoleptodus nodosus
  - †Pseudoleptodus primitivus
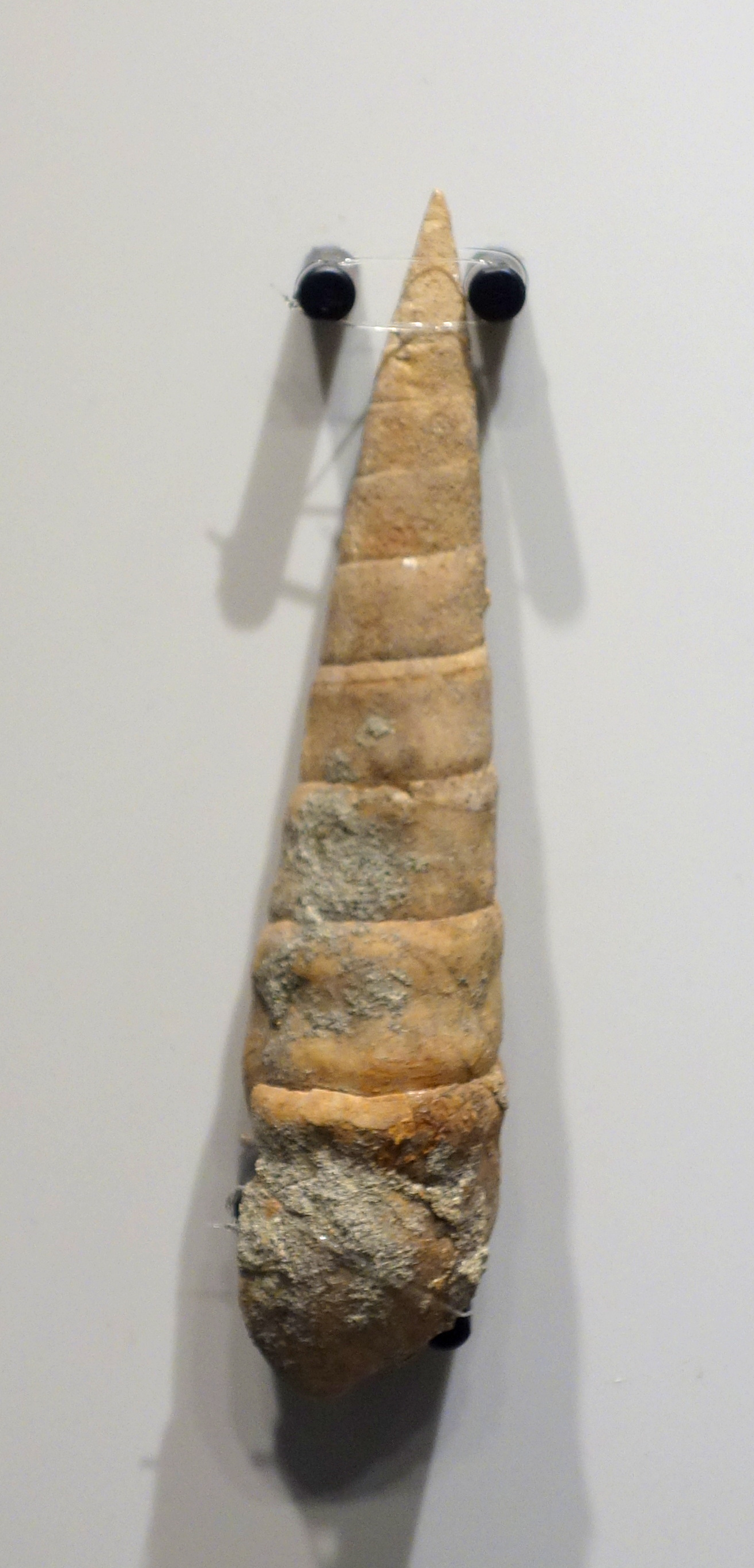
- Fossilized shell of a Pseudomelania sea snail
  †Pseudomelania – report made of unidentified related form or using admittedly obsolete nomenclature
- †Pseudomonotis
  - †Pseudomonotis acinetus
  - †Pseudomonotis hawni
  - †Pseudomonotis likharevi
  - †Pseudomonotis speluncaria – tentative report
  - †Pseudomonotis sublaevis
- †Pseudooneotodus
  - †Pseudooneotodus beckmanni
  - †Pseudooneotodus bicornis
  - †Pseudooneotodus linguicornis
- †Pseudoparalegoceras
  - †Pseudoparalegoceras bellilineatum
  - †Pseudoparalegoceras brazoense – type locality for species
- †Pseudopronorites
  - †Pseudopronorites arkansiensis
  - †Pseudopronorites llanoensis – type locality for species
- †Pseudorthoceras
  - †Pseudorthoceras knoxense
- †Pseudoschwagerina
  - †Pseudoschwagerina beedei
  - †Pseudoschwagerina geiseri
  - †Pseudoschwagerina gerontica
  - †Pseudoschwagerina uddeni
- †Pseudovidrioceras
  - †Pseudovidrioceras dunbari
- †Pseudovirgula – type locality for genus
  - †Pseudovirgula tenuis – type locality for species
- †Pseudovoltzia
  - †Pseudovoltzia liebeana
- †Pseudowannerophyllum
  - †Pseudowannerophyllum solidum – type locality for species
- †Pseudozaphrentoides
  - †Pseudozaphrentoides ordinatus – type locality for species
- †Pseudozygopleura
  - †Pseudozygopleura belli – type locality for species
  - †Pseudozygopleura moorei
  - †Pseudozygopleura multicostata
  - †Pseudozygopleura obtusicacuminis
  - †Pseudozygopleura scitula
  - †Pseudozygopleura type locality for species – informal
- †Psilocamara – type locality for genus
  - †Psilocamara hesperia
  - †Psilocamara renfroarum – type locality for species
- Pteria – report made of unidentified related form or using admittedly obsolete nomenclature
  - †Pteria richardsoni
  - †Pteria squamifera – type locality for species
- †Pterinopectinella
  - †Pterinopectinella spinifera
- †Pterocephalia
- †Pterochiton
  - †Pterochiton newelli – type locality for species
  - †Pterochiton spatulatus
  - †Pterochiton texanus – type locality for species
- †Pteronites
- †Ptilotorhynchus
  - †Ptilotorhynchus delicatum
- †Ptychocarpus
- †Ptygmactrum – type locality for genus
  - †Ptygmactrum acutum
  - †Ptygmactrum angulatum
  - †Ptygmactrum depressum
  - †Ptygmactrum extensum – type locality for species
  - †Ptygmactrum mordicum
  - †Ptygmactrum spiculatum – type locality for species
- †Pudoproetus
  - †Pudoproetus chappelensis
- †Pugnax
  - †Pugnax osagensis
- †Pugnoides
  - †Pugnoides bidentatus
  - †Pugnoides elegans
  - †Pugnoides shumardianus
  - †Pugnoides swallovianus
  - †Pugnoides texanus
- †Pulchratia
  - †Pulchratia symmetricus
- †Pulchrilamina
  - †Pulchrilamina spinosa
- †Pulsatospongia – type locality for genus
  - †Pulsatospongia obconica – type locality for species
- †Punctospirifer
  - †Punctospirifer billingsii
  - †Punctospirifer kentuckensis
- †Pustula
  - †Pustula semipunctata

== Q ==
- †Quadratia
  - †Quadratia egregia – type locality for species
- †Quadrochonetes
  - †Quadrochonetes girtyi – type locality for species
  - †Quadrochonetes praecursor
- †Quasicaecilia – type locality for genus
  - †Quasicaecilia texana – type locality for species

== R ==
- †Radiotrabeculopora
  - †Radiotrabeculopora virga – type locality for species
- †Rallacosta
  - †Rallacosta actina
  - †Rallacosta imporcata
  - †Rallacosta laminata
  - †Rallacosta xystica
- †Ramavectus
  - †Ramavectus diabloensis
- †Ramipora
  - †Ramipora hochstetteri – or unidentified related form
- †Ramosothalamiella – type locality for genus
  - †Ramosothalamiella divaricata – type locality for species
- †Rananasus
- †Raphistomina
- †Rasettia
  - †Rasettia capax – or unidentified comparable form
- †Rauserella
  - †Rauserella erratica
- †Rayonnoceras
  - †Rayonnoceras huecoense – type locality for species
- †Rectograptus
  - †Rectograptus amplexicaulis
- †Regrantia
  - †Regrantia linoproductiformis
- †Reiszorhinus – type locality for genus
  - †Reiszorhinus olsoni – type locality for species
- †Renalcis
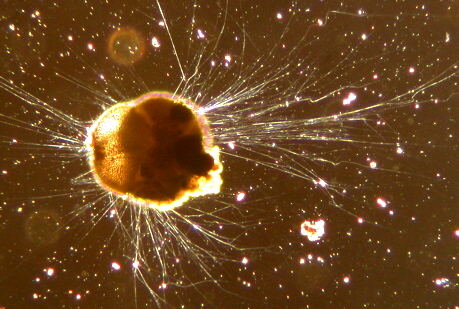
- Retaria
  †Retaria – report made of unidentified related form or using admittedly obsolete nomenclature
  - †Retaria leplayi – tentative report
- †Reteporidra
  - †Reteporidra orientalis – or unidentified comparable form
- †Retichonetes – tentative report
  - †Retichonetes gibberulus – type locality for species
- †Reticularia
  - †Reticularia cooperensis
- †Reticulariina
  - †Reticulariina bufala
  - †Reticulariina cerina – type locality for species
  - †Reticulariina craticula
  - †Reticulariina echinata
  - †Reticulariina girtyi
  - †Reticulariina hueconiana – type locality for species
  - †Reticulariina impressa
  - †Reticulariina laxa
  - †Reticulariina newelli
  - †Reticulariina phoxa
  - †Reticulariina powwowensis
  - †Reticulariina pristina – type locality for species
  - †Reticulariina pusilla
  - †Reticulariina roscida
  - †Reticulariina senticosa
  - †Reticulariina strigosa
  - †Reticulariina subulata
  - †Reticulariina tetrica
  - †Reticulariina venustula
  - †Reticulariina welleri
- †Reticulatia
  - †Reticulatia americana
  - †Reticulatia huecoensis – type locality for species
  - †Reticulatia robusta
- †Retispira
  - †Retispira bellireticulata
  - †Retispira fragilis – type locality for species
  - †Retispira kansasensis
  - †Retispira lyelli – type locality for species
  - †Retispira meekiana
  - †Retispira modesta
  - †Retispira texana – type locality for species
- †Rhabdiferoceras
- †Rhabdomeson
  - †Rhabdomeson bellum
- †Rhabdotocochlis
  - †Rhabdotocochlis type locality for species – informal
- †Rhamnaria – type locality for genus
  - †Rhamnaria eximia
  - †Rhamnaria grandis
  - †Rhamnaria kingorum – type locality for species
  - †Rhamnaria rectangulata
  - †Rhamnaria shumardi
  - †Rhamnaria sulcata
  - †Rhamnaria tenuispinosa – type locality for species
  - †Rhamnaria vinnula
- †Rhipidomella
  - †Rhipidomella carbonaria
  - †Rhipidomella hessensis – type locality for species
  - †Rhipidomella hispidula – type locality for species
  - †Rhipidomella miscella
  - †Rhipidomella perminuta
- †Rhombopora
  - †Rhombopora lepidodendroides
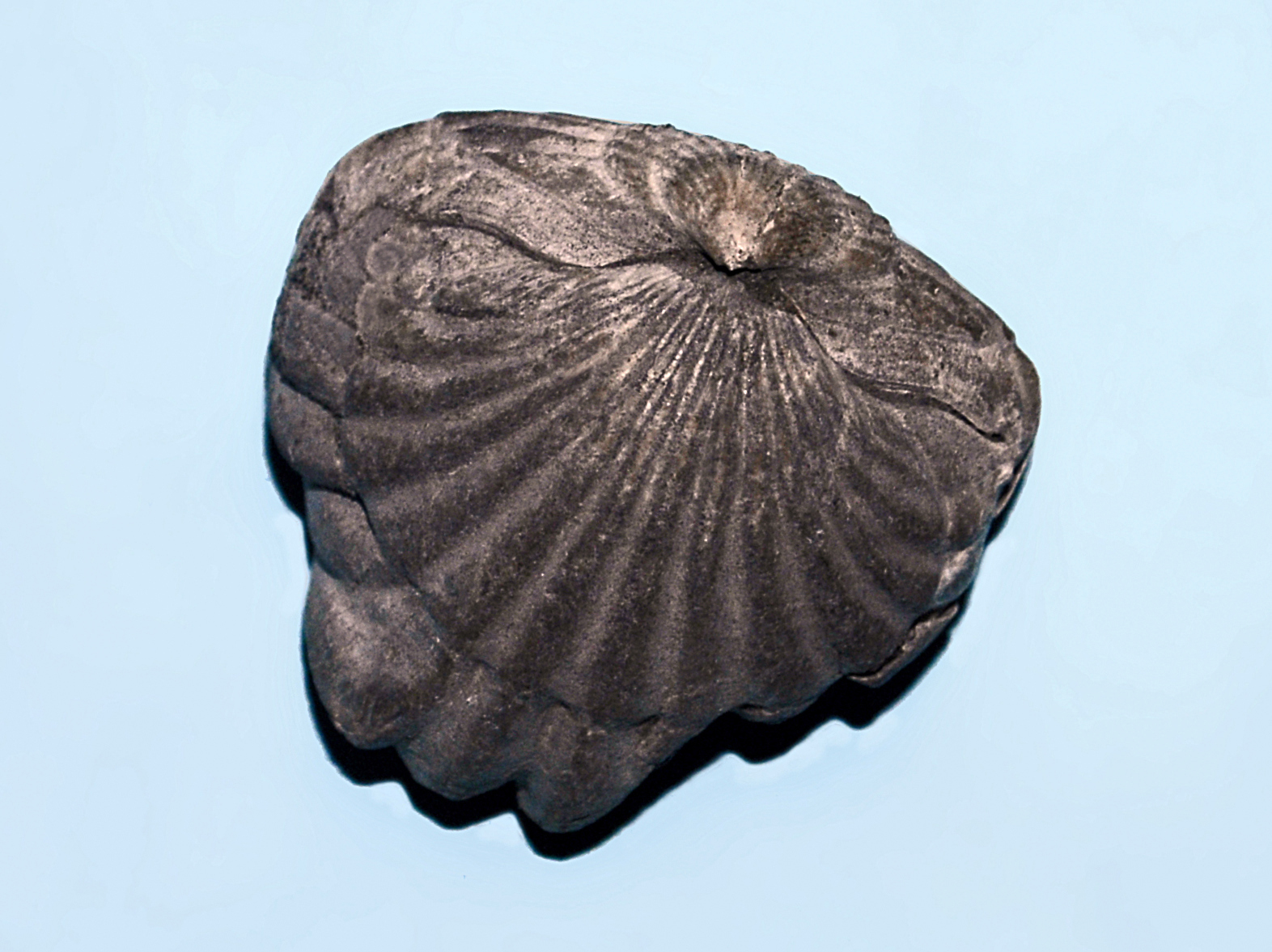
- Fossilized shell of the Silurian-Eocene articulate brachiopod Rhynchonella
  †Rhynchonella – report made of unidentified related form or using admittedly obsolete nomenclature
  - †Rhynchonella guadalupae – type locality for species
  - †Rhynchonella texana
- †Rhynchopora
  - †Rhynchopora dossena
  - †Rhynchopora guadalupensis
  - †Rhynchopora hebetata
  - †Rhynchopora illinoisensis
  - †Rhynchopora molina – type locality for species
  - †Rhynchopora palumbula – type locality for species
  - †Rhynchopora patula
  - †Rhynchopora sansabensis – type locality for species
  - †Rhynchopora sphenoides
  - †Rhynchopora taylori
  - †Rhynchopora tenera
- †Rhynchotrema
  - †Rhynchotrema iowense
- †Rhytiophora
  - †Rhytiophora blairi – or unidentified comparable form
  - †Rhytiophora calhounensis
- †Rhytisia
  - †Rhytisia rugosa
- †Ribeiria
  - †Ribeiria calcifera
- †Richardsonites
  - †Richardsonites richardsonianus
- †Rigbyella
  - †Rigbyella girtyi – type locality for species
- †Rigrantia
  - †Rigrantia costella
  - †Rigrantia hessensis – type locality for species
  - †Rigrantia planumbona
  - †Rigrantia regularis
- †Rioceras
  - †Rioceras dartoni – type locality for species
  - †Rioceras tubulare – type locality for species
  - †Rioceras wellsi – type locality for species
- †Roadoceras
  - †Roadoceras beedei – type locality for species
  - †Roadoceras roadense – type locality for species
- †Roemerella
  - †Roemerella gigantissima – type locality for species
- †Romeria – type locality for genus
  - †Romeria prima – type locality for species
  - †Romeria texana – type locality for species
- †Rota
  - †Rota martini
- †Rotaia
- †Rothianiscus – type locality for genus
  - †Rothianiscus multidonta – type locality for species
- †Roundyella
  - †Roundyella dorsopapillosa – type locality for species
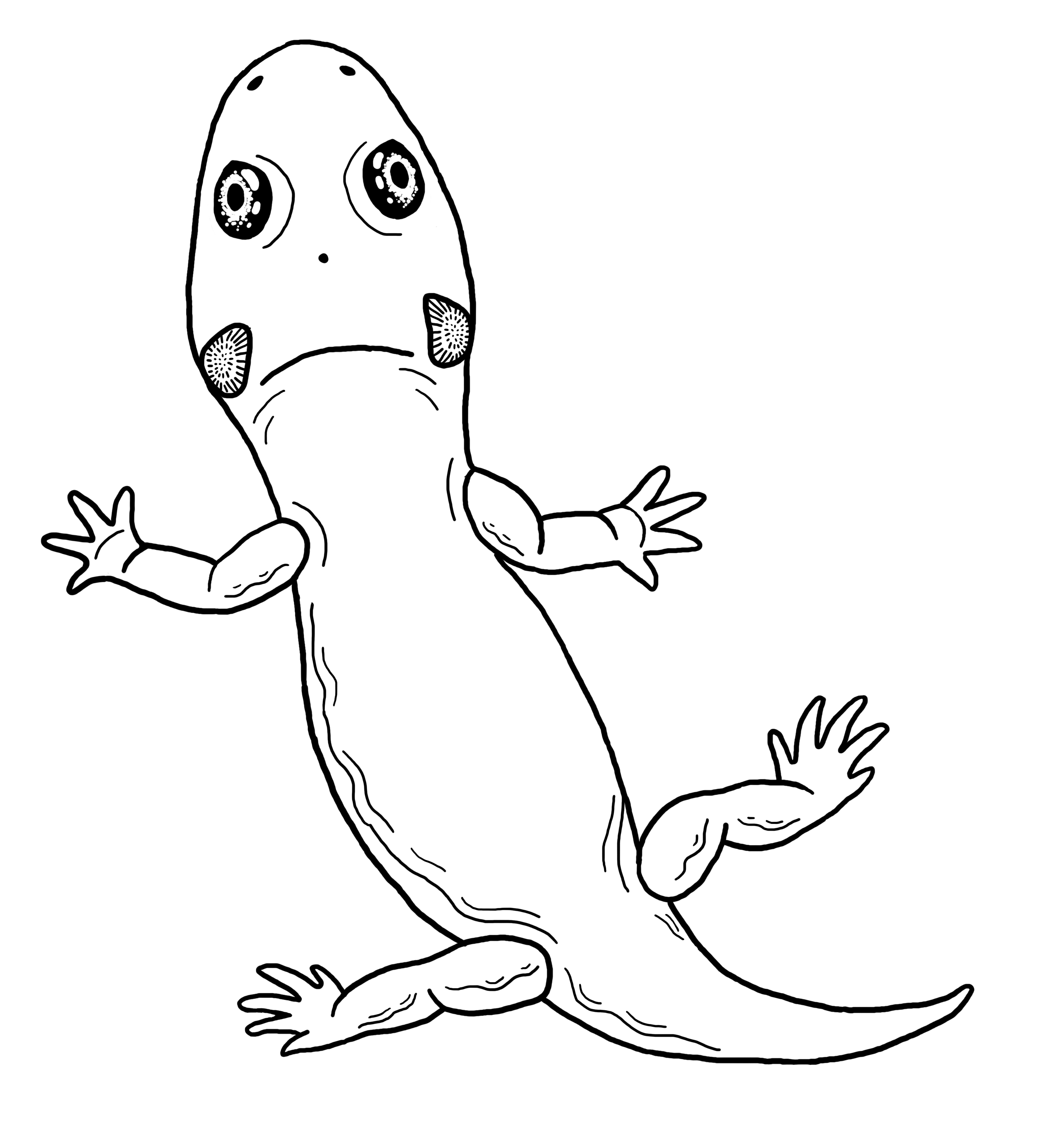
- Life restoration of the Permian amphibian Rubeostratilia
  †Rubeostratilia – type locality for genus
  - †Rubeostratilia texensis – type locality for species
- †Rugaria
  - †Rugaria crassa
  - †Rugaria hessensis – type locality for species
  - †Rugaria molengraaffi – tentative report
- †Rugatia
  - †Rugatia convexa
  - †Rugatia incurva
  - †Rugatia incurvata – type locality for species
  - †Rugatia mckeei
  - †Rugatia occidentalis
  - †Rugatia paraindica
- †Rugosochonetes
  - †Rugosochonetes burlingtonensis
- †Russellites
  - †Russellites taeniata
- †Ruthenoceras – report made of unidentified related form or using admittedly obsolete nomenclature

== S ==
- †Saffordophyllum
  - †Saffordophyllum newcombae – type locality for species
- †Sagenodus
- †Sagittoceras – tentative report
  - †Sagittoceras hathawayanum – or unidentified comparable form
- †Sallya
  - †Sallya bicincta
  - †Sallya linsa – type locality for species
  - †Sallya striata – type locality for species
- †Salvadorea
  - †Salvadorea kingae
- †Samaropsis
- †Sandolasma – tentative report
  - †Sandolasma cooperi – type locality for species
- †Sandrewia – type locality for genus
  - †Sandrewia texana – type locality for species
- †Sanniolus – type locality for genus
  - †Sanniolus sigmoides – type locality for species
- †Saportaea – tentative report
- †Sarganostega
  - †Sarganostega murata
  - †Sarganostega pressa
  - †Sarganostega prisca
  - †Sarganostega pyramidalis – type locality for species
  - †Sarganostega transversalis
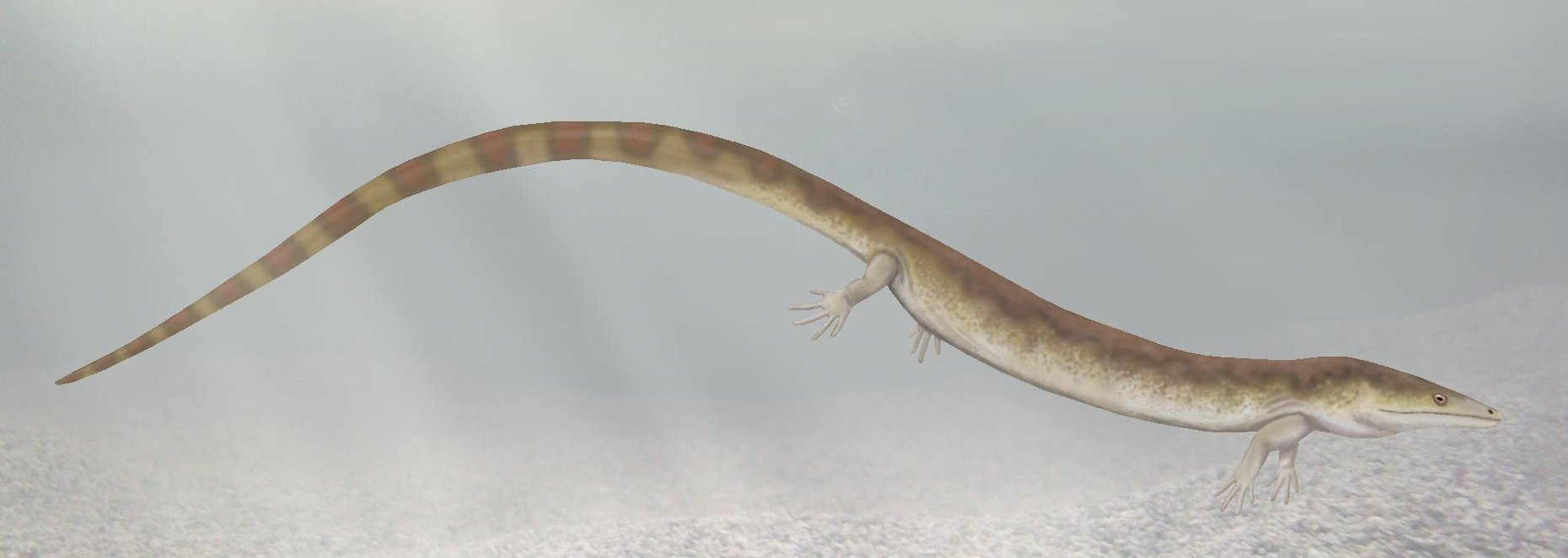
- Restoration of the Carboniferous amphibian Sauropleura
  †Sauropleura
  - †Sauropleura bairdi – type locality for species
- †Scacchinella
  - †Scacchinella americana
  - †Scacchinella exasperata – type locality for species
  - †Scacchinella gigantea
  - †Scacchinella primitiva
  - †Scacchinella titan – type locality for species
  - †Scacchinella triangulata – type locality for species
- †Scaldia
- †Scapanops – type locality for genus
  - †Scapanops neglecta – type locality for species
- †Scapharina
  - †Scapharina levis
  - †Scapharina quadrata
  - †Scapharina rugosa
- †Sceletonia
  - †Sceletonia crassa
- †Scenesia
  - †Scenesia extensa
- †Schaefferichthys – type locality for genus
  - †Schaefferichthys leudersensis – type locality for species
- †Scheiella – type locality for genus
  - †Scheiella thesaurium – type locality for species
- †Scheiia
  - †Scheiia tuberosa
- †Schematochiton
  - †Schematochiton arthurcooperi
- †Schistoceras
  - †Schistoceras missouriense – type locality for species
- †Schizodus
  - †Schizodus canalis
  - †Schizodus ovatus
  - †Schizodus securus – type locality for species
  - †Schizodus supaiensis
  - †Schizodus texanus – type locality for species
  - †Schizodus ulrichi – or unidentified comparable form
  - †Schizodus wyomingensis
- †Schizograptus
- †Schizopea
- †Schizophoria
- †Schubertella
  - †Schubertella kingi
- †Schuchertella – tentative report
  - †Schuchertella subvexa
- †Schwagerina
  - †Schwagerina bellula
  - †Schwagerina crassitectoria
  - †Schwagerina davisi
  - †Schwagerina diversiformis
  - †Schwagerina emaciata
  - †Schwagerina eolata
  - †Schwagerina franklinensis
  - †Schwagerina grandensis – or unidentified related form
  - †Schwagerina huecoensis
  - †Schwagerina knighti
  - †Schwagerina menziesi – type locality for species
  - †Schwagerina nelsoni
  - †Schwagerina neolata
  - †Schwagerina thompsoni – tentative report
- †Schyroconcha
  - †Schyroconcha spinosa – or unidentified related form
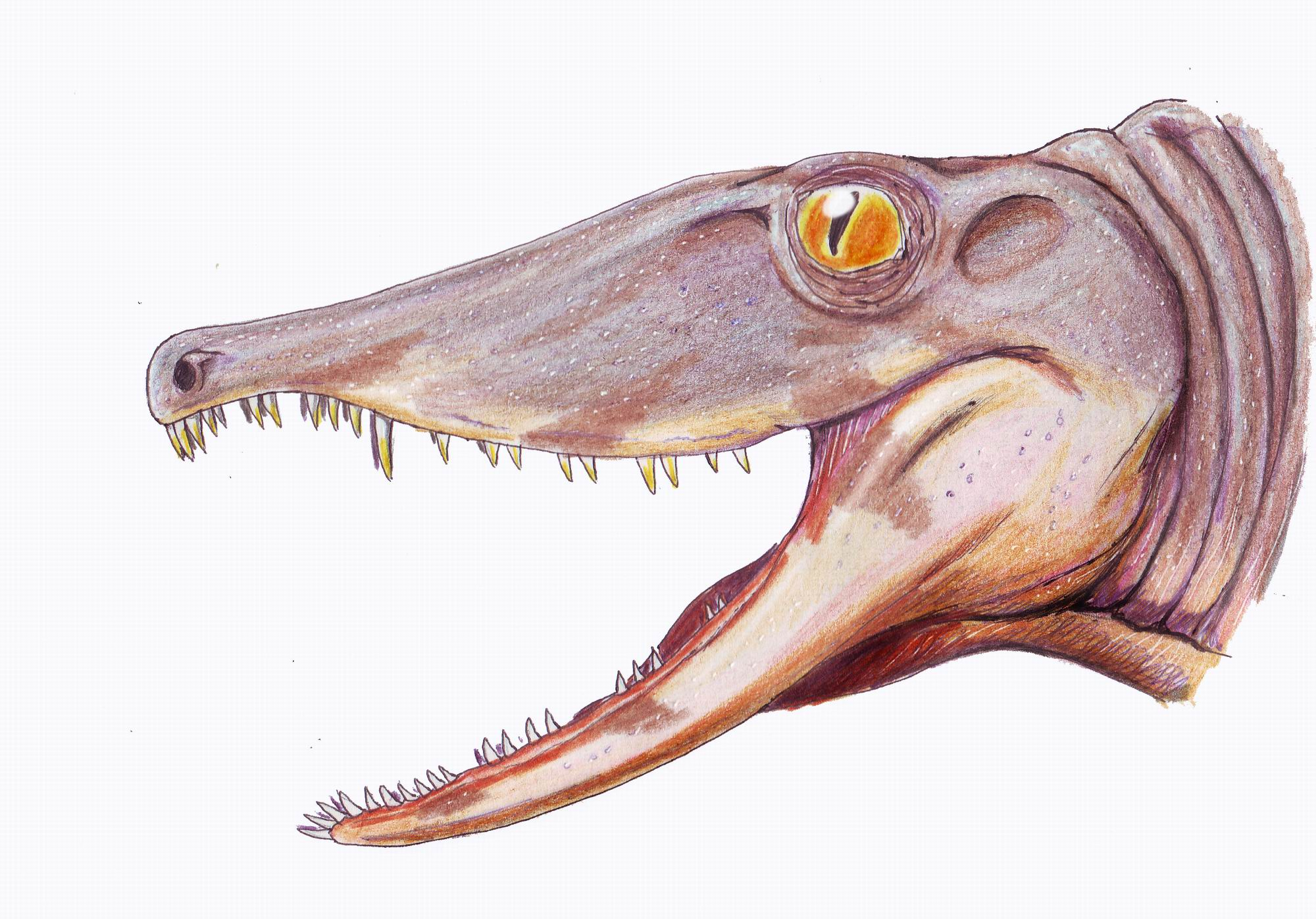
- Restorative portrait of the Permian synapsid (mammal precursor) Secodontosaurus
  †Secodontosaurus
  - †Secodontosaurus obtusidens – type locality for species
  - †Secodontosaurus willistoni – type locality for species
- †Sedenticellula
  - †Sedenticellula sacra
- †Sedgwickia
  - †Sedgwickia topekaensis
- †Sellardsicrinus – tentative report
- †Semipetasus – type locality for genus
  - †Semipetasus signatus – type locality for species
- †Septimyalina
  - †Septimyalina burmai
  - †Septimyalina perattenuata
- †Septopora
  - †Septopora biserialis – or unidentified comparable form
  - †Septopora blanda – or unidentified comparable form
  - †Septopora cestriensis – or unidentified comparable form
  - †Septopora flabellata – or unidentified comparable form
  - †Septopora lineata – or unidentified related form
  - †Septopora orientalis
  - †Septopora pinnata – or unidentified related form
  - †Septopora quasiorientalis – or unidentified comparable form
  - †Septopora robusta – or unidentified related form
  - †Septopora spinulosa – or unidentified related form
- Serpula – tentative report
- †Sestropoma
  - †Sestropoma cribriferum
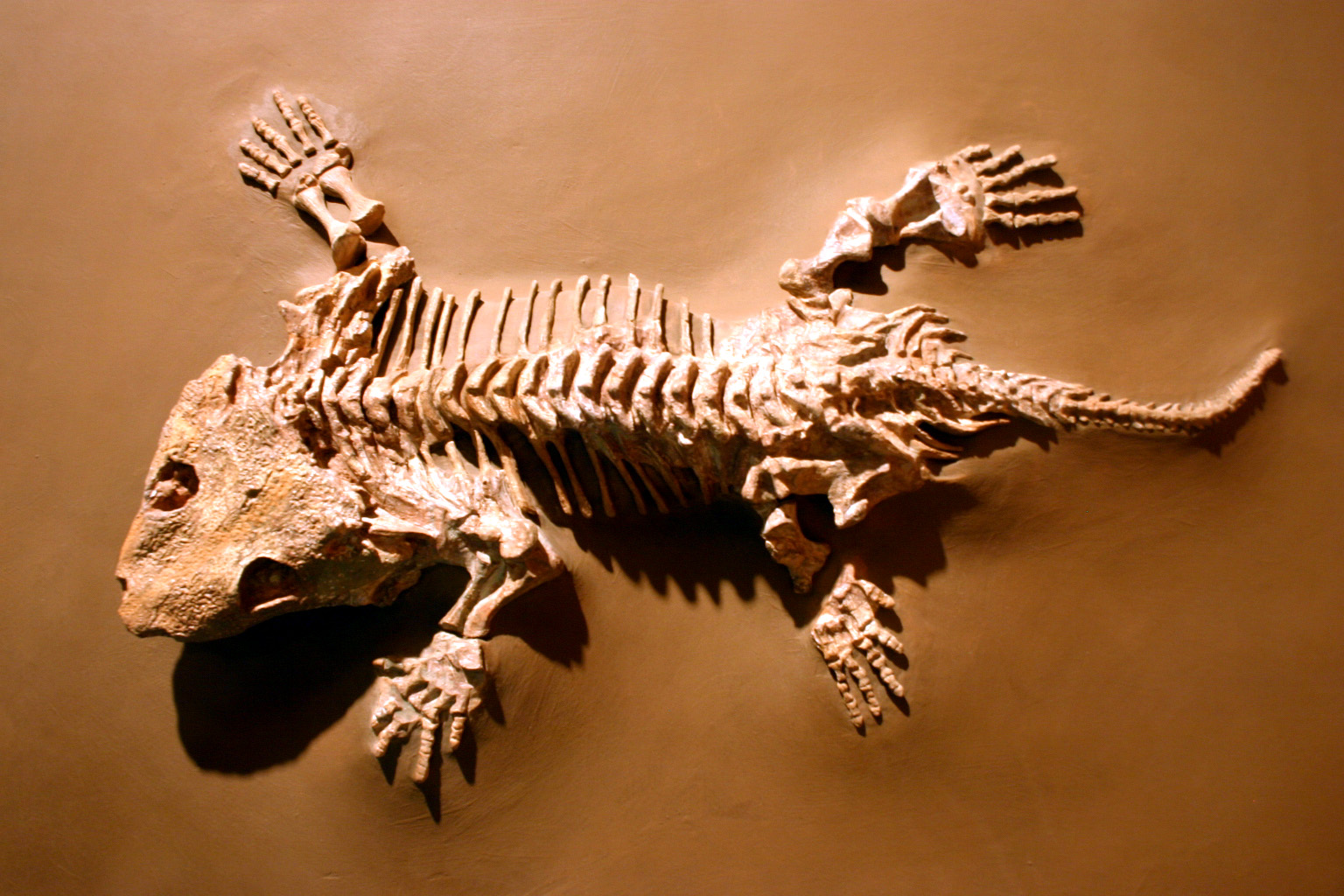
- Fossilized skeleton of the Permian primitive four-limbed animal Seymouria
  †Seymouria – type locality for genus
  - †Seymouria baylorensis – type locality for species
- †Shamovella
- †Shansiella
  - †Shansiella beckwithana
  - †Shansiella carbonaria
- †Shouchangoceras
  - †Shouchangoceras americanum – type locality for species
- †Shumardella
  - †Shumardella obsolescens
- †Shumardites
  - †Shumardites cuyleri – type locality for species
  - †Shumardites simondsi
- †Shwedagonia
  - †Shwedagonia elegans – type locality for species
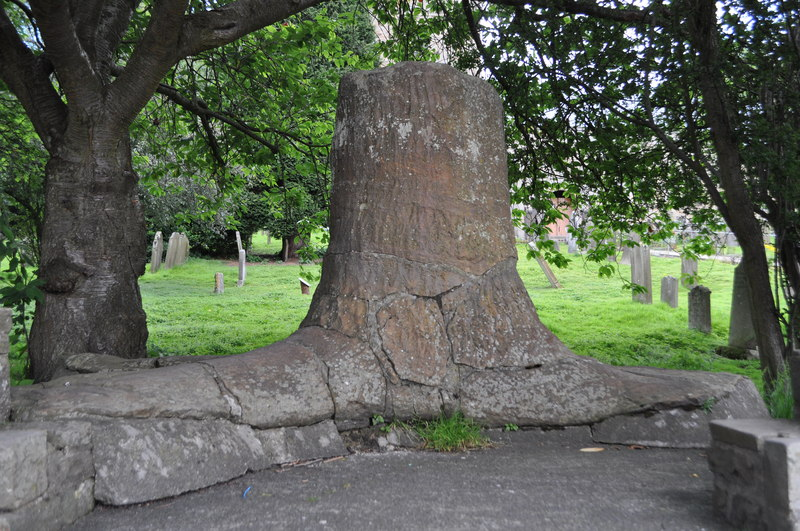
- Fossilized stump of the Carboniferous-Permian club moss relative Sigillaria
  †Sigillaria
  - †Sigillaria brardii
- †Sigillariostrobus
  - †Sigillariostrobus hastatus
- †Simplicarina
  - †Simplicarina incompta
- †Sinuella – type locality for genus
  - †Sinuella minuta – type locality for species
- †Sinuopea
  - †Sinuopea humerosa
  - †Sinuopea vera
- †Siphonosia
  - †Siphonosia alleni
- †Skinnerella
  - †Skinnerella biconica – type locality for species
  - †Skinnerella brevis – type locality for species
  - †Skinnerella cylindrica – type locality for species
  - †Skinnerella diabloensis
  - †Skinnerella formosa – type locality for species
  - †Skinnerella magna – type locality for species
  - †Skinnerella robusta – type locality for species
  - †Skinnerella schucherti
  - †Skinnerella speciosa – type locality for species
  - †Skinnerella tenuis – type locality for species
- †Skinnerina
  - †Skinnerina fusiformis – type locality for species
  - †Skinnerina mildredae – type locality for species
  - †Skinnerina rotundata – type locality for species
- †Slaugenhopia – type locality for genus
  - †Slaugenhopia texensis – type locality for species
- †Soleachiton – type locality for genus
  - †Soleachiton yochelsoni – type locality for species
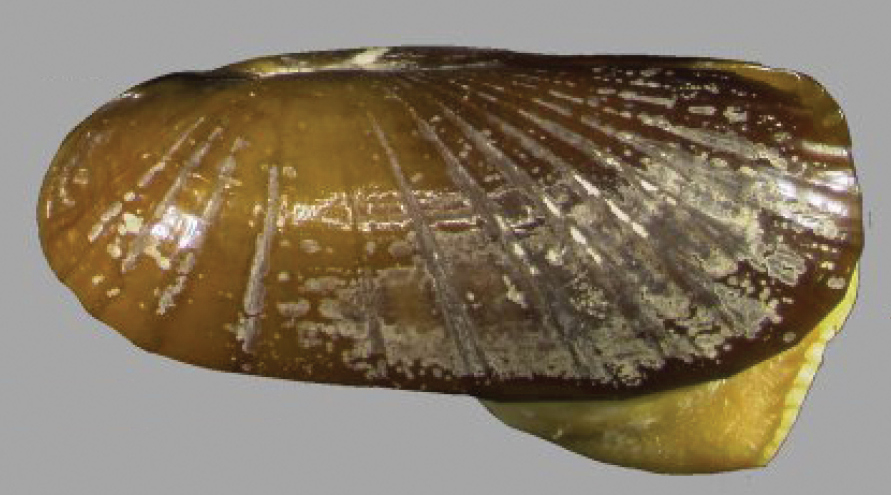
- Modern specimen of the marine bivalve Solemya
  Solemya – tentative report
- †Soleniscus
  - †Soleniscus diminutus – type locality for species
  - †Soleniscus girtyi – type locality for species
  - †Soleniscus primigenius
  - †Soleniscus primogenius
  - †Soleniscus regularis
  - †Soleniscus texanus – type locality for species
  - †Soleniscus typicus
  - †Soleniscus variabilis
- †Solenochilus
  - †Solenochilus kempae – type locality for species
- †Solenopora
  - †Solenopora texana
- †Sollasia
  - †Sollasia ostiolata
- †Sollasiella – type locality for genus
  - †Sollasiella reticulata – type locality for species
- †Sowburia
  - †Sowburia texana – type locality for species
- †Spermatodus
  - †Spermatodus pustulosus
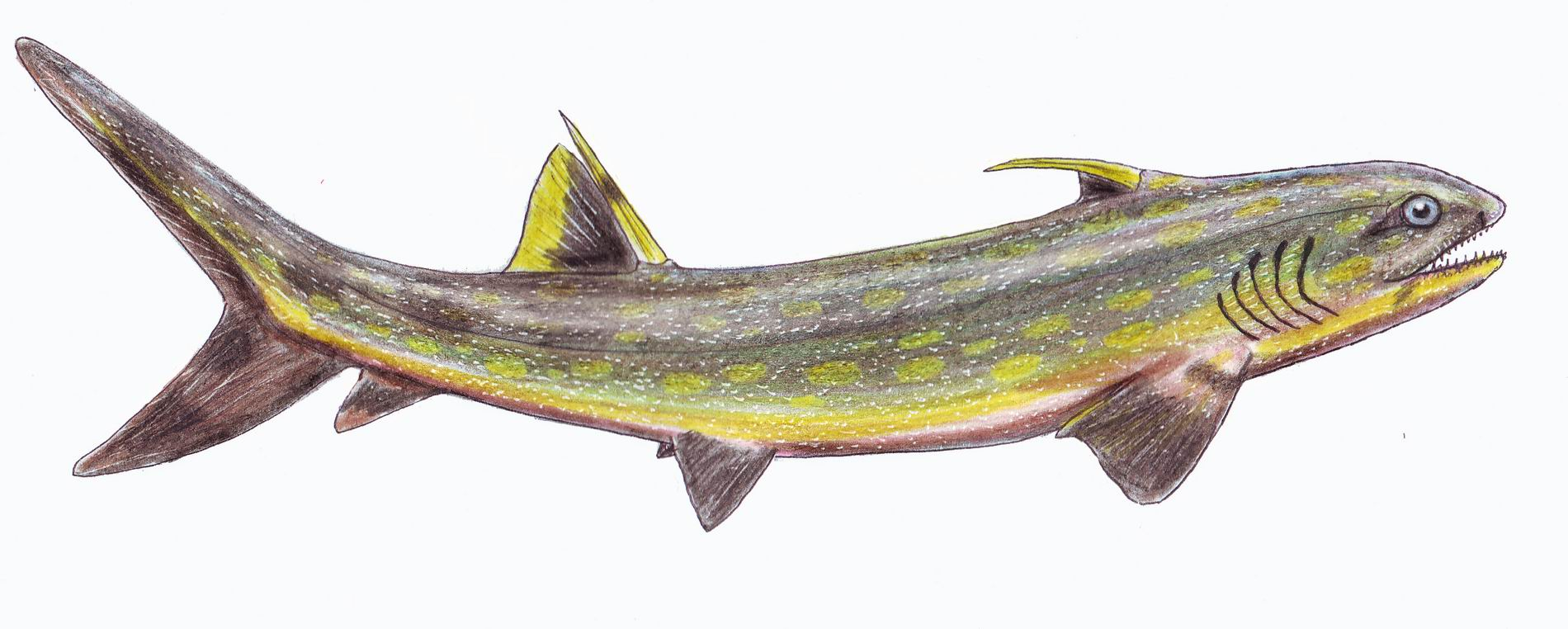
- Life restoration of the Late Devonian-Permian Sphenacanthus
  †Sphenacanthus
- †Sphenophyllum
  - †Sphenophyllum oblongifolium
  - †Sphenophyllum obovatum
- †Sphenopteris
  - †Sphenopteris macilenta – or unidentified comparable form
- †Spica
  - †Spica texana – type locality for species
- †Spinarella
  - †Spinarella costellata
  - †Spinarella lobata
  - †Spinarella paulula
  - †Spinarella perfecta
- †Spinifrons
  - †Spinifrons delicatula
  - †Spinifrons magna
  - †Spinifrons quadrata
- †Spinofenestella
  - †Spinofenestella spinulosa – or unidentified related form
- †Spinomarginifera – or unidentified comparable form
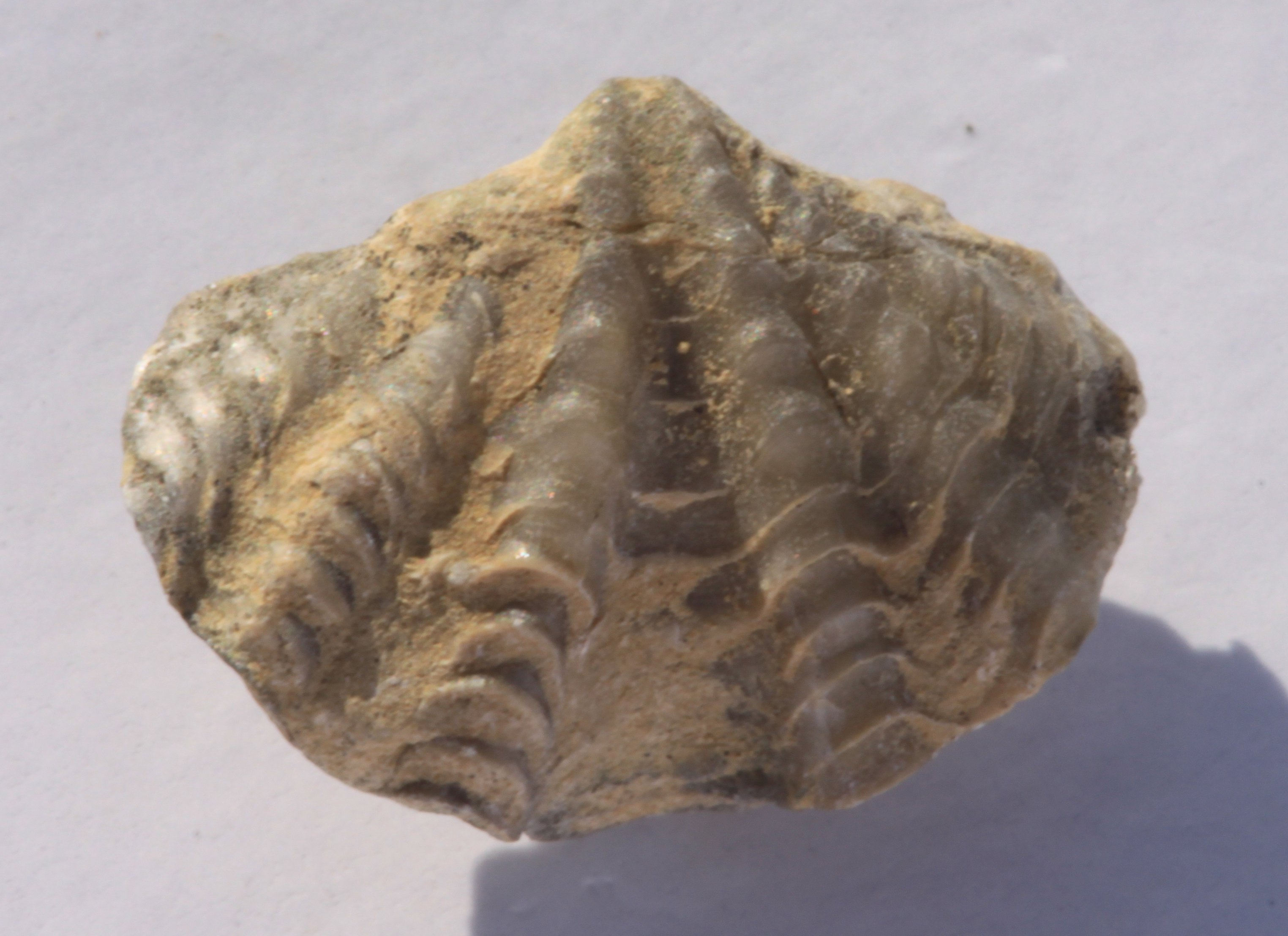
- Fossilized shell of the Late Ordovician-Late Triassic brachiopod Spirifer
  †Spirifer
  - †Spirifer chappelensis – type locality for species
  - †Spirifer gregeri – or unidentified comparable form
  - †Spirifer guadalupensis – type locality for species
  - †Spirifer rockymontanus
- †Spiriferella
  - †Spiriferella calcarata
  - †Spiriferella clypeata
  - †Spiriferella embrithes
  - †Spiriferella gloverae
  - †Spiriferella gravis – type locality for species
  - †Spiriferella levis – type locality for species
  - †Spiriferella propria
  - †Spiriferella sulcifer – type locality for species
- †Spiriferellina
  - †Spiriferellina hilli – type locality for species
  - †Spiriferellina nasuta
  - †Spiriferellina nuda
  - †Spiriferellina paucicostata – type locality for species
  - †Spiriferellina tricosa – type locality for species
  - †Spiriferellina vescula
- †Spiriferinaella
  - †Spiriferinaella limata
  - †Spiriferinaella medialis
  - †Spiriferinaella scalpata – type locality for species
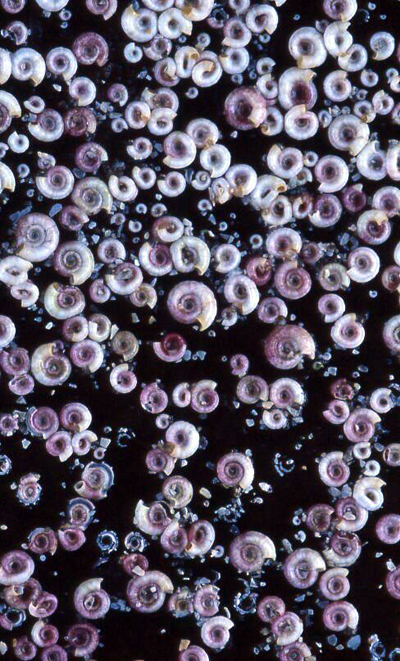
- Modern shells of the polychaete worm Spirorbis
  Spirorbis
  - †Spirorbis carbonarius – or unidentified comparable form
- †Spiroscala – type locality for genus
  - †Spiroscala pagoda – type locality for species
  - †Spiroscala pulchra – type locality for species
- †Spuriosa
  - †Spuriosa circularis
- †Spyridiophora
  - †Spyridiophora compacta
  - †Spyridiophora distincta – type locality for species
  - †Spyridiophora reticulata – type locality for species
- †Stacheoceras
  - †Stacheoceras gilliamense – type locality for species
- †Staffella
  - †Staffella lacunosa
- †Stearoceras
  - †Stearoceras conchiferum
  - †Stearoceras gibbosum – or unidentified related form
  - †Stearoceras militarium – type locality for species
  - †Stearoceras simplex – type locality for species
- †Stegochiton – type locality for genus
  - †Stegochiton coxi – type locality for species
  - †Stegochiton onerosus – type locality for species
- †Stegocoelia
  - †Stegocoelia copei
  - †Stegocoelia crenulata
  - †Stegocoelia dozierensis – type locality for species
  - †Stegocoelia missouriensis
- †Stellarocrinus
  - †Stellarocrinus texani – type locality for species
- †Stenocoelia
- †Stenodiscus – tentative report
- †Stenoglaphyrites
  - †Stenoglaphyrites incisus
- †Stenolobulites
  - †Stenolobulites admiralensis – type locality for species
  - †Stenolobulites depressus – type locality for species
  - †Stenolobulites stenolobulus – type locality for species
  - †Stenolobulites subglobosus – type locality for species
  - †Stenolobulites type locality for species – informal
- †Stenopoceras
  - †Stenopoceras inexpectans – type locality for species
  - †Stenopoceras whitei – type locality for species
- †Stenopora
  - †Stenopora granulosa – type locality for species
  - †Stenopora richardsoni
- †Stenopronorites
- †Stenoscisma
  - †Stenoscisma abbreviatum
  - †Stenoscisma aberrans
  - †Stenoscisma amoenum
  - †Stenoscisma aptatum
  - †Stenoscisma bellatulum
  - †Stenoscisma bonum
  - †Stenoscisma calvatum
  - †Stenoscisma camurum
  - †Stenoscisma doricranum
  - †Stenoscisma exutum
  - †Stenoscisma fabarium
  - †Stenoscisma hadrum – type locality for species
  - †Stenoscisma hueconianum – type locality for species
  - †Stenoscisma inaequale – type locality for species
  - †Stenoscisma indentata
  - †Stenoscisma kalum
  - †Stenoscisma levicostum
  - †Stenoscisma maniculum
  - †Stenoscisma multicostum
  - †Stenoscisma myioides
  - †Stenoscisma oblisum
  - †Stenoscisma pansum
  - †Stenoscisma peneleve
  - †Stenoscisma problematicum
  - †Stenoscisma pyraustoides – type locality for species
  - †Stenoscisma renode – type locality for species
  - †Stenoscisma repigratum
  - †Stenoscisma schlotheimi – tentative report
  - †Stenoscisma thevenini
  - †Stenoscisma trabeatum
  - †Stenoscisma triquetrum
  - †Stenoscisma venustum
- †Stephanozyga
  - †Stephanozyga subnodosa
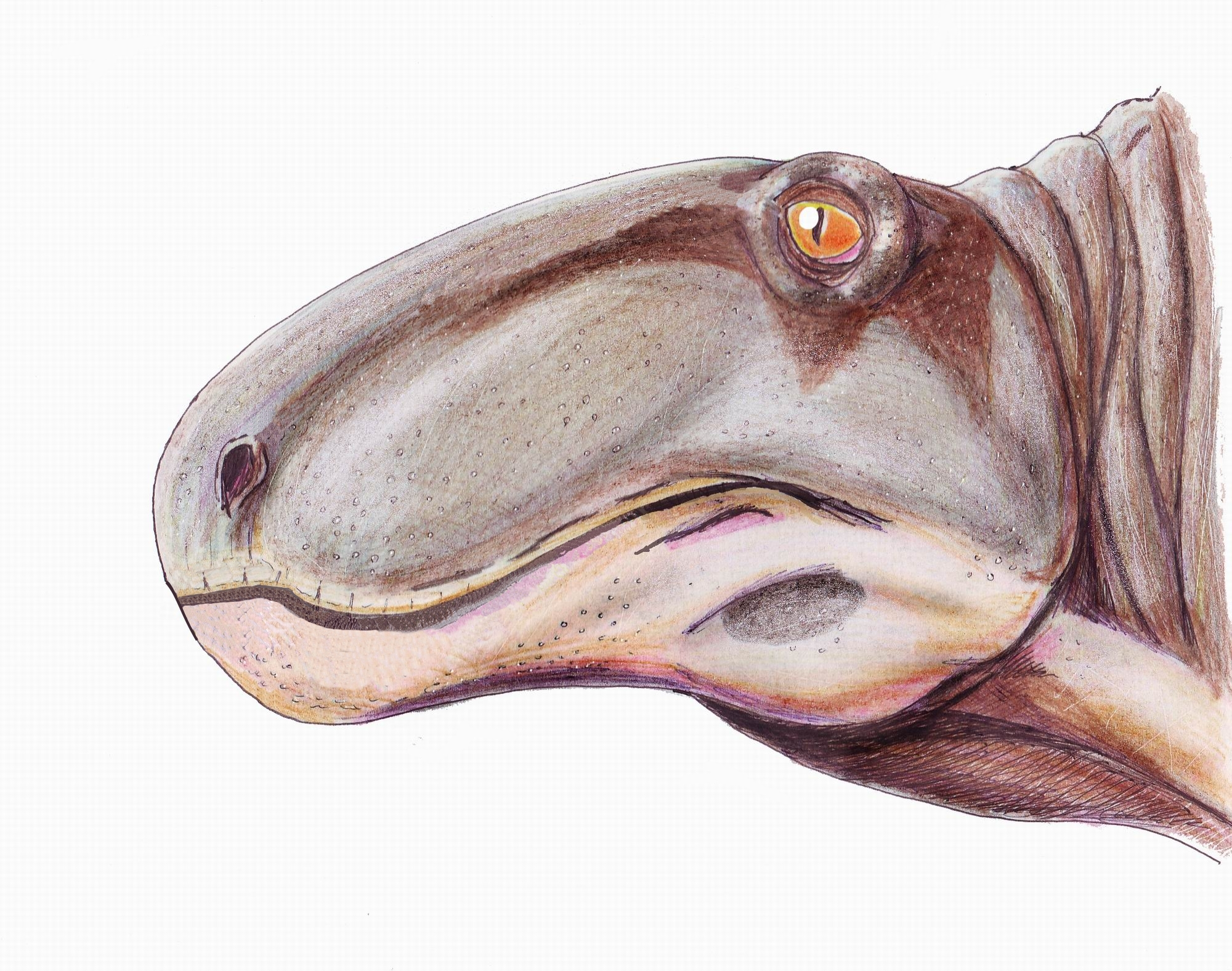
- Restorative portrait of the Permian synapsid (mammal precursor) Steppesaurus
  †Steppesaurus – type locality for genus
  - †Steppesaurus gurleyi – type locality for species
- †Stereodictyum – type locality for genus
  - †Stereodictyum orthoplectum – type locality for species
- †Stereophallodon – type locality for genus
  - †Stereophallodon ciscoensis – type locality for species
- †Stereostylus
  - †Stereostylus adelus – type locality for species
- †Stethacanthulus
  - †Stethacanthulus decorus
  - †Stethacanthulus meccaensis
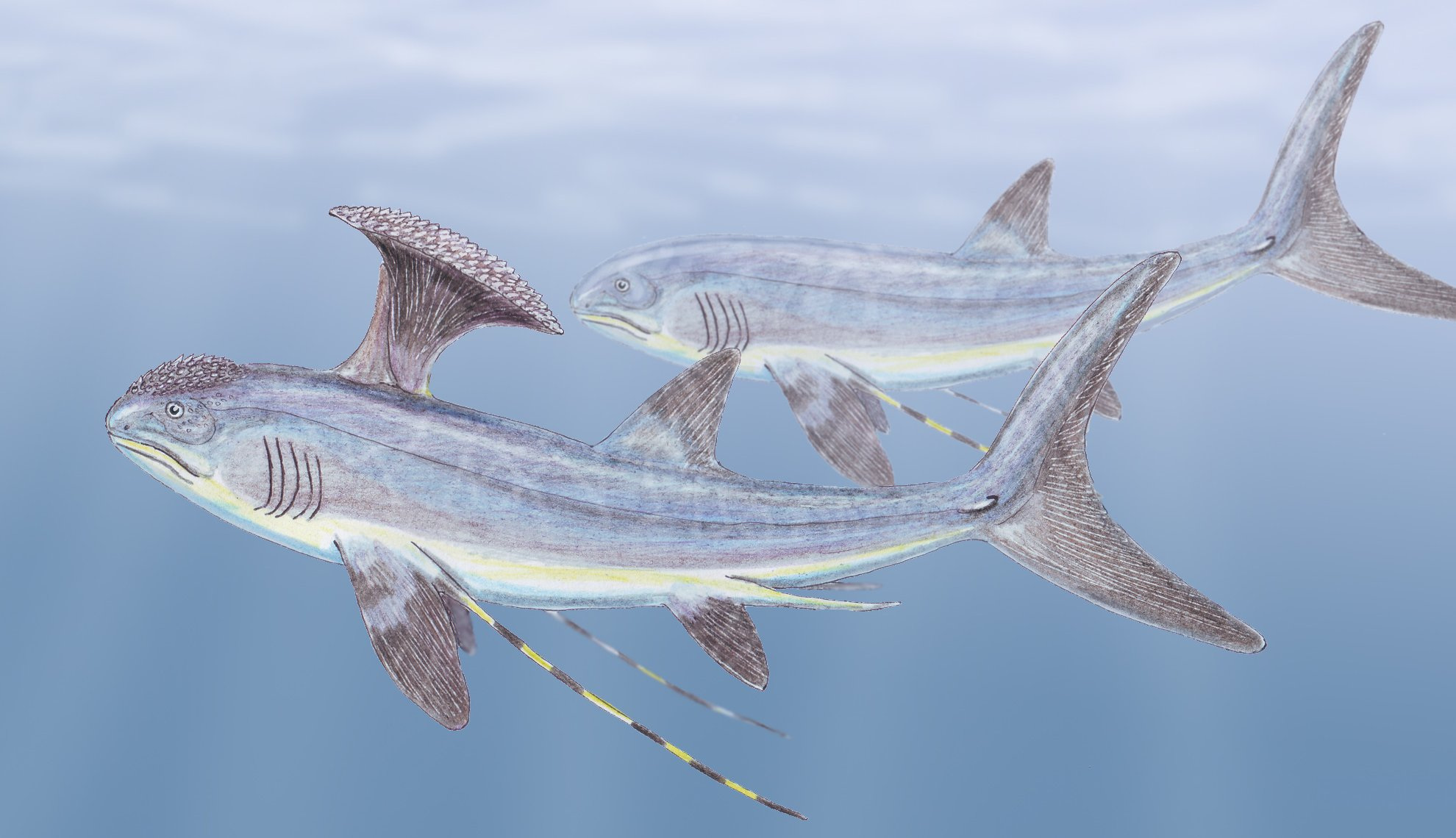
- Life restorations of a male (foreground) and female (background) of the Late Devonian-Carboniferous Chimaera relative Stethacanthus
  †Stethacanthus
  - †Stethacanthus meccaensis
- †Stewartina
  - †Stewartina convexa
  - †Stewartina texana
- †Stioderma – type locality for genus
  - †Stioderma coscinum – type locality for species
- †Straparollus
  - †Straparollus savagei
- †Stratispongia – type locality for genus
  - †Stratispongia cinctuta
- †Streblochondria
  - †Streblochondria sculptilis
- †Streblopteria
  - †Streblopteria montpelierensis
- †Streblotrypa
- †Strepsodiscus
  - †Strepsodiscus paucivoluta
- †Streptacis
  - †Streptacis inflata – type locality for species
  - †Streptacis permiana – type locality for species
  - †Streptacis piercei – type locality for species
  - †Streptacis type locality for species – informal
  - †Streptacis whitfieldi
- †Streptelasma
  - †Streptelasma divaricans
- †Streptorhynchus – report made of unidentified related form or using admittedly obsolete nomenclature
  - †Streptorhynchus shumardianus – tentative report
- †Striatites
  - †Striatites richteri
- †Striatosaccites
  - †Striatosaccites bullaeformis – type locality for species
  - †Striatosaccites perisporites – type locality for species
  - †Striatosaccites Type A – informal
- †Strigigenalis
- †Strigirhynchia
  - †Strigirhynchia elongata
  - †Strigirhynchia indentata – type locality for species
  - †Strigirhynchia transversa
- †Strigogoniatites
  - †Strigogoniatites fountaini – type locality for species
- †Strobeus
  - †Strobeus brevis
  - †Strobeus delawarensis – type locality for species
  - †Strobeus paludinaeformis
  - †Strobeus poromus
- †Stromatidium – type locality for genus
  - †Stromatidium typicale – type locality for species
- †Strophalosia
- †Strophella
  - †Strophella grandaevus
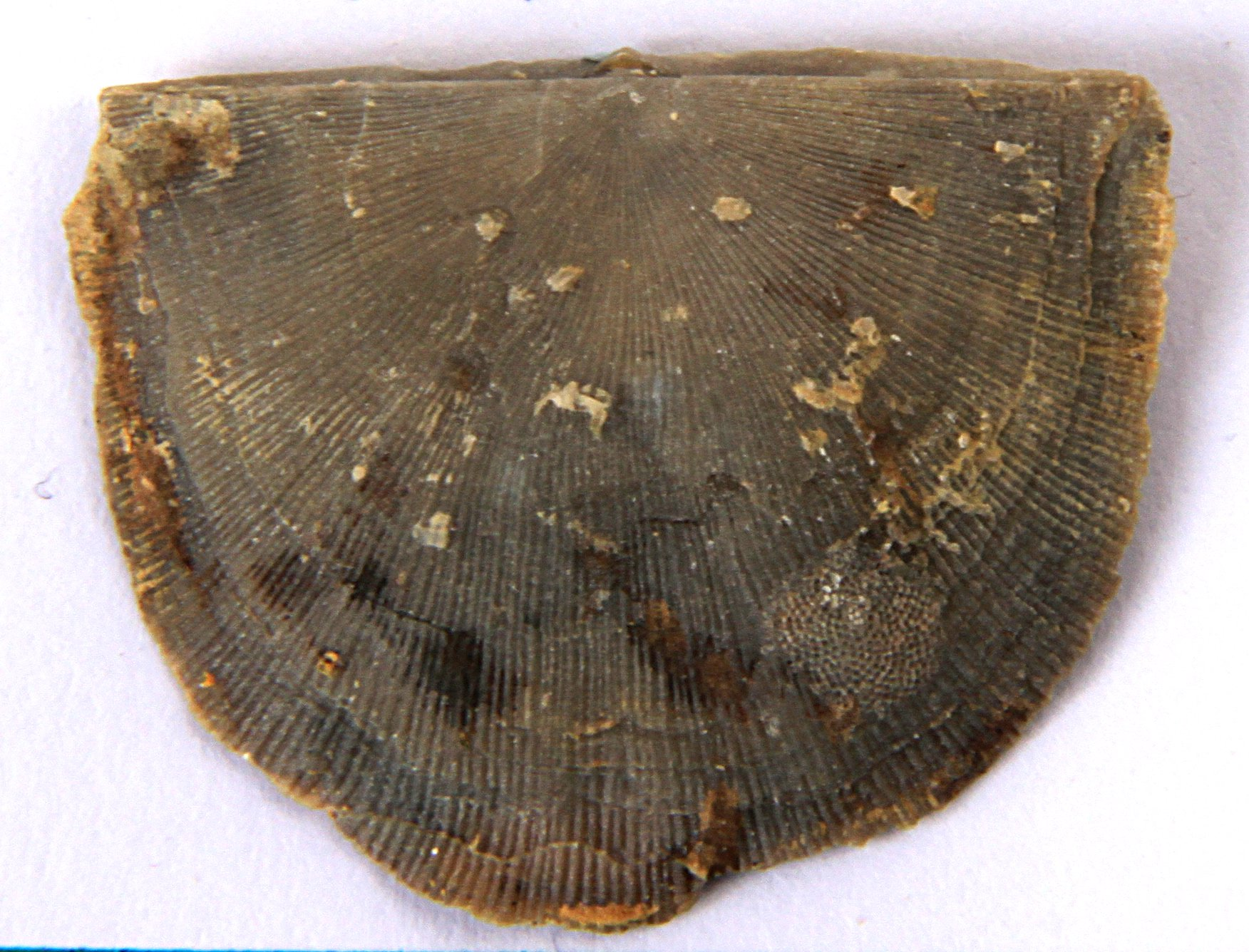
- Fossilized shell of the Ordovician-Silurian brachiopod Strophomena
  †Strophomena
  - †Strophomena neglecta
- †Stuartwellercrinus
  - †Stuartwellercrinus symmetricus – type locality for species
  - †Stuartwellercrinus texanus – type locality for species
  - †Stuartwellercrinus turbinatus – type locality for species
- †Stutchburia
- †Subkargalites
  - †Subkargalites hargisi – type locality for species
  - †Subkargalites parkeri
- †Subperrinites
  - †Subperrinites bakeri – type locality for species
  - †Subperrinites denhami – type locality for species
  - †Subperrinites mooreae – type locality for species
- †Sulcataria
  - †Sulcataria compacta
  - †Sulcataria latisulcata
- †Svetlanoceras
  - †Svetlanoceras moylei – type locality for species
- †Symphysurina
- †Syngastrioceras
  - †Syngastrioceras globulosum
  - †Syngastrioceras scotti
- †Synocladia
- †Syntrophina
- †Syntrophinella
- †Syringoclemis – tentative report
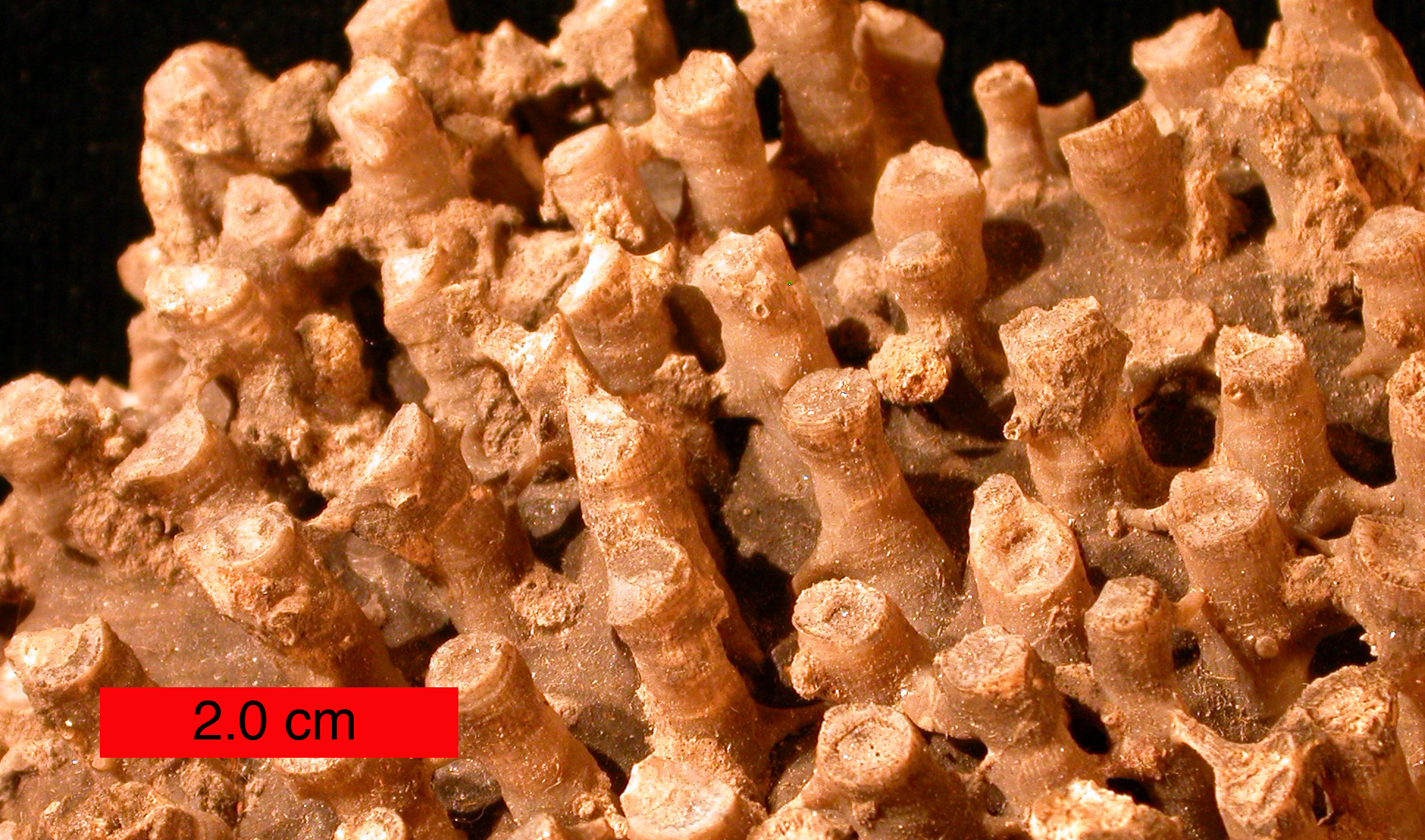
- Fossil of the Devonian tabulate coral Syringopora
  †Syringopora – tentative report

== T ==
- †Tabulipora
  - †Tabulipora carbonaria
- †Taenicephalus
- †Taeniopteris
  - †Taeniopteris abnormis
  - †Taeniopteris coriacea – tentative report
  - †Taeniopteris eckardtii
  - †Taeniopteris multinervis
- †Taeniopters
- †Tainoceras
  - †Tainoceras clydense – type locality for species
- †Taphrosestria
  - †Taphrosestria expansa
  - †Taphrosestria peculiaris
- †Tapinotomaria
  - †Tapinotomaria coronata – type locality for species
  - †Tapinotomaria costata – type locality for species
  - †Tapinotomaria crassa – type locality for species
  - †Tapinotomaria duplicostata – type locality for species
  - †Tapinotomaria globosa – type locality for species
  - †Tapinotomaria mirabilis – type locality for species
  - †Tapinotomaria pyramidalis – type locality for species
  - †Tapinotomaria rugosa – type locality for species
  - †Tapinotomaria submirabilis – type locality for species
- †Tappenosaurus – type locality for genus
  - †Tappenosaurus magnus – type locality for species
- †Tarphyceras
  - †Tarphyceras chadwickense
- †Tarthinia
- †Tautosia
  - †Tautosia angulata
  - †Tautosia distorta
  - †Tautosia elegans
  - †Tautosia expansa
  - †Tautosia fastigiata
  - †Tautosia galbina
  - †Tautosia lenumbona
  - †Tautosia magnisepta
  - †Tautosia podistra – type locality for species
  - †Tautosia pulchra
  - †Tautosia shumardiana
  - †Tautosia transenna – type locality for species
- †Teguliferina
  - †Teguliferina armata
  - †Teguliferina boesei – type locality for species
  - †Teguliferina compacta – type locality for species
  - †Teguliferina solidispinosa
- †Teiichispira
  - †Teiichispira nanus – type locality for species
- †Temnocheilus
- †Terebratula – report made of unidentified related form or using admittedly obsolete nomenclature
  - †Terebratula perinflata – type locality for species
- †Terebratuloidea
  - †Terebratuloidea triplicata
- †Tersomius – type locality for genus
  - †Tersomius texensis – type locality for species
- †Tesnusocaris – type locality for genus
  - †Tesnusocaris goldichi – type locality for species
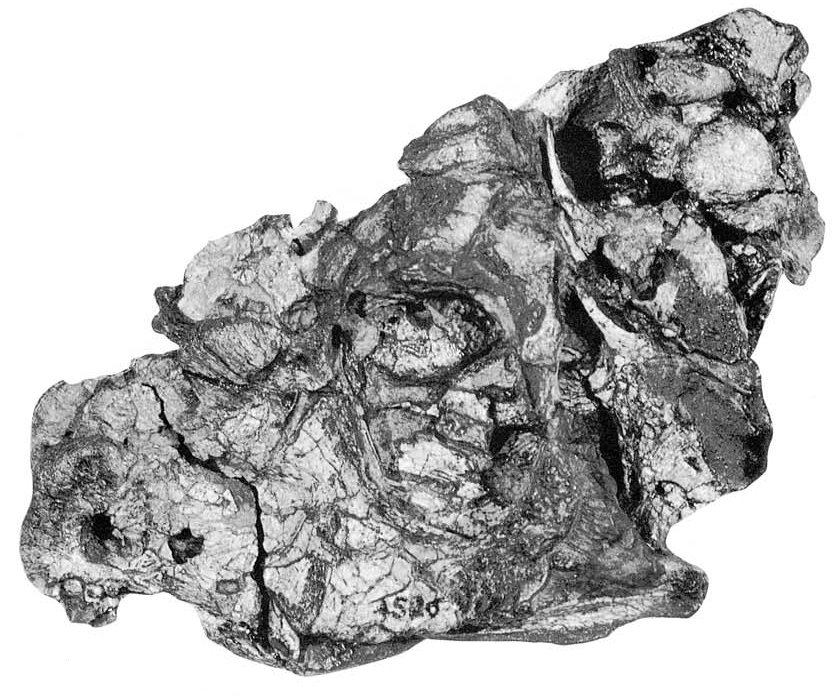
- Fossilized skull in multiple views of the Permian synapsid (mammal precursor) Tetraceratops
  †Tetraceratops – type locality for genus
  - †Tetraceratops insignis – type locality for species
- †Tetralobula
- †Tetrataxis
- †Tetravirga
- †Texarina
  - †Texarina elongata – type locality for species
  - †Texarina oblongata
  - †Texarina parallela
  - †Texarina paucula
  - †Texarina solida
  - †Texarina wordensis – type locality for species
- †Texasodus – type locality for genus
  - †Texasodus varidentatus – type locality for species
- †Texoceras
  - †Texoceras texanum – type locality for species
- †Thaerodonta
  - †Thaerodonta recedens – or unidentified comparable form
- †Thalattocanthus
  - †Thalattocanthus consonus
- †Thamniscus
  - †Thamniscus digitatus – type locality for species
- †Thamnosia
  - †Thamnosia anterospinosa
  - †Thamnosia arctica
  - †Thamnosia capitanensis
  - †Thamnosia parvispinosa
  - †Thamnosia phragmophora
  - †Thamnosia silicica
- †Thedusia – type locality for genus
  - †Thedusia angustata
  - †Thedusia biconvexa
  - †Thedusia bucrenata
  - †Thedusia dischides
  - †Thedusia discissa
  - †Thedusia emarginata
  - †Thedusia magna
  - †Thedusia mesocostata
  - †Thedusia paucicostata
  - †Thedusia procera – type locality for species
  - †Thedusia trigonalis
  - †Thedusia ventricosa
- †Thigriffides
  - †Thigriffides roundyi
- †Thuroholia
  - †Thuroholia cribriformis
- †Timaniella
  - †Timaniella pseudocamerata
- †Timanodictya – tentative report
- †Timorina
  - †Timorina attenuata
  - †Timorina ovata
  - †Timorina schuchertensis – type locality for species
- †Timorites
  - †Timorites schucherti – or unidentified comparable form
  - †Timorites uddeni – type locality for species
- †Tingia
- †Tinsleya – type locality for genus
  - †Tinsleya texana – type locality for species
- †Tomicosaurus – report made of unidentified related form or using admittedly obsolete nomenclature
- †Toomeyospongia – type locality for genus
  - †Toomeyospongia apachensis – type locality for species
  - †Toomeyospongia gigantia – type locality for species
  - †Toomeyospongia modica – type locality for species
- †Toomeyospongiella – type locality for genus
  - †Toomeyospongiella minuta – type locality for species
- †Tornquistia – tentative report
  - †Tornquistia transversalis – type locality for species
- †Torynechus
  - †Torynechus alectorius
  - †Torynechus caelatus – type locality for species
- †Tostonia
- †Trabeculites – type locality for genus
  - †Trabeculites keithae – type locality for species
- †Trachydomia
  - †Trachydomia turbonitella – type locality for species
- †Trailospongia – type locality for genus
  - †Trailospongia reischi – type locality for species
- †Transennatia
  - †Transennatia gratiosa
- †Trepospira
  - †Trepospira depressa
  - †Trepospira discoidalis
  - †Trepospira illinoisensis
  - †Trepospira sphaerulata
- †Trepsipleura – type locality for genus
  - †Trepsipleura chordanodosa – type locality for species
  - †Trepsipleura nodosa – type locality for species
- †Trichasaurus – type locality for genus
  - †Trichasaurus texensis – type locality for species
- †Tricoria
  - †Tricoria hirpex
- †Tricrepicephalus
  - †Tricrepicephalus coria
  - †Tricrepicephalus texanus
- †Trigonoglossa
  - †Trigonoglossa nebrascensis
- †Trigonoproductus
  - †Trigonoproductus inexpectans
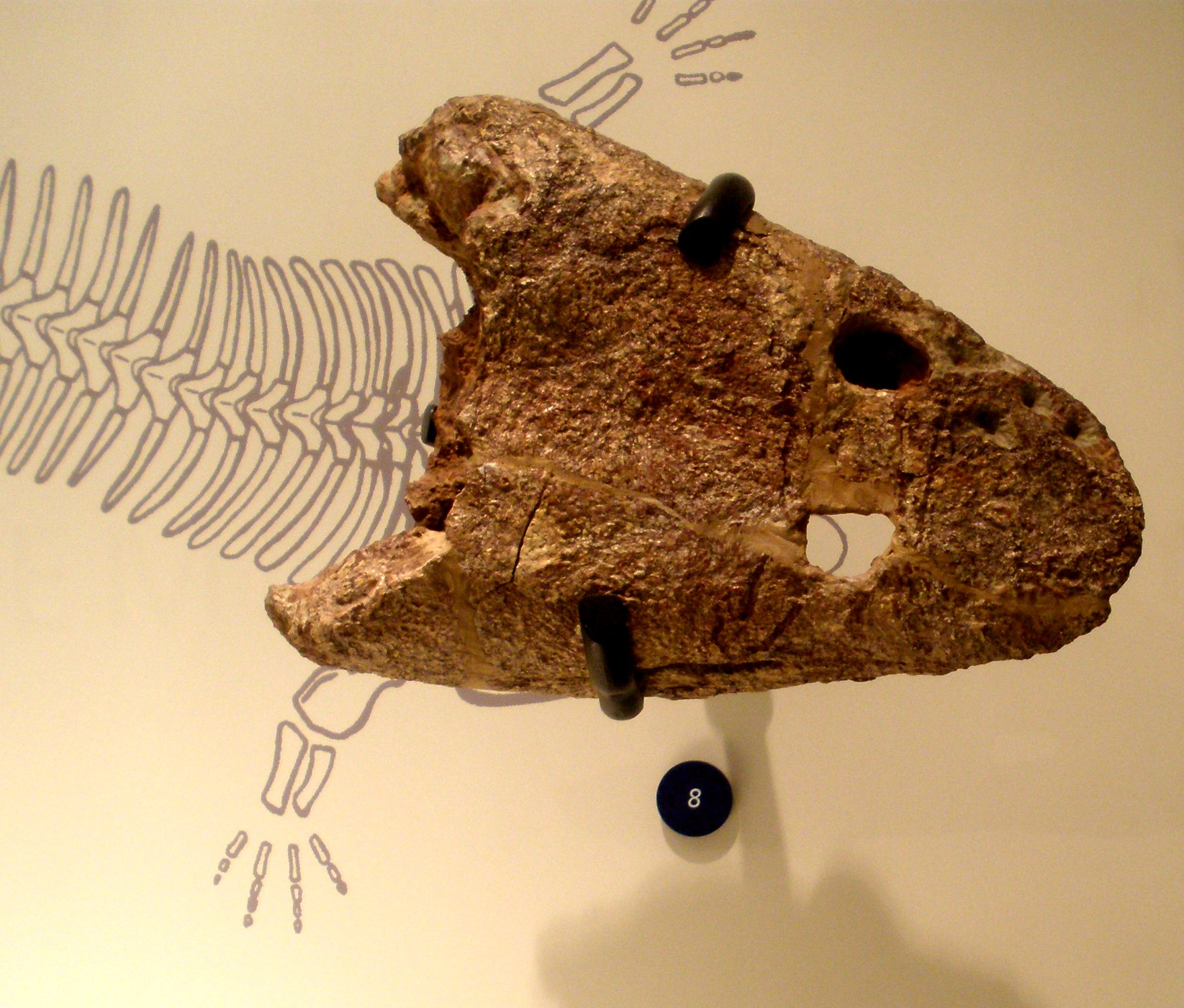
- Fossilized skull of the Permian amphibian Trimerorhachis
  †Trimerorhachis
  - †Trimerorhachis greggi – type locality for species
  - †Trimerorhachis insignis – type locality for species
  - †Trimerorhachis mesops – type locality for species
  - †Trimerorhachis rogersi – type locality for species
- †Triproetus
  - †Triproetus altasulcus – type locality for species
  - †Triproetus angustus – type locality for species
  - †Triproetus tumidus – type locality for species
- †Tristratocoelia
  - †Tristratocoelia rhythmica
- †Triticites
  - †Triticites cellamagnus – or unidentified comparable form
- †Trochilioceras – type locality for genus
  - †Trochilioceras tenuosum – type locality for species
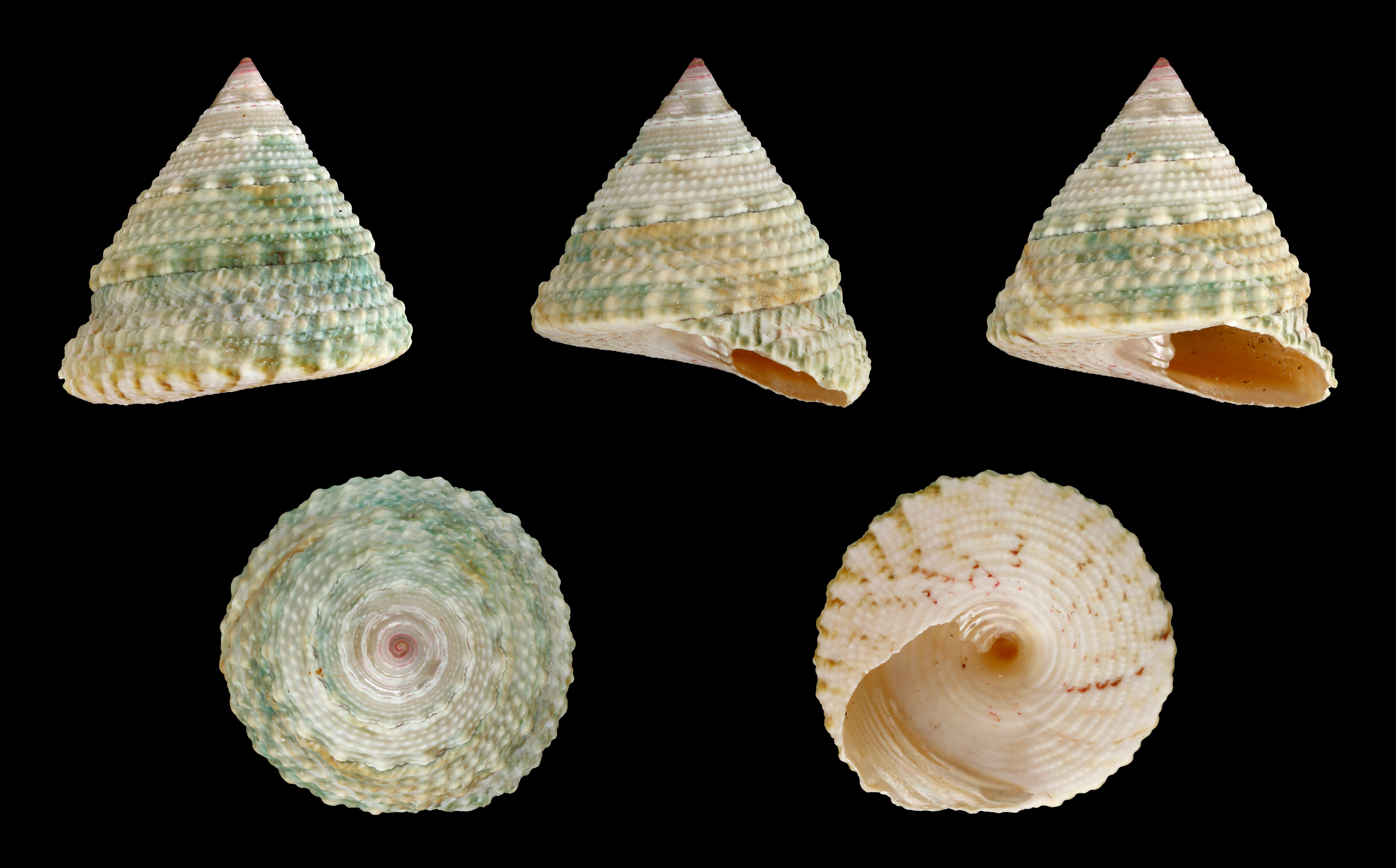
- Shell in multiple views of a Trochus top sea snail
  Trochus – report made of unidentified related form or using admittedly obsolete nomenclature
- †Trophisina
  - †Trophisina fenaria
- †Tropidelasma
  - †Tropidelasma anthicum – type locality for species
  - †Tropidelasma corniculum
  - †Tropidelasma costellatum – type locality for species
  - †Tropidelasma culmenatum
  - †Tropidelasma furcillatum
  - †Tropidelasma gregarium – type locality for species
  - †Tropidelasma perattenuatum – type locality for species
  - †Tropidelasma pygmaeum – type locality for species
  - †Tropidelasma rhamphodes – type locality for species
  - †Tropidelasma robertsi
  - †Tropidelasma strobilum – type locality for species
  - †Tropidelasma undulatum – type locality for species
- Trypetesa
  - †Trypetesa caveata
- †Tschernyschewia
  - †Tschernyschewia americana
- †Tuberitina
- †Tumulites
  - †Tumulites varians – or unidentified comparable form
- †Tunstallia – report made of unidentified related form or using admittedly obsolete nomenclature
  - †Tunstallia helicina – tentative report
- Turbo – report made of unidentified related form or using admittedly obsolete nomenclature
  - †Turbo guadalupensis – type locality for species
  - †Turbo texanus – type locality for species
- †Turgidiffia – type locality for genus
  - †Turgidiffia columellata – type locality for species
  - †Turgidiffia completa – type locality for species
  - †Turgidiffia composita – type locality for species
- †Tylothyris
  - †Tylothyris brevaurita – type locality for species
  - †Tylothyris missouriensis – or unidentified comparable form

== U ==
- †Uddenites – type locality for genus
  - †Uddenites harlani – type locality for species
  - †Uddenites oweni – type locality for species
  - †Uddenites schucherti – type locality for species
  - †Uddenites serratus – type locality for species
- †Uddenoceras
  - †Uddenoceras oweni
- †Ullmannia
- †Ulocrinus
- †Ulrichotrypa – tentative report
- †Uncinuloides
  - †Uncinuloides guadalupensis
- †Undellaria
  - †Undellaria magnifica
- †Undulella
  - †Undulella guadalupensis
  - †Undulella matutina
  - †Undulella undulata – type locality for species

== V ==
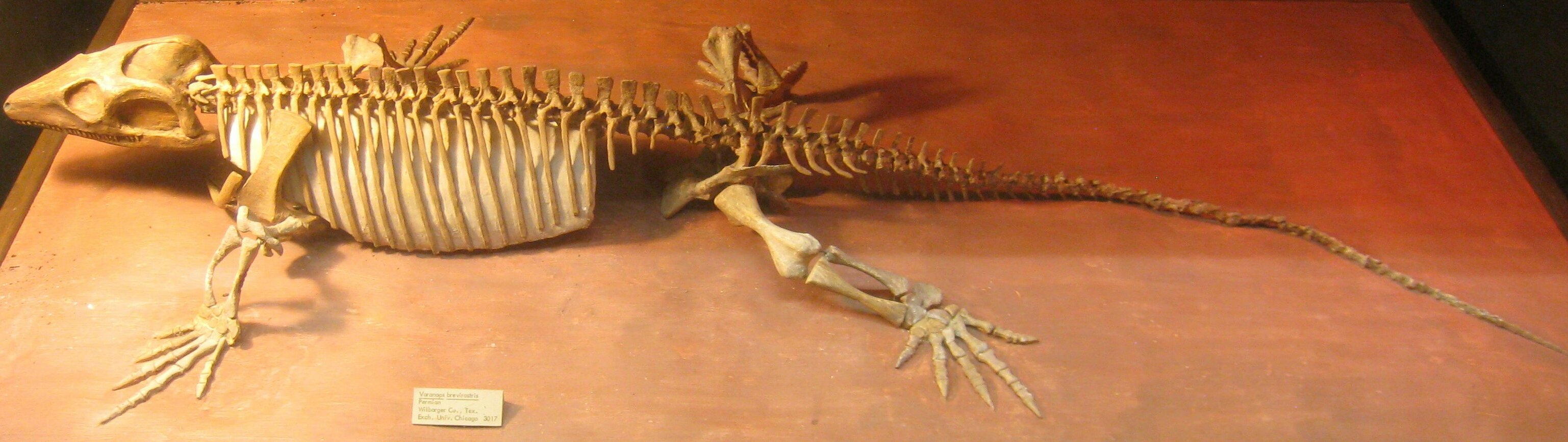
- Mounted fossilized skeleton of the Permian synapsid (mammal precursor) Varanops
  †Varanops
  - †Varanops brevirostris – type locality for species
- †Varanosaurus – type locality for genus
  - †Varanosaurus acutirostris – type locality for species
  - †Varanosaurus wichitaensis – type locality for species
- †Varialepis – report made of unidentified related form or using admittedly obsolete nomenclature
- †Vesicaspora
  - †Vesicaspora schaubergeri
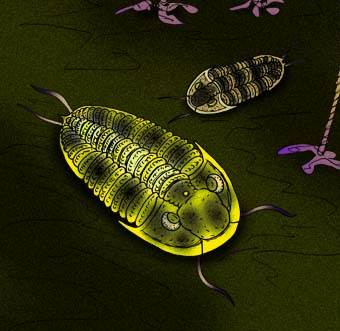
- Restoration of the Permian trilobite Vidria
  †Vidria
  - †Vidria vespa
- †Vidrioceras
  - †Vidrioceras irregulare – type locality for species
  - †Vidrioceras uddeni – type locality for species
- †Virgola
  - †Virgola neptunia
  - †Virgola rigida
- †Voiseyella
  - †Voiseyella texana – type locality for species
- †Vorticina
  - †Vorticina keytei – type locality for species

== W ==
- †Waagenella
  - †Waagenella crassus
  - †Waagenella lineatus – type locality for species
  - †Waagenella plummeri – type locality for species
- †Waagenina
  - †Waagenina rothi – type locality for species
- †Waagenoceras
  - †Waagenoceras dieneri
- †Waagenoconcha
  - †Waagenoconcha convexa
  - †Waagenoconcha leonardensis – type locality for species
  - †Waagenoconcha magnifica – type locality for species
  - †Waagenoconcha platys
  - †Waagenoconcha prophetica
  - †Waagenoconcha sulcata
- †Waggoneria – type locality for genus
  - †Waggoneria knoxensis – type locality for species
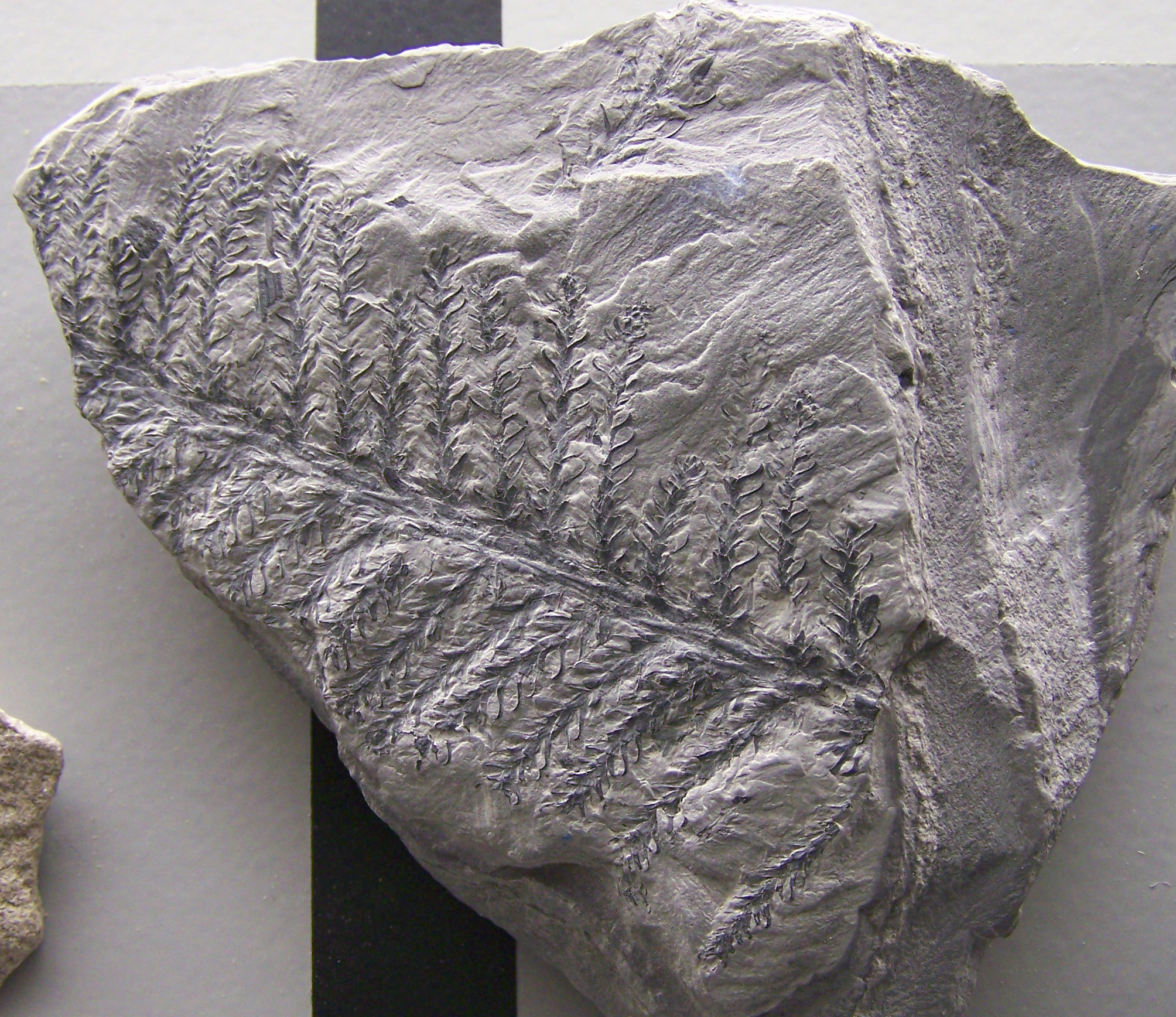
- Fossilized foliage of the Carboniferous-Permian conifer Walchia
  †Walchia
  - †Walchia piniformis
  - †Walchia schlotheimii
  - †Walchia schneideri
- †Walchiostrobus
- †Walliserodus
- †Warthia
  - †Warthia americana – type locality for species
  - †Warthia angustior – type locality for species
  - †Warthia crassus – type locality for species
  - †Warthia fissus – type locality for species
  - †Warthia saundersi – type locality for species
  - †Warthia waageni – type locality for species
  - †Warthia welleri
- †Wattia – type locality for genus
  - †Wattia texana – type locality for species
- †Wellerella
  - †Wellerella bidentata
  - †Wellerella girtyi – type locality for species
  - †Wellerella nitidula
  - †Wellerella osagensis
- †Wellerites – type locality for genus
  - †Wellerites mohri – type locality for species
- †Whitspakia
  - †Whitspakia schucherti
- †Wiedeyoceras
  - †Wiedeyoceras pingue
- †Wilbernicyathus
  - †Wilbernicyathus donegani
- †Wilkingia
  - †Wilkingia dubium – or unidentified comparable form
  - †Wilkingia rothi
  - †Wilkingia terminale
- †Woosteroceras
  - †Woosteroceras cherokeense
  - †Woosteroceras flexiseptatum – type locality for species
  - †Woosteroceras percurvatum – type locality for species
  - †Woosteroceras spirale – type locality for species
- †Worthenia
  - †Worthenia alticarinata – type locality for species
  - †Worthenia arizonensis
  - †Worthenia bialveozona
  - †Worthenia bicarinata – type locality for species
  - †Worthenia corrugata
  - †Worthenia crenulata
  - †Worthenia kingi – type locality for species
  - †Worthenia latialveozona
  - †Worthenia pilula – type locality for species
  - †Worthenia planalveozona
  - †Worthenia speciosa
  - †Worthenia tabulata
  - †Worthenia whitehorsensis – type locality for species
- †Wortheniopsis
- †Wurmiella
  - †Wurmiella excavata

== X ==
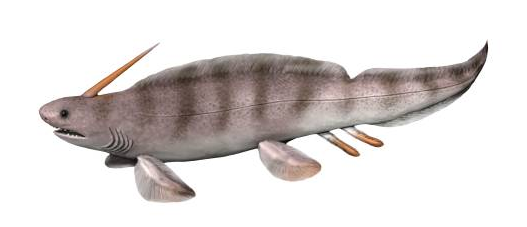
- Restoration of the Late Devonian–Triassic freshwater shark Xenacanthus
  †Xenacanthus
  - †Xenacanthus platypternus
  - †Xenacanthus texensis
- †Xenechinus – type locality for genus
  - †Xenechinus parvus – type locality for species
- †Xenelasma
  - †Xenelasma synthrophioides
- †Xenosaria
  - †Xenosaria exotica
- †Xenosteges – type locality for genus
  - †Xenosteges adherens – type locality for species
  - †Xenosteges anomalus
  - †Xenosteges magnus
  - †Xenosteges quadratus – type locality for species
  - †Xenosteges trivialis
  - †Xenosteges umbonatus
- †Xestosia – type locality for genus
  - †Xestosia obsolescens
  - †Xestosia schucherti – type locality for species
- †Xinjiangospira
  - †Xinjiangospira type locality for species – informal
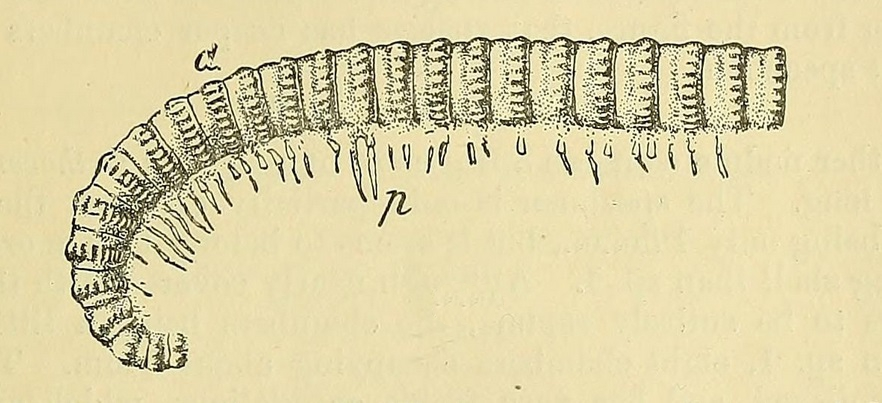
- Illustration of a fossil of the Carboniferous millipede Xyloiulus
  †Xyloiulus – tentative report

== Y ==
- †Yakovlevia
  - †Yakovlevia anterospinosa
  - †Yakovlevia costellata
  - †Yakovlevia hessorum
  - †Yakovlevia immatura
  - †Yakovlevia indentata
  - †Yakovlevia intermedia
  - †Yakovlevia multistriata
  - †Yakovlevia sulcata
- †Yochelsonellisa
  - †Yochelsonellisa eximia
- Yoldia – tentative report
  - †Yoldia subscitula
- †Yunnania

== Z ==
- †Zaphrenthis
  - †Zaphrenthis gibsoni
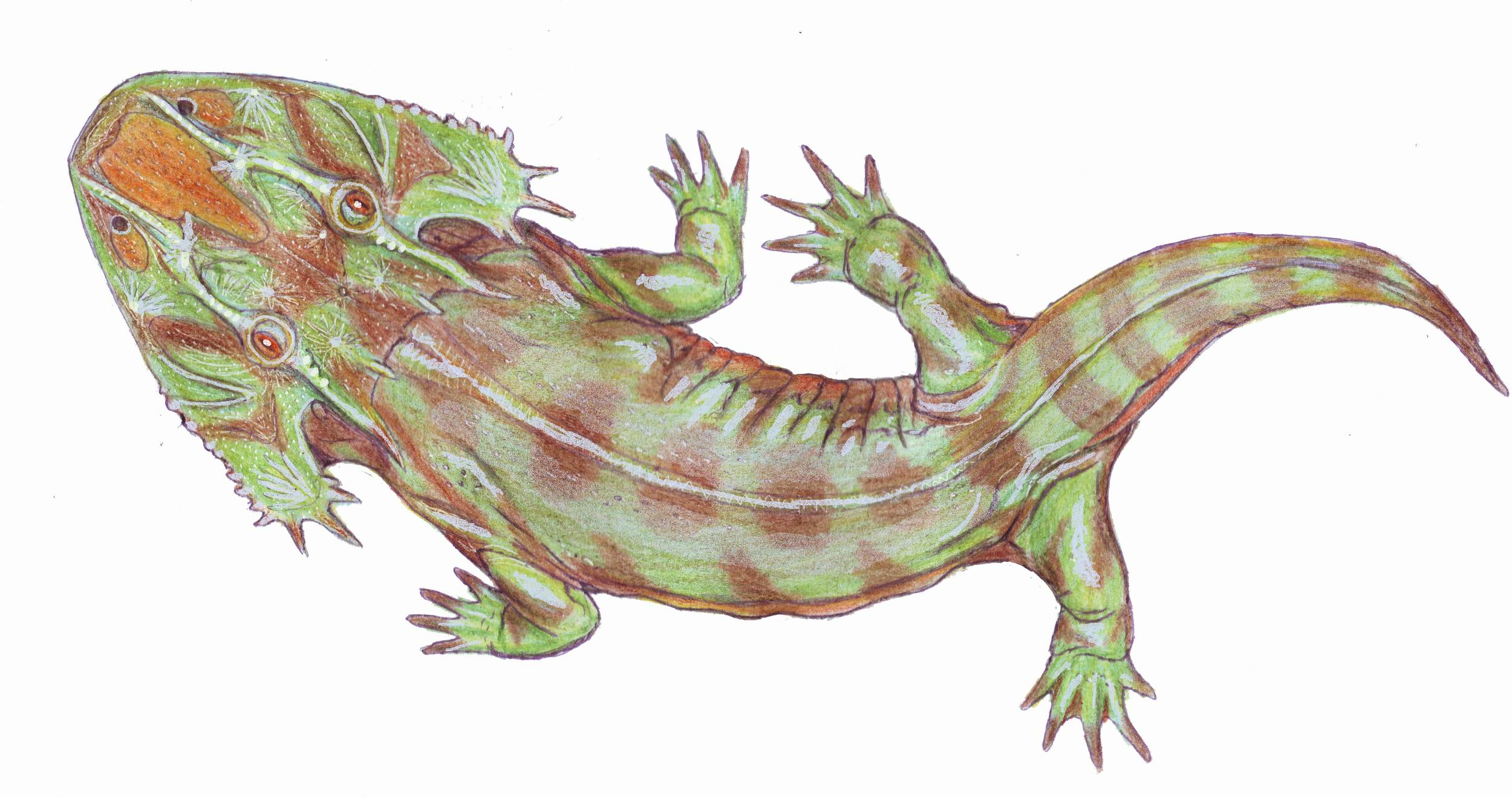
- Life restoration of the Permian amphibian Zatrachys
  †Zatrachys
  - †Zatrachys conchigerus – type locality for species
  - †Zatrachys serratus
- †Zeilleropteris
  - †Zeilleropteris wattii – type locality for species
- †Zhonglupuceras
  - †Zhonglupuceras mapesi
- †Zygopleura
  - †Zygopleura swalloviana – type locality for species
- †Zygospira
  - †Zygospira resupinata
