= List of the Paleozoic life of Oklahoma =

This list of the Paleozoic life of Oklahoma contains the various prehistoric life-forms whose fossilized remains have been reported from within the US state of Oklahoma and are between 541 and 252.17 million years of age.

== A ==
- †Abludoglyptocrinus
- †Abyssocrinus
  - †Abyssocrinus antiquus
- †Abyssomedon – type locality for genus
  - †Abyssomedon williamsi – type locality for species
- †Acanthobolbina
  - †Acanthobolbina loeblichi
- †Acanthocladia
  - †Acanthocladia ouachitensis
- †Acanthocrania
  - †Acanthocrania erecta
  - †Acanthocrania oklahomensis
  - †Acanthocrania subquadrata
- †Acanthopecten
  - †Acanthopecten grandis – type locality for species
- †Acanthospirina
- †Acanthotriletes
- †Acheloma
  - †Acheloma cumminsi – or unidentified comparable form
  - †Acheloma dunni – type locality for species
- †Acidiphorus
  - †Acidiphorus williamsi – or unidentified comparable form
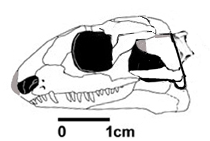
- Illustration of a fossilized skull in multiple views of the Permian primitive reptile Acleistorhinus
  †Acleistorhinus – type locality for genus
  - †Acleistorhinus pteroticus – type locality for species
- †Acolocrinus
  - †Acolocrinus crinerensis
- †Actinotodissus
  - †Actinotodissus longitaleosus
- †Adairia
  - †Adairia adairensis – type locality for species
- †Adornofusa
  - †Adornofusa microhapsis
- †Aechmina
  - †Aechmina geneae
  - †Aechmina longispina
  - †Aechmina truncata – tentative report
- †Aechminaria
  - †Aechminaria ambigua
  - †Aechminaria longispina
  - †Aechminaria truncata – tentative report
- †Aechminella
  - †Aechminella buchanani – type locality for species
  - †Aechminella trispinosa – type locality for species
- †Affinocrinus
  - †Affinocrinus grandis – type locality for species
  - †Affinocrinus normalis
  - †Affinocrinus orbis – type locality for species
  - †Affinocrinus politus – type locality for species
  - †Affinocrinus progressus – type locality for species
- †Alatisporites
  - †Alatisporites pustulatus
- †Albertoceras
  - †Albertoceras minimum
- †Alcimocrinus
  - †Alcimocrinus girtyi
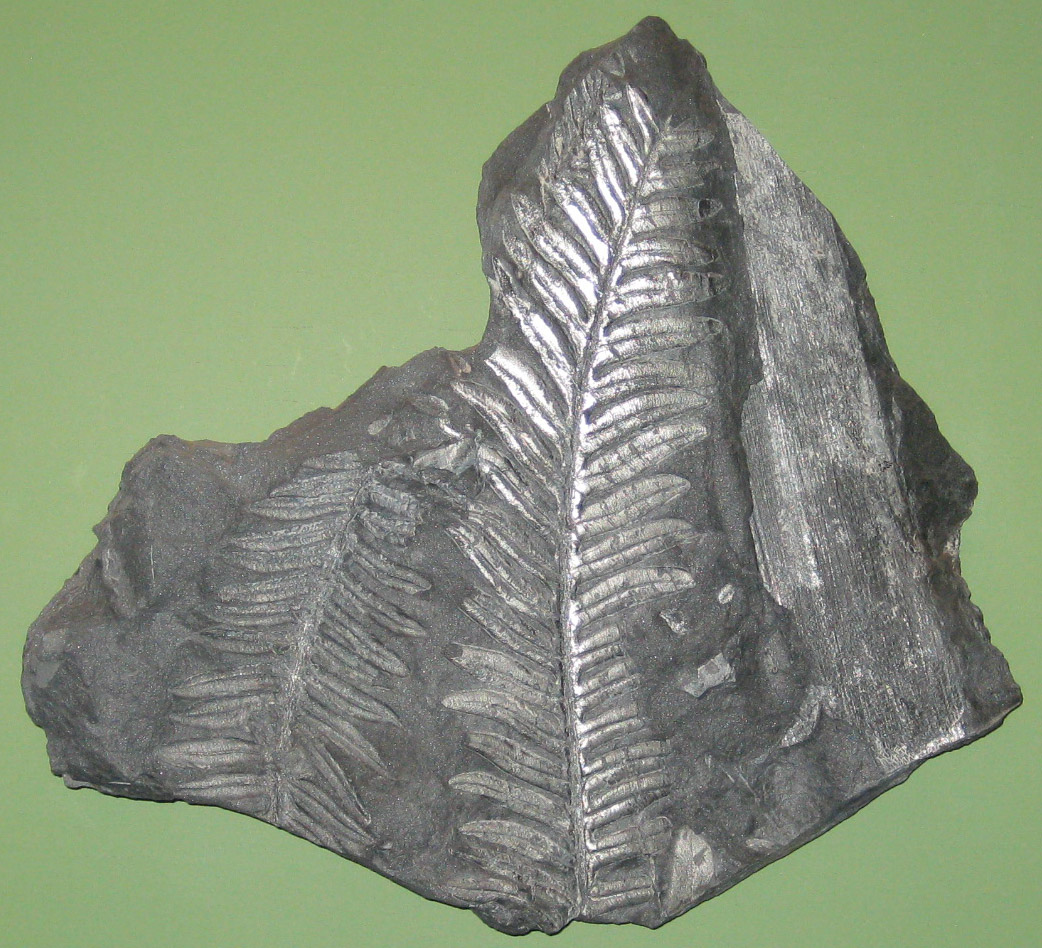
- Fossilized fronds of the Carboniferous-Early Cretaceous seed fern Alethopteris
  †Alethopteris
  - †Alethopteris ambigua
  - †Alethopteris lesquereuxii
  - †Alethopteris serlii
  - †Alethopteris sullivantii
- †Alexandrinia
  - †Alexandrinia directa – type locality for species
- †Alisporites
  - †Alisporites aequus – type locality for species
  - †Alisporites zapfei
- †Allocrinus
  - †Allocrinus divergens
  - †Allocrinus globulus
  - †Allocrinus irroratus
- †Alloiopteris
- †Allorisma
  - †Allorisma albequus
  - †Allorisma maynardwhitei – type locality for species
  - †Allorisma snideri – type locality for species
- †Allotropiophyllum – or unidentified comparable form
- †Amarixys
  - †Amarixys gracilis
- †Amaurotoma – tentative report
  - †Amaurotoma knighti – type locality for species
- †Ameura
  - †Ameura major
- Ammobaculites
- Ammodiscus
- †Ammovertella
  - †Ammovertella inversa
- †Ampelocrinus
  - †Ampelocrinus convexus
- †Amphilichas
  - †Amphilichas subpunctatus
- †Amphipsalidocrinus
- †Amphiscapha
  - †Amphiscapha catilloides
- †Amphisella
- †Amphissites
  - †Amphissites bradfieldi – type locality for species
  - †Amphissites bushi – type locality for species
  - †Amphissites marginiferus
  - †Amphissites miseri – type locality for species
  - †Amphissites nodosus
  - †Amphissites rugosus
  - †Amphissites wapanuckensis
- †Amphistrophia
  - †Amphistrophia prolongata
- †Amsdenina
- †Amsdenoides
- †Amygdalocystites
  - †Amygdalocystites florealis
  - †Amygdalocystites tribrachiatus
- †Anabathra
  - †Anabathra pulcherrima
- †Anachoropteris
  - †Anachoropteris gillotii
  - †Anachoropteris involuta
- †Anachroropteris
  - †Anachroropteris involuta
- †Ananaspis
  - †Ananaspis guttulus
- †Anapiculatasporites
  - †Anapiculatasporites spinosus
- †Anapiculatisporites
  - †Anapiculatisporites edgarensis
  - †Anapiculatisporites spinosus
- †Anaplanisporites
- †Anasobella
- †Anastrophia
  - †Anastrophia delicata
  - †Anastrophia grossa – type locality for species
- †Anataphrus
  - †Anataphrus kermiti – type locality for species
- †Anatiferocystis
  - †Anatiferocystis papillata
- †Anchicrinus
  - †Anchicrinus echinosacculus – type locality for species
  - †Anchicrinus planulatus – type locality for species
  - †Anchicrinus rugosus
- †Ancistrorhyncha
  - †Ancistrorhyncha costata
  - †Ancistrorhyncha globularis
- †Ancoradella
  - †Ancoradella ploeckensis
- †Anematina
- †Angelosaurus
  - †Angelosaurus romeri – type locality for species
- †Anguisporites
  - †Anguisporites contortus – type locality for species
  - †Anguisporites intonsus – type locality for species
- † Anisophyllum
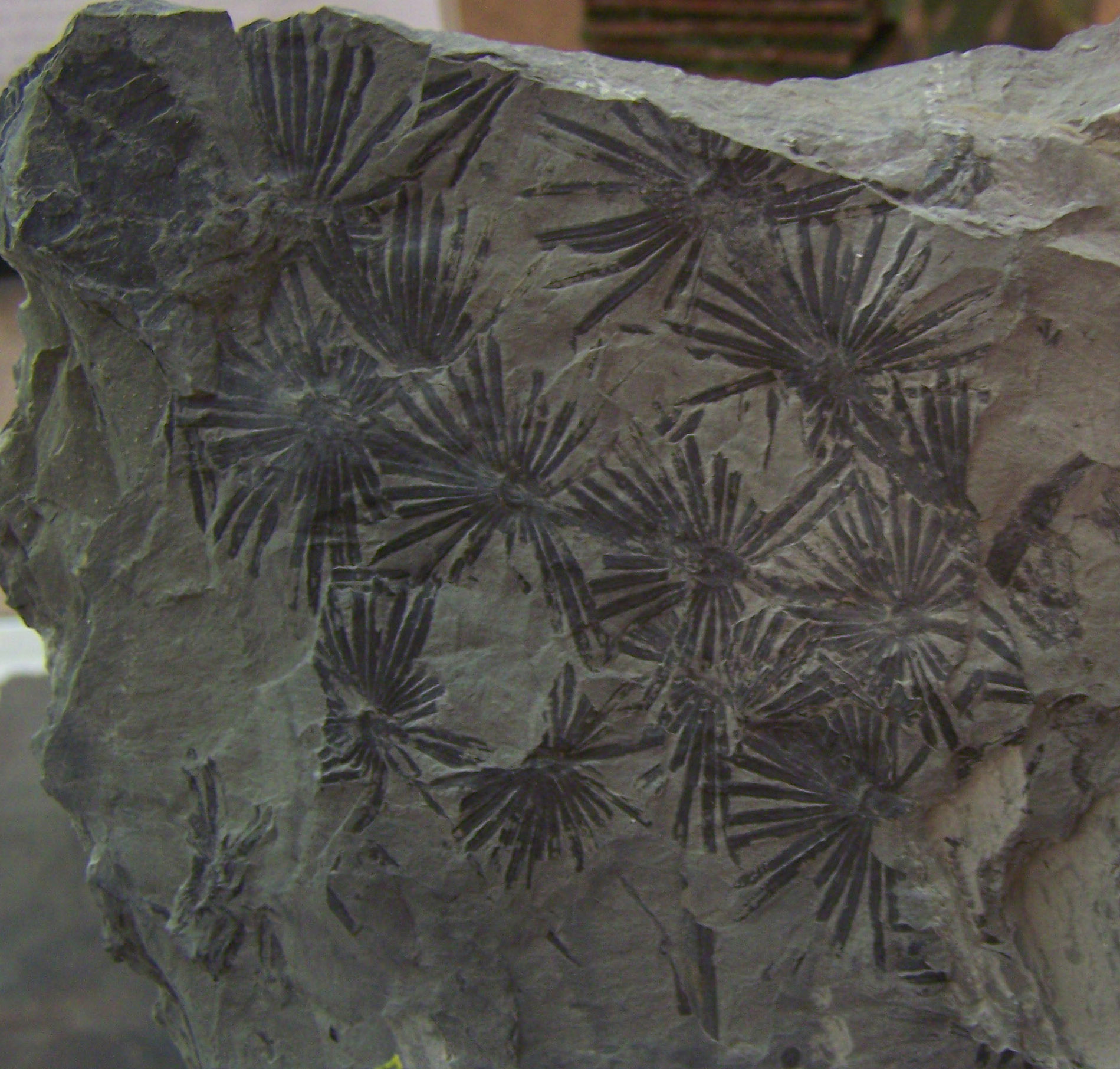
- Fossil of the Carboniferous horsetail relative Annularia
  †Annularia
  - †Annularia sphenophylloides
  - †Annularia stellata
- †Anobasicrinus
  - †Anobasicrinus obscurus
- †Anolotichia
  - †Anolotichia deckeri
  - †Anolotichia impolita
  - †Anolotichia spinulifera
- †Anomalogramma
  - †Anomalogramma parva
- †Anomalohymen – type locality for genus
  - †Anomalohymen dochmus – type locality for species
- †Anomalorthis
  - †Anomalorthis oklahomensis
- †Anomphalus
- †Anthracoceras
  - †Anthracoceras oklahomense – type locality for species
- †Anthracocrinus
  - †Anthracocrinus primitivus
- †Anthraconeilo
  - †Anthraconeilo taffiana
- †Anthracospirifer
  - †Anthracospirifer opimus
- †Anthracotarbus – type locality for genus
  - †Anthracotarbus hintoni – type locality for species
- †Anthyrsis
- †Antiquatonia
- †Antirhynchonella
  - †Antirhynchonella thomasi
- †Anulocrinus
  - †Anulocrinus drummuckensis – or unidentified related form
- †Apachella
  - †Apachella capertoni – type locality for species
- †Aparchites
  - †Aparchites maccoyii
  - †Aparchites millepunctatus
  - †Aparchites perforata
- †Aphlebia
- †Apianurus
- †Apiculatasporites
  - †Apiculatasporites latigranifer
  - †Apiculatasporites setulosus
  - †Apiculatasporites spinulistratus
- †Apodasmocrinus
  - †Apodasmocrinus daubei
- †Apographiocrinus
- †Apotocardium
  - †Apotocardium lanterna
  - †Apotocardium plautum
- †Apsidoneura
  - †Apsidoneura flexa
- †Arakespongia – type locality for genus
  - †Arakespongia mega – type locality for species
- †Araucarites
- †Arbucklecystis
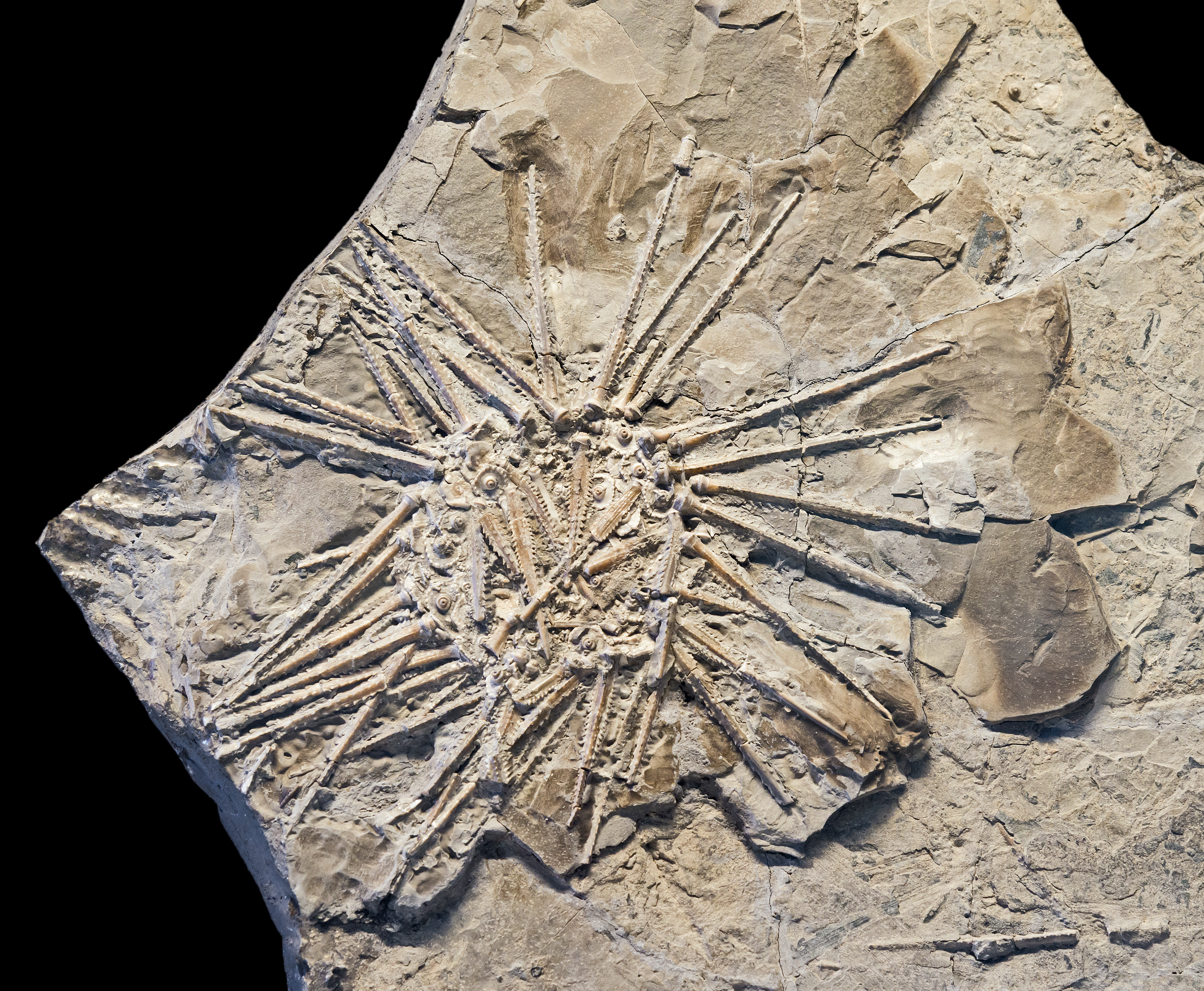
- Fossilized shell and spines of the Late Devonian-Permian sea urchin Archaeocidaris
  †Archaeocidaris
  - †Archaeocidaris megastyla
- †Archaeocrinus
  - †Archaeocrinus lacunosus – or unidentified comparable form
  - †Archaeocrinus subglobosus
  - †Archaeocrinus subovalis
- Archaeolithophyllum
- †Archaeophiomusium
  - †Archaeophiomusium burrisi
- †Archaeoscyphia
  - †Archaeoscyphia annulata
- †Archeria
  - †Archeria victori – type locality for species
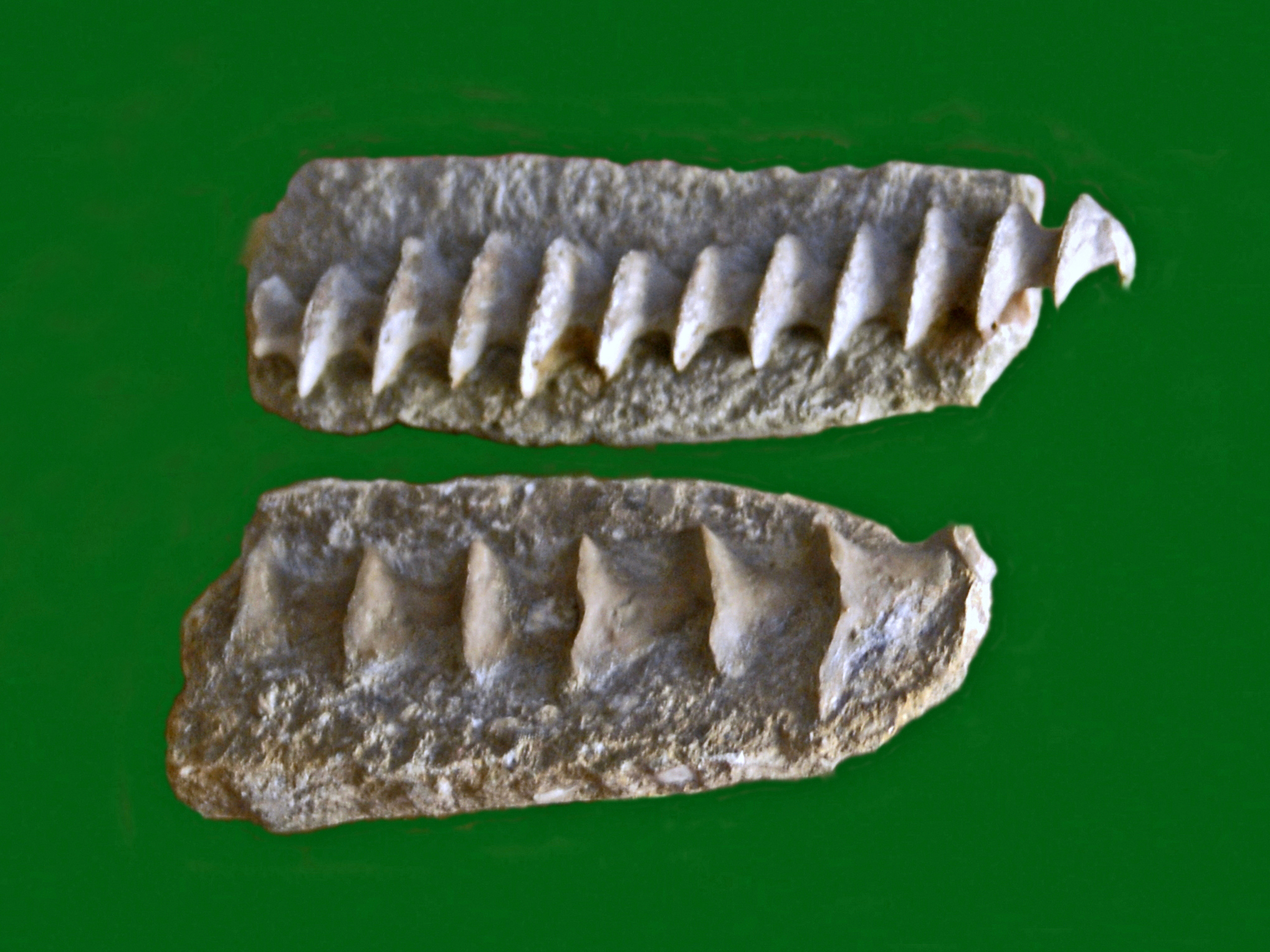
- Fossils of the Carboniferous-Permian bryozoan Archimedes
  †Archimedes
  - †Archimedes ardmorensis – type locality for species
  - †Archimedes distans
  - †Archimedes meekanoides
  - †Archimedes meekanus – or unidentified comparable form
  - †Archimedes perminimus – or unidentified related form
  - †Archimedes pitkinensis – type locality for species
  - †Archimedes pseudoswallovanus – type locality for species
  - †Archimedes sublaxus – or unidentified comparable form
- †Ardmosteges – type locality for genus
  - †Ardmosteges orchamus – type locality for species
- †Arkacrinus
  - †Arkacrinus constrictus – type locality for species
  - †Arkacrinus dubius
- †Arkanites
  - †Arkanites relictus
- †Arthropora
  - †Arthropora simplex
- †Artinska
  - †Artinska clara
  - †Artinska ovata
- †Asaphocrinus
  - †Asaphocrinus densus
- †Ascograptus
- †Asketopalla
  - †Asketopalla formosula
- †Aspidosaurus – or unidentified comparable form
- †Astartella
  - †Astartella concentrica
  - †Astartella vera
- †Asterophyllites
- †Asthenohymen
  - †Asthenohymen apicalis – type locality for species
  - †Asthenohymen latus – type locality for species
  - †Asthenohymen minutus – type locality for species
  - †Asthenohymen parvulus – type locality for species
  - †Asthenohymen triangularis – type locality for species
- †Astraeospongium
- †Astrocystites
- †Atactoporella
  - †Atactoporella bellula
- †Atelelasma
  - †Atelelasma oklahomense
- †Athlocrinus
  - †Athlocrinus dejustus – type locality for species
- †Athyris
- †Atokacrinus
  - †Atokacrinus tumulosus – type locality for species
- †Atrapocrinus – type locality for genus
  - †Atrapocrinus mutatus – type locality for species
- †Atribonium
  - †Atribonium evexum – or unidentified comparable form
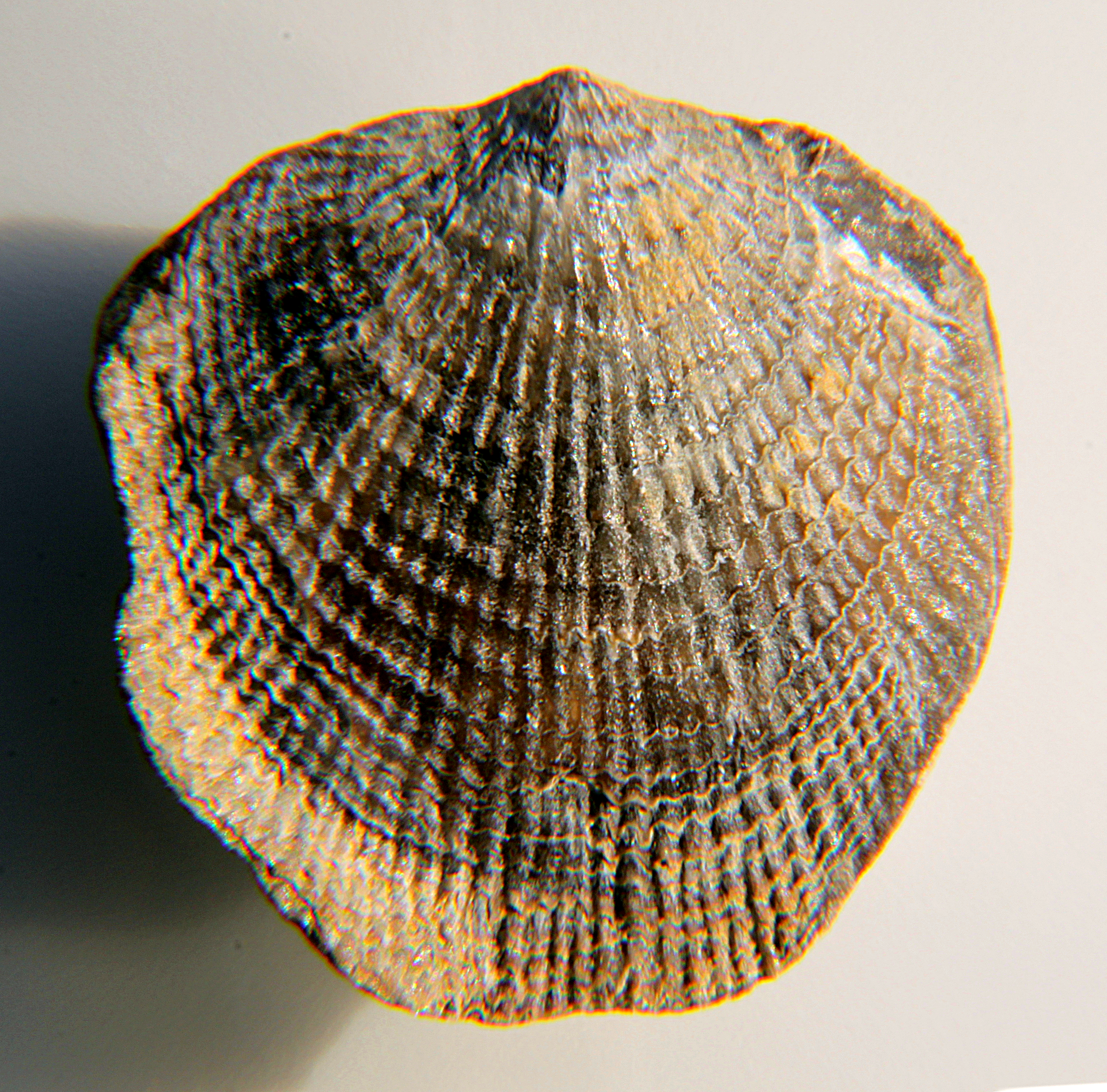
- Fossilized shell of the Late Ordovician-Carboniferous brachiopod Atrypa
  †Atrypa
  - †Atrypa arctostriata
  - †Atrypa oklahomensis
  - †Atrypa tennesseensis
- †Atrypina
  - †Atrypina hami
- †Aulacotheca – or unidentified comparable form
- †Aurimorpha
  - †Aurimorpha varia
- †Auriptygma
- †Austinella
  - †Austinella multicostella
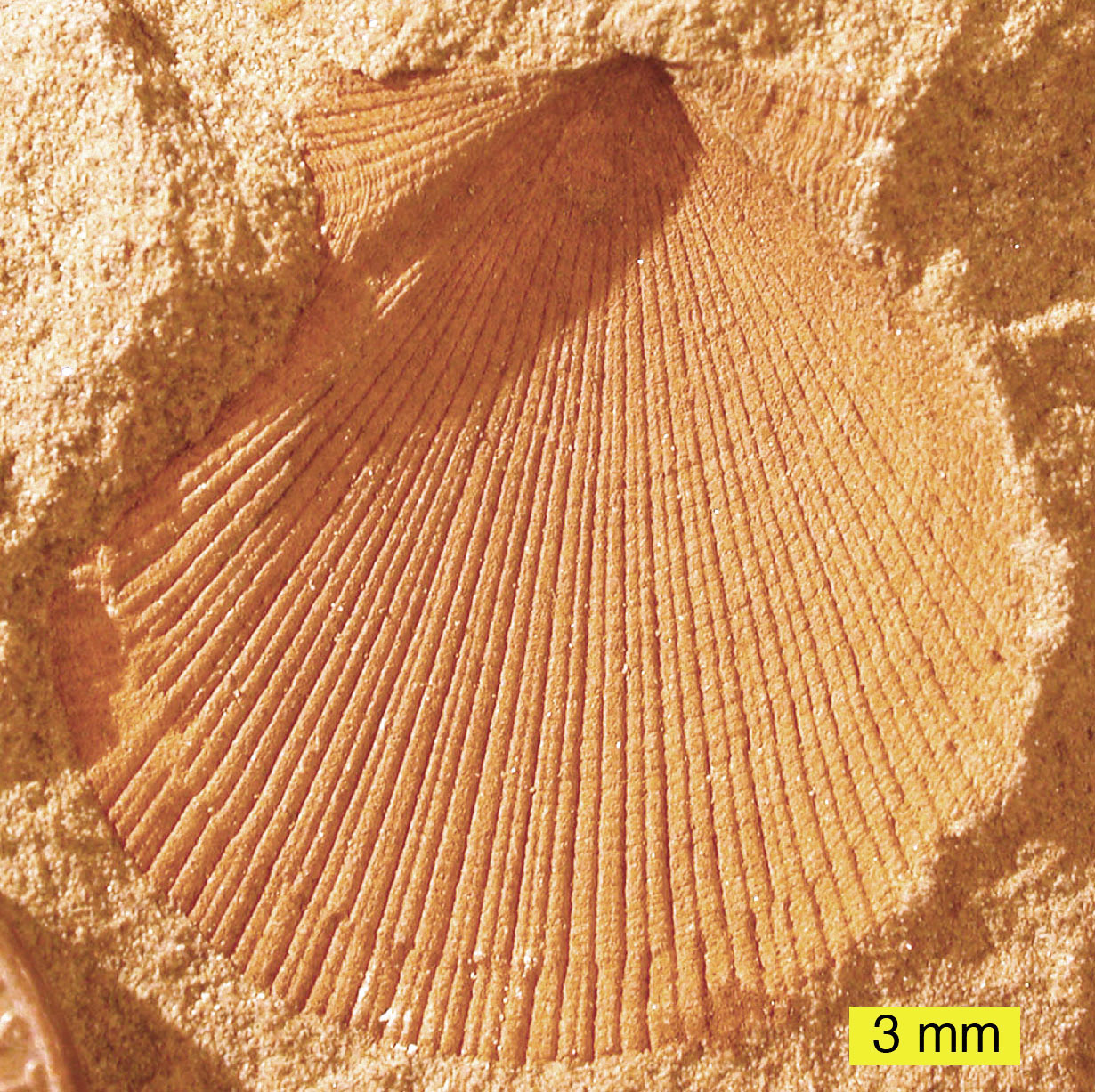
- Mold fossil of a shell of the Early Devonian-Late Triassic bivalve Aviculopecten
  †Aviculopecten
  - †Aviculopecten halensis
  - †Aviculopecten multilineatus
  - †Aviculopecten nodocosta – type locality for species
  - †Aviculopecten tomlinsoni – type locality for species
- †Avonia – tentative report
  - †Avonia snideri – type locality for species
  - †Avonia spinosa – type locality for species
- †Axinolobus

== B ==
- †Bactrites
  - †Bactrites smithianus
- †Bactrocrinites
  - †Bactrocrinites oklahomensis
- †Baeotherates – type locality for genus
  - †Baeotherates fortsillensis – type locality for species
- †Baiosoma
  - †Baiosoma batilia – type locality for species
- Bairdia
  - †Bairdia ardmorensis – type locality for species
  - †Bairdia billjohnsoni – type locality for species
  - †Bairdia croneisi – type locality for species
  - †Bairdia folgeri
  - †Bairdia forakerensis
  - †Bairdia multihilosa – type locality for species
- †Bairdiocypris
- †Bairdocypris – tentative report
  - †Bairdocypris transversus
- †Balticella
  - †Balticella deckeri
  - †Balticella elongata
- †Baltisphaeridium
  - †Baltisphaeridium accinctum
  - †Baltisphaeridium bystrentos
  - †Baltisphaeridium disparicanale
  - †Baltisphaeridium parvigranosum
  - †Baltisphaeridium trophirhapium
- †Barycrinus – tentative report
  - †Barycrinus herculeus – or unidentified related form
- †Bascomella
  - †Bascomella gigantea – or unidentified comparable form
- †Bathysiphon
- †Bathyurellus
  - †Bathyurellus arbucklensis
  - †Bathyurellus inflatus
- †Bathyurus
  - †Bathyurus superbus
- †Batostoma
  - †Batostoma chapparsi
  - †Batostoma chazyensis
  - †Batostoma cumingsi
  - †Batostoma ramosa
  - †Batostoma sheldonensis
  - †Batostoma winchelli
- †Beecheria
- †Beedeina
- †Bellazona
  - †Bellazona bella
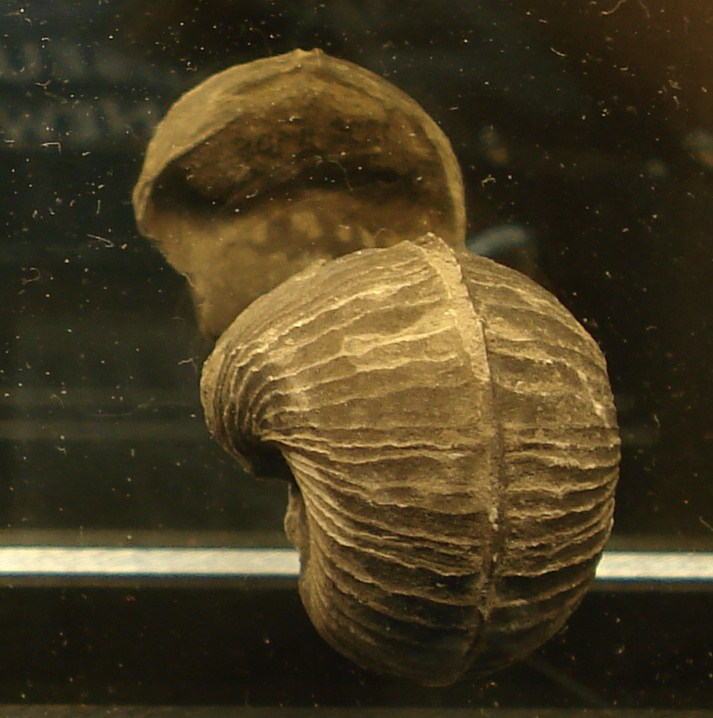
- Fossilized shell of the Silurian-Early Triassic mollusc Bellerophon
  †Bellerophon
  - †Bellerophon wewokanus
- †Bellimurina
  - †Bellimurina compressa
  - †Bellimurina subquadrata
- †Belodella
  - †Belodella silurica
- †Benthamaspis
  - †Benthamaspis mediacrista – or unidentified comparable form
  - †Benthamaspis onomeris
  - †Benthamaspis rhochmotis
- †Berestovia
- †Bicornella
  - †Bicornella tricornis
  - †Bicornella unicornis – type locality for species
- †Bigalea
- †Bilinguites
  - †Bilinguites eliasi – type locality for species
- †Bisatoceras – type locality for genus
  - †Bisatoceras primum – type locality for species
- †Bistomiacystis
- †Boesites
  - †Boesites girtyi
- †Bolbocephalus
  - †Bolbocephalus convexus – or unidentified comparable form
  - †Bolbocephalus jeffersonensis
  - †Bolbocephalus myktos
  - †Bolbocephalus stitti
- †Bollia
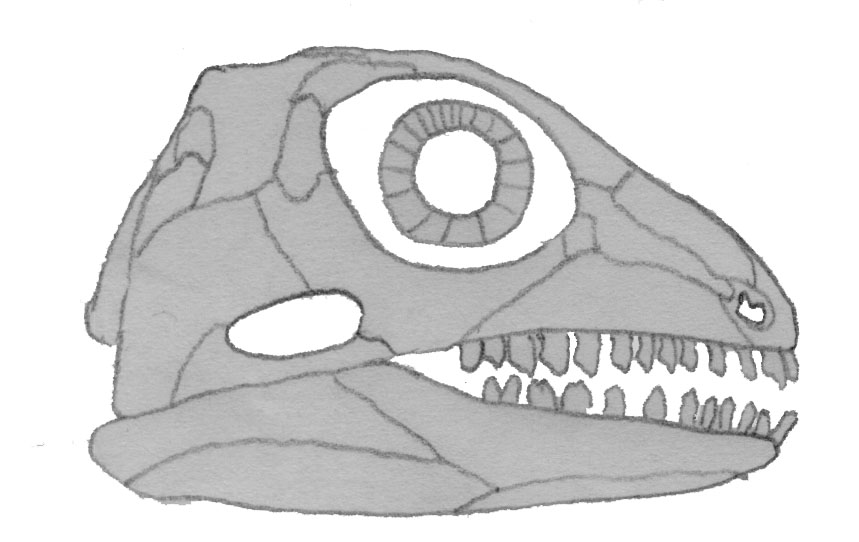
- Illustration of a fossilized skull of the Permian primitive reptile Bolosaurus
  †Bolosaurus
  - †Bolosaurus grandis – type locality for species
  - †Bolosaurus striatus
- †Bolterpeton – type locality for genus
  - †Bolterpeton carrolli – type locality for species
- †Borestus
  - †Borestus pagoda – type locality for species
- †Bothriocidaris
- †Botryocrinus
  - †Botryocrinus parcus
- †Botryopteris
  - †Botryopteris forensis
  - †Botryopteris mediatena
  - †Botryopteris tridentata
- †Brabeocrinus
  - †Brabeocrinus primus – type locality for species
- †Brachydegma – tentative report
  - †Brachydegma caelatum
- †Brachymimulus
  - †Brachymimulus americanus
- †Brachyprion
  - †Brachyprion arata
  - †Brachyprion attenuata
  - †Brachyprion gibber
  - †Brachyprion gibbera – type locality for species
- †Brachythyris
  - †Brachythyris chouteauensis
- †Bradyina
- †Bransonella – type locality for genus
  - †Bransonella tridentata – type locality for species
- †Breileenia
  - †Breileenia minnewankensis
- †Brevilamnulella
  - †Brevilamnulella thebesensis
- †Bromidechinus – type locality for genus
  - †Bromidechinus rimaporus – type locality for species
- †Bromidella
  - †Bromidella reticulata
- †Bromidocrinus
- †Bromidocystis
- †Buckhornia
  - †Buckhornia carteri
- †Bumastoides
  - †Bumastoides milleri – or unidentified comparable form
- †Buxtonia
  - †Buxtonia incurvatus
  - †Buxtonia semicircularis
  - †Buxtonia suttoni – type locality for species
- Bythocypris
  - †Bythocypris cylindrica
  - †Bythocypris kershavii
  - †Bythocypris spinosa
  - †Bythocypris tomlinsoni
- †Bythopora
  - †Bythopora subgracilis

== C ==
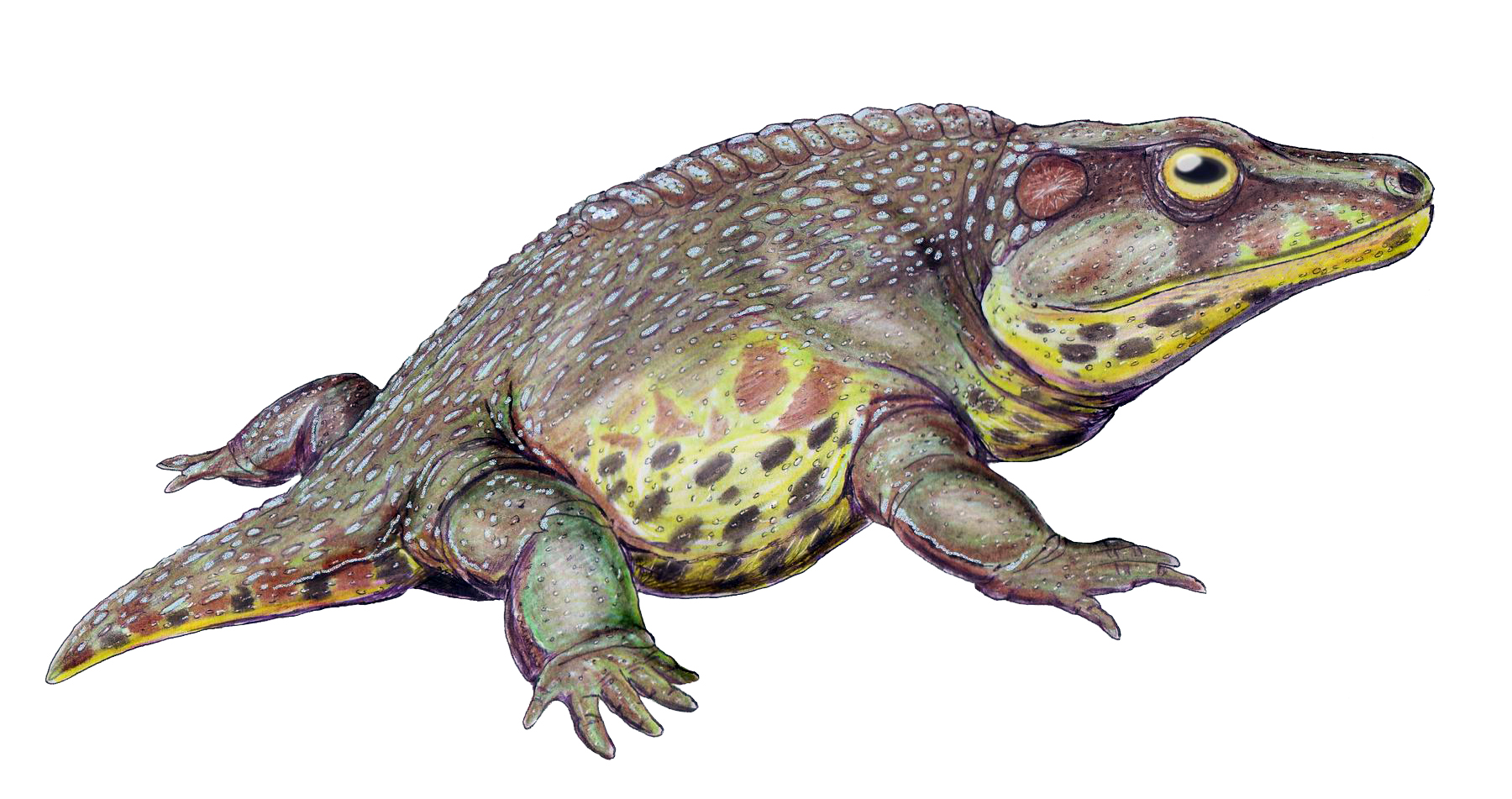
- Life restoration of the Permian amphibian Cacops
  †Cacops
  - †Cacops morrisi – type locality for species
  - †Cacops woehri – type locality for species
- †Cadiospora
  - †Cadiospora magna
- †Caenanoplia
  - †Caenanoplia burlingtonensis
- †Calamaspora
  - †Calamaspora breviradiata – or unidentified comparable form
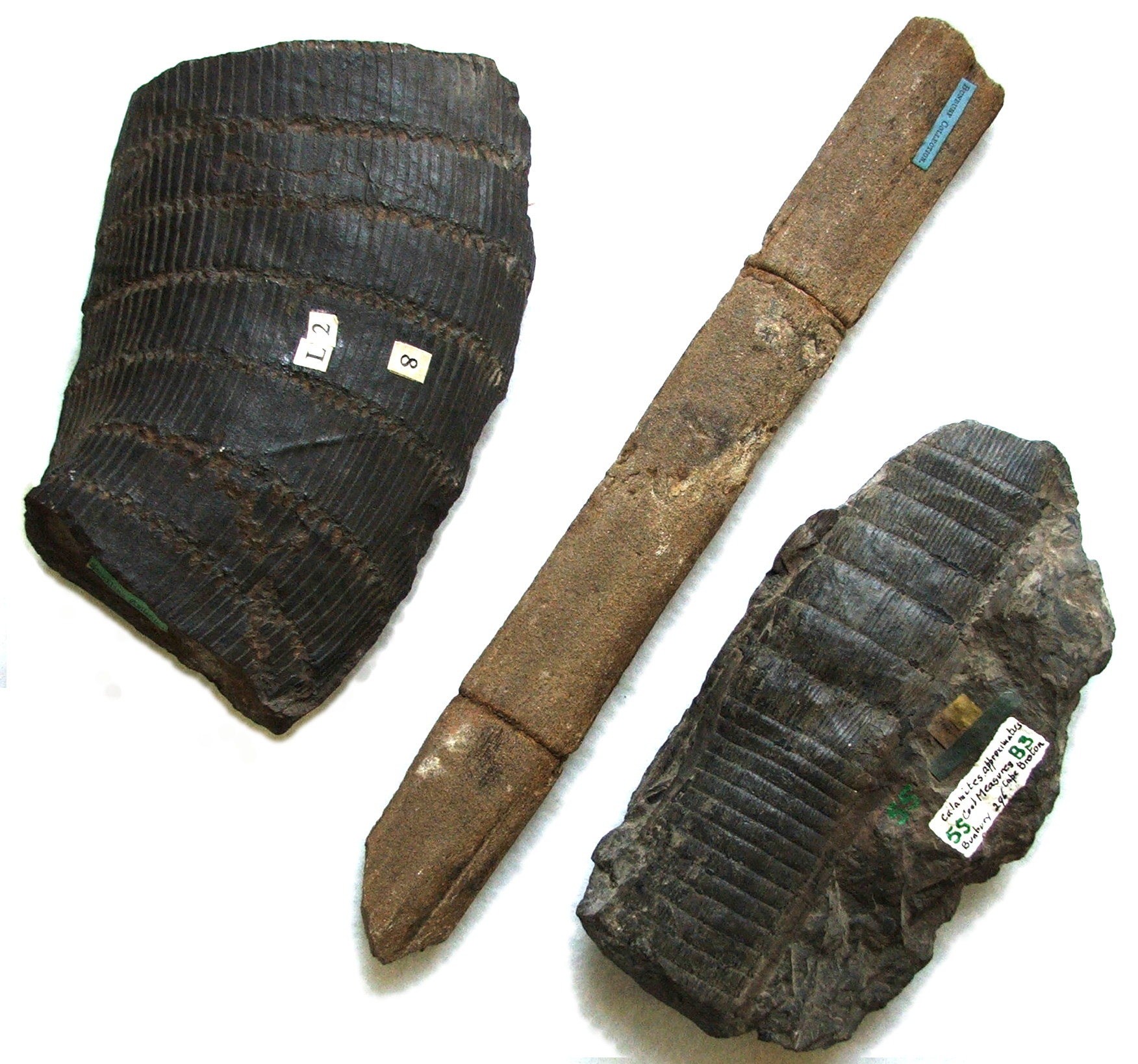
- Fossilized stems from the Carboniferous-Permian horsetail relative Calamites
  †Calamites
- †Calamospora
  - †Calamospora breviradiata
  - †Calamospora hartungiana
  - †Calamospora liquida
  - †Calamospora mutabilis
  - †Calamospora pedata
  - †Calamospora straminea
- †Calathium
- †Calceocrinus
  - †Calceocrinus humilis
- †Callipteris
- †Callistophyton
  - †Callistophyton boyssetii
- †Calohymen – type locality for genus
  - †Calohymen permianus – type locality for species
- †Calycocrinus
  - †Calycocrinus furnishi – type locality for species
  - †Calycocrinus symmetricus – type locality for species
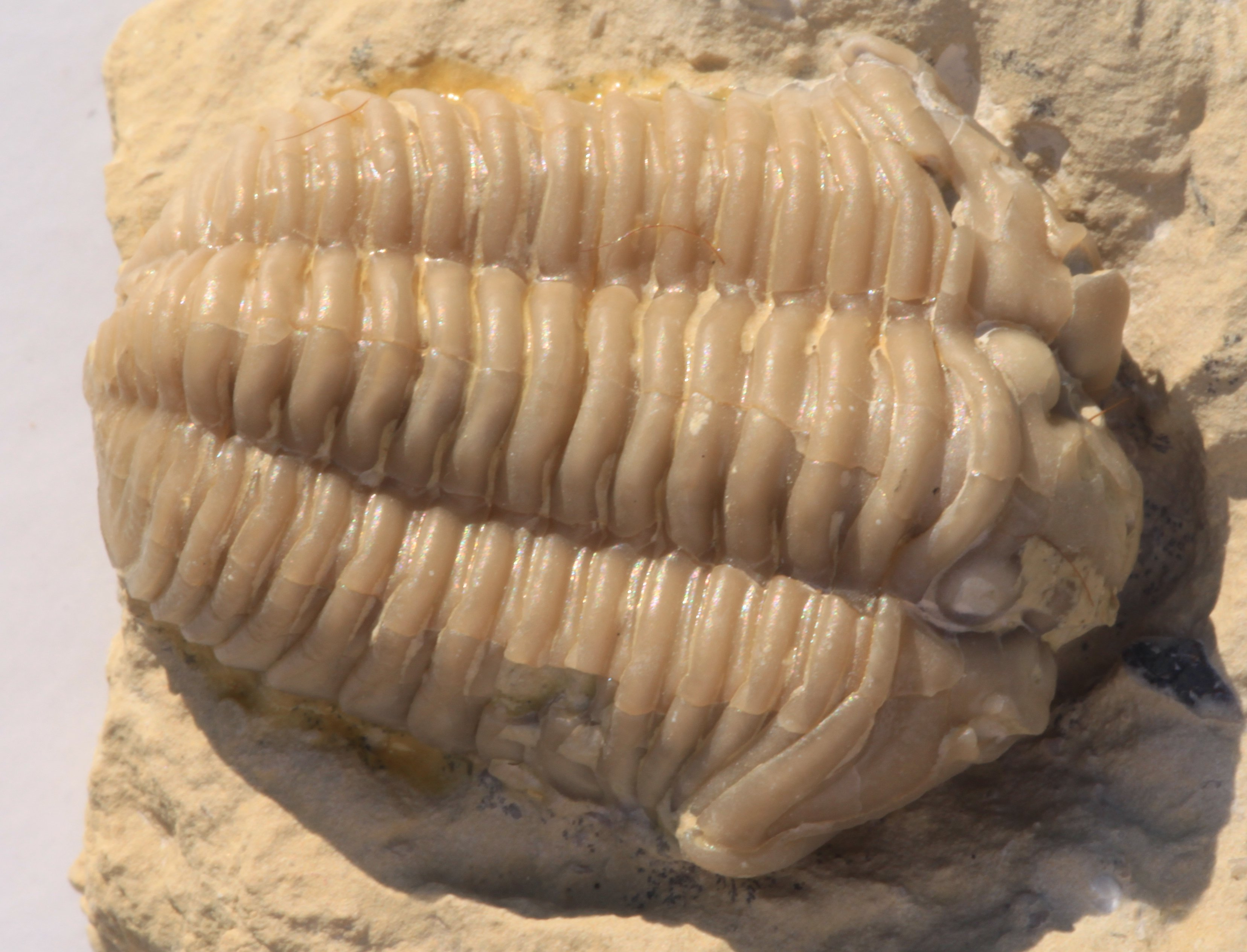
- Fossil of the Early Ordovician-Early Devonian trilobite Calymene
  †Calymene
  - †Calymene clavicula
- †Calyptaulax
  - †Calyptaulax annulata
- †Camarophorella
- †Camarotoechia
  - †Camarotoechia altisulcata
  - †Camarotoechia carmelensis
  - †Camarotoechia filistriata
  - †Camarotoechia haraganensis
  - †Camarotoechia oklahomensis
- † Camerate
- †Camerella
  - †Camerella anteroplicata
  - †Camerella oklahomensis
- †Camorphoria
- †Campbelloceras
- †Cancelloceras
  - †Cancelloceras huntsvillense – type locality for species
- †Cancrinella
  - †Cancrinella boonensis
- †Caneyella
- †Capnophyllum
- †Captorhinikos
  - †Captorhinikos chozaensis
  - †Captorhinikos parvus – type locality for species
  - †Captorhinikos valensis
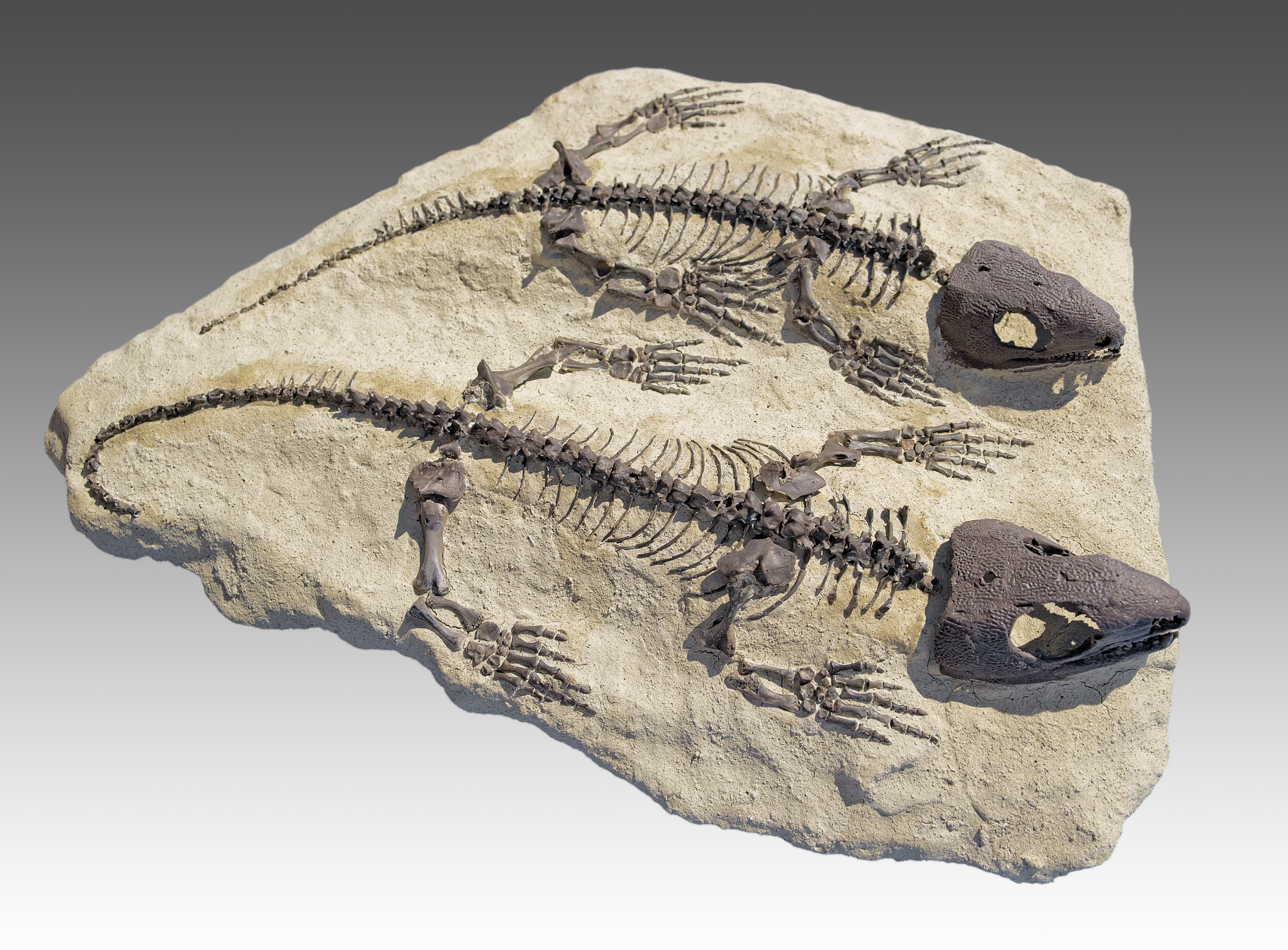
- Fossilized skeletons of the Permian reptile Captorhinus
  †Captorhinus
  - †Captorhinus aguti
  - †Captorhinus kierani – type locality for species
  - †Captorhinus laticeps – type locality for species
  - †Captorhinus magnus – type locality for species
- †Carabocrinus
  - †Carabocrinus loeblichi
  - †Carabocrinus logani
  - †Carabocrinus treadwelli
  - †Carabocrinus tumidus
  - †Carabocrinus vancortlandi – or unidentified comparable form
- †Carbonocoryphe
  - †Carbonocoryphe planucauda
- †Carboprimitia
  - †Carboprimitia rotunda – or unidentified comparable form
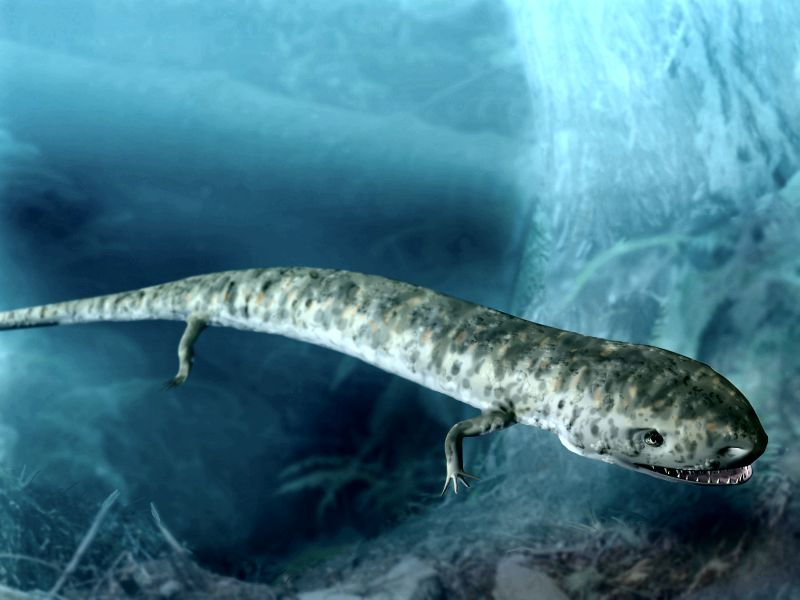
- Life restoration of the Permian amphibian Cardiocephalus
  †Cardiocephalus
  - †Cardiocephalus peabodyi – type locality for species
  - †Cardiocephalus sternbergi – or unidentified comparable form
- †Cardiodella
  - †Cardiodella abbreviatus
  - †Cardiodella arcuatus
  - †Cardiodella densus
  - †Cardiodella robustus
- †Carolinites
  - †Carolinites sibiricus
- †Caryocaris – tentative report
- †Caryocrinites
- †Cavellina
  - †Cavellina lata
  - †Cavellina subovata
- †Cavernula
  - †Cavernula coccidia
  - †Cavernula pediculata
- †Centrotarphyceras
  - †Centrotarphyceras powersi
- †Ceramopora
  - †Ceramopora unapensis
- †Ceramoporella
  - †Ceramoporella ingenua
- †Ceratiocaris
- †Ceratocephala
  - †Ceratocephala graffhami
- †Ceratonurus
- †Ceratopea
- †Ceraurinella
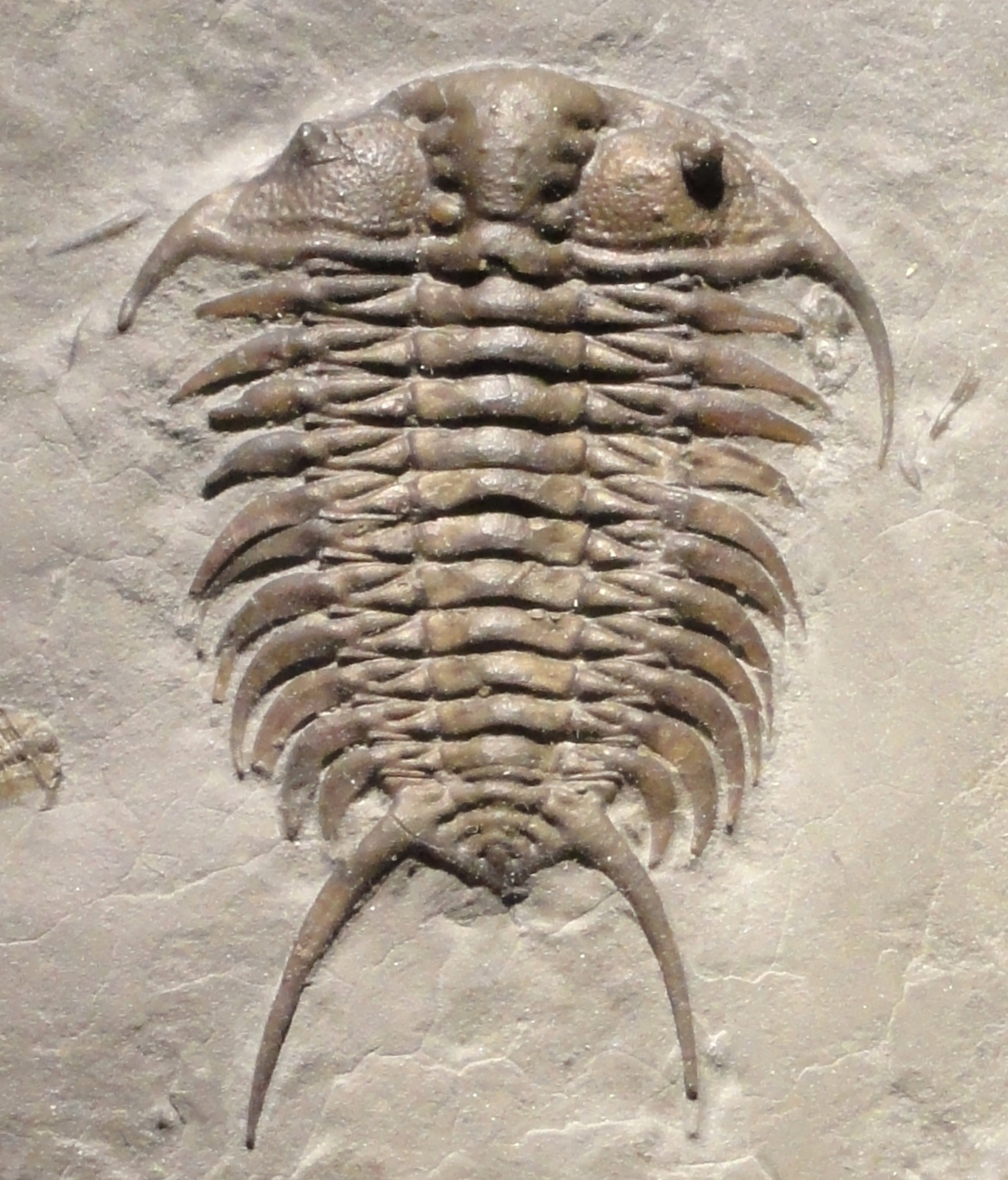
- Fossil of the Middle-Late Ordovician trilobite Ceraurus
  †Ceraurus
  - †Ceraurus ruidus
- †Cerithioides – tentative report
  - †Cerithioides gleanensis
- †Chaenocardia
  - †Chaenocardia ovata
- †Chaetetes
  - †Chaetetes milleporaceus – or unidentified comparable form
- †Chaloneria
- †Champlainopora
  - †Champlainopora chazyensis
- †Chapmania
  - †Chapmania carterensis
  - †Chapmania oklahomensis
  - †Chapmania taylori
- †Chaulistomella
  - †Chaulistomella crassa
  - †Chaulistomella magna
  - †Chaulistomella mira
  - †Chaulistomella mundula
  - †Chaulistomella nitens
  - †Chaulistomella obesa
- †Cheirocrinus
- †Cheirocystis
  - †Cheirocystis ardmorensis
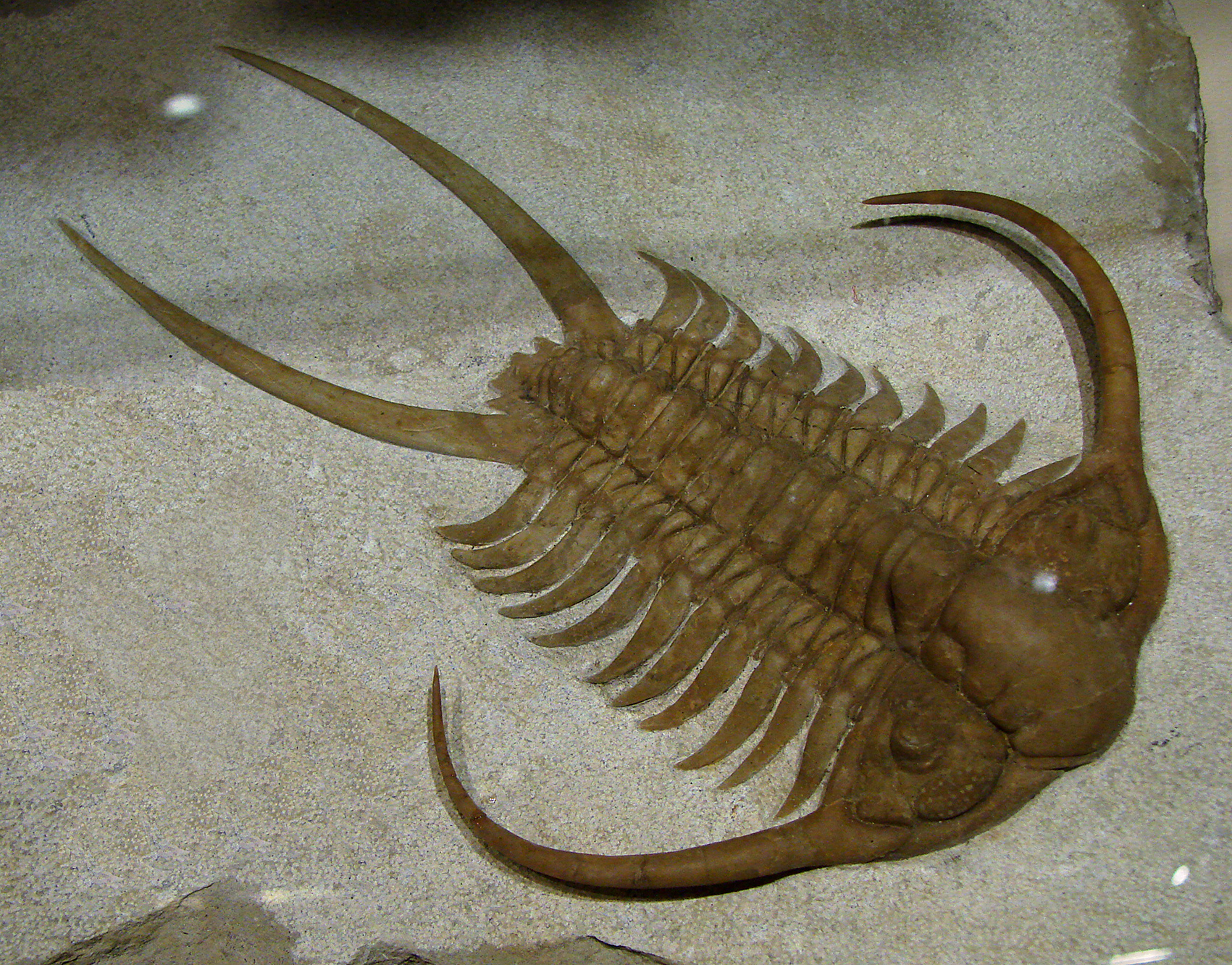
- Fossil of the Cambrian-Middle Devonian trilobite Cheirurus
  †Cheirurus
  - †Cheirurus infensus
  - †Cheirurus phollikodes – type locality for species
- †Chilotrypa
  - †Chilotrypa distans – type locality for species
- †Chlidochirus
- †Choctawites
  - †Choctawites choctawensis
- †Chonetes
  - †Chonetes decipiens
  - †Chonetes euampygus
  - †Chonetes kingi – type locality for species
  - †Chonetes mesoloba
- †Chonetinella
  - †Chonetinella flemingi – or unidentified comparable form
- †Cibecuia
  - †Cibecuia gouldii
- †Cibolocrinus
  - †Cibolocrinus bellus – type locality for species
  - †Cibolocrinus circulus – type locality for species
  - †Cibolocrinus spinosus – type locality for species
  - †Cibolocrinus tumidus
- †Cirratriradites
  - †Cirratriradites annulatus
  - †Cirratriradites annuliformis
  - †Cirratriradites maculatus
  - †Cirratriradites saturnii
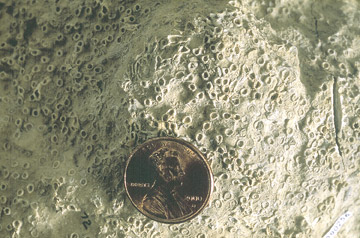
- Fossil of the Carboniferous tabulate coral Cladochonus
  †Cladochonus
- †Claritacarpus – type locality for genus
  - †Claritacarpus smithi – type locality for species
- †Clarkeolepis – type locality for genus
  - †Clarkeolepis clarkei – type locality for species
  - †Clarkeolepis elegans – type locality for species
- †Clathrocrinus
  - †Clathrocrinus grileyi – type locality for species
- †Clavasporites – type locality for genus
  - †Clavasporites irregularis – type locality for species
- †Clavatasporites
  - †Clavatasporites irregularis
- †Cleiocrinus
  - †Cleiocrinus bromidensis – type locality for species
  - †Cleiocrinus regius
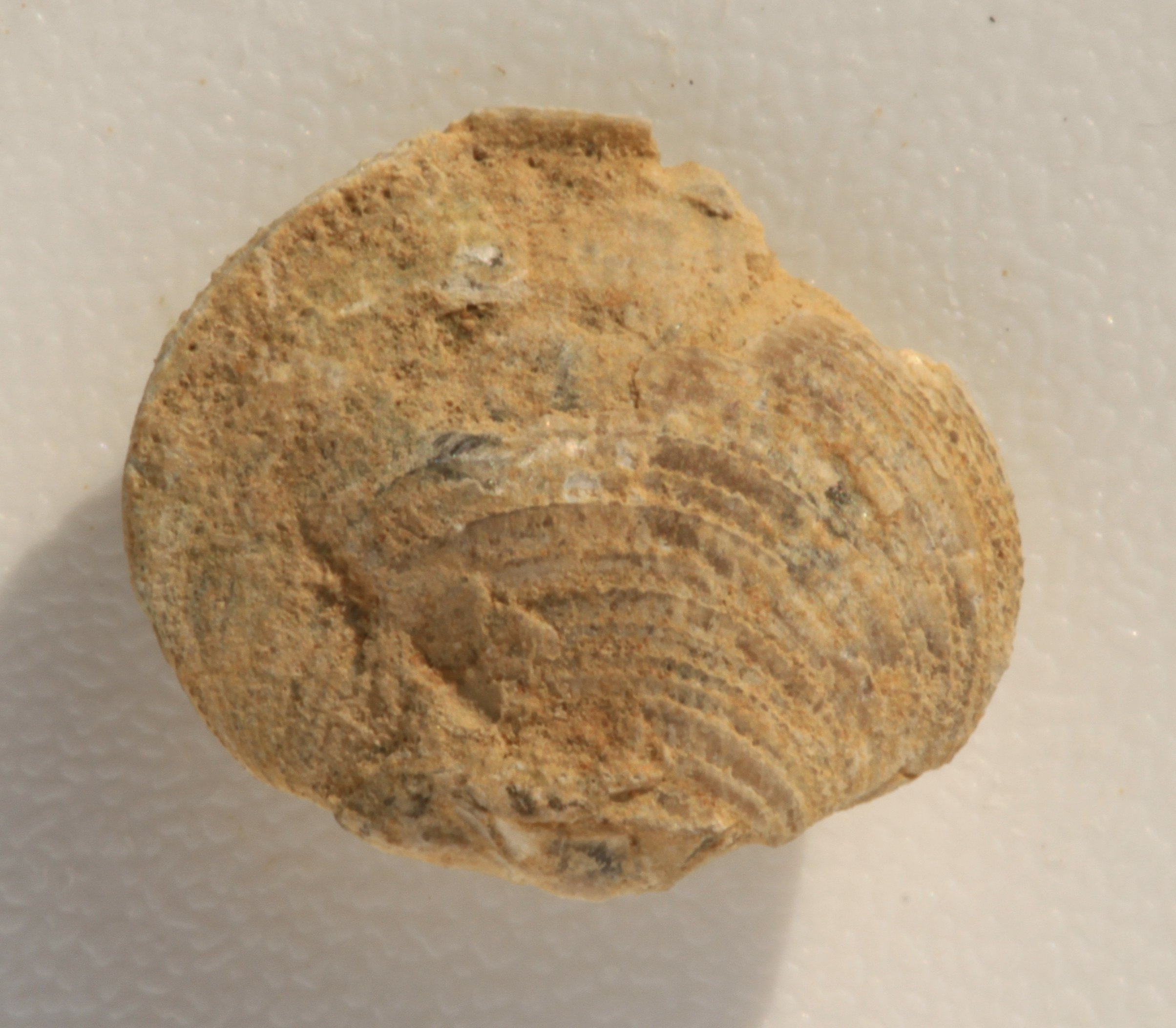
- Fossilized shell of the Middle Devonian-Permian brachiopod Cleiothyridina
  †Cleiothyridina
  - †Cleiothyridina glenparkensis – or unidentified comparable form
  - †Cleiothyridina orbicularis
- †Cleithronetrum
  - †Cleithronetrum cancellatum
- †Cleithyridina
  - †Cleithyridina orbicularis
- †Clepsydrops
- †Climacammina
- Cliona
  - †Cliona fenestralis – type locality for species
  - †Cliona paleodendrica – type locality for species
  - †Cliona stellata – type locality for species
- †Clionolithes
  - †Clionolithes radicans – or unidentified comparable form
- †Coelochilina
  - †Coelochilina alata
- †Coelospira
  - †Coelospira concava
  - †Coelospira saffordi
  - †Coelospira virginia
- †Colaptomena
  - †Colaptomena bella
- †Coledium
  - †Coledium simulans
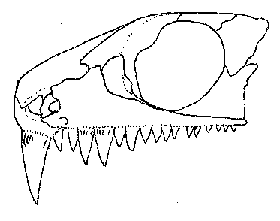
- Illustration of a fossilized cranium of the Permian primitive reptile Colobomycter
  †Colobomycter – type locality for genus
  - †Colobomycter pholeter – type locality for species
  - †Colobomycter vaughni – type locality for species
- †Colpodecrinus
- †Complexisporites
  - †Complexisporites polymorphus
- †Composita
  - †Composita mexicana
  - †Composita rotunda
  - †Composita subcircularis
  - †Composita subtilita
  - †Composita wasatchensis
- Concavisporites
- †Concavissimisporites
- †Condracypris
  - †Condracypris binoda
  - †Condracypris coalensis – type locality for species
  - †Condracypris parallela
  - †Condracypris simplex
- †Condranema
  - †Condranema magna – or unidentified comparable form
- †Conularia
  - †Conularia crustula – or unidentified comparable form
- †Coolinia
  - †Coolinia reedsi
- †Cordania
  - †Cordania falcata
  - †Cordania wessmani
- †Cordylodus
- †Cornigella
  - †Cornigella pushmatahensis – type locality for species
- †Cornulites
  - †Cornulites inelegans
- Cornuspira
  - †Cornuspira semiconstrictus
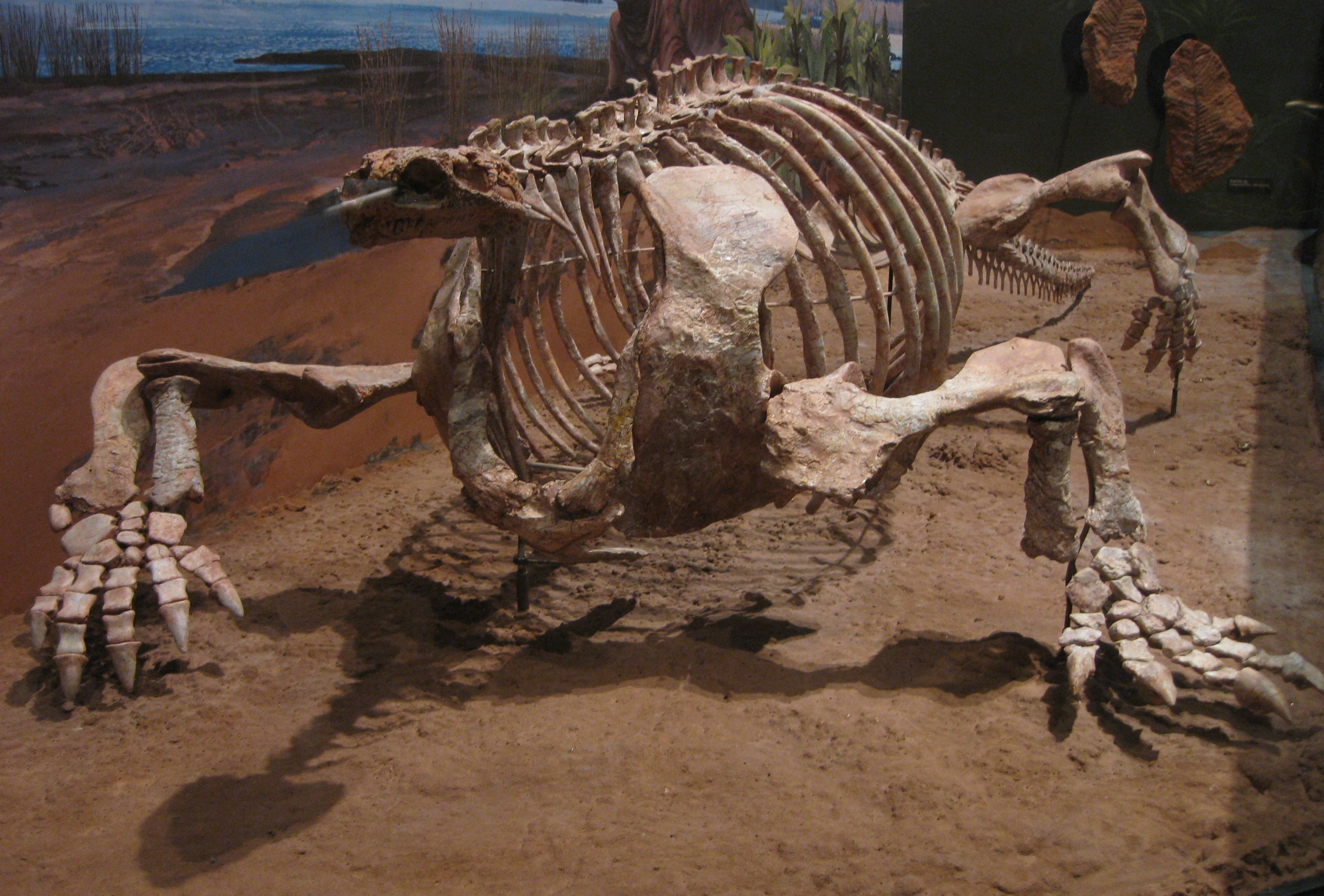
- Mounted fossilized skeleton of the Permian synapsid (mammal precursor) Cotylorhynchus
  †Cotylorhynchus – type locality for genus
  - †Cotylorhynchus bransoni – type locality for species
  - †Cotylorhynchus romeri – type locality for species
- †Cranaena
  - †Cranaena globosa
  - †Cranaena salinensis – type locality for species
- Crania
  - †Crania minuta – type locality for species
- †Craniops
  - †Craniops tenuis
- †Crassispora
  - †Crassispora kosankei
- †Cravenoceras
- †Cremacrinus
- †Cricotillus
  - †Cricotillus brachydens
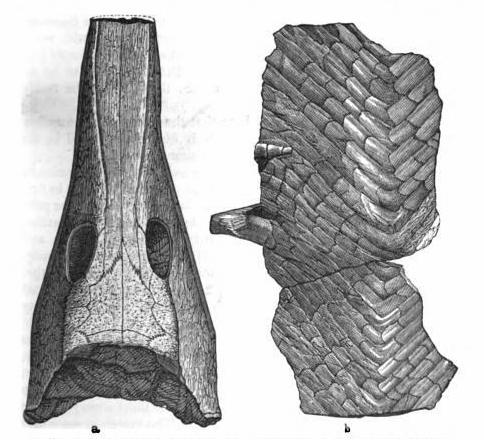
- Illustration of a fossilized skull and ventral scutes of the Carboniferous-Permian reptile relative Cricotus. Edward Drinker Cope (1884).
  †Cricotus
  - †Cricotus crassidiscus
- †Crinerocrinus
- †Crinisarina
  - †Crinisarina prouti
- †Crinoedischia
  - †Crinoedischia noblensis – type locality for species
- †Cromyocrinus
  - †Cromyocrinus grandis
- †Crossotelos – type locality for genus
  - †Crossotelos annulatus – type locality for species
- †Crurithyris
  - †Crurithyris planoconvexa
- †Cruruthyris
  - †Cruruthyris planoconvexa
- †Crustaesporites
  - †Crustaesporites globulus – tentative report
- †Cryptophyllus
  - †Cryptophyllus gibbosum
  - †Cryptophyllus nuculopsis
  - †Cryptophyllus simpsoni
- †Cryptothyrella – tentative report
  - †Cryptothyrella ovoides
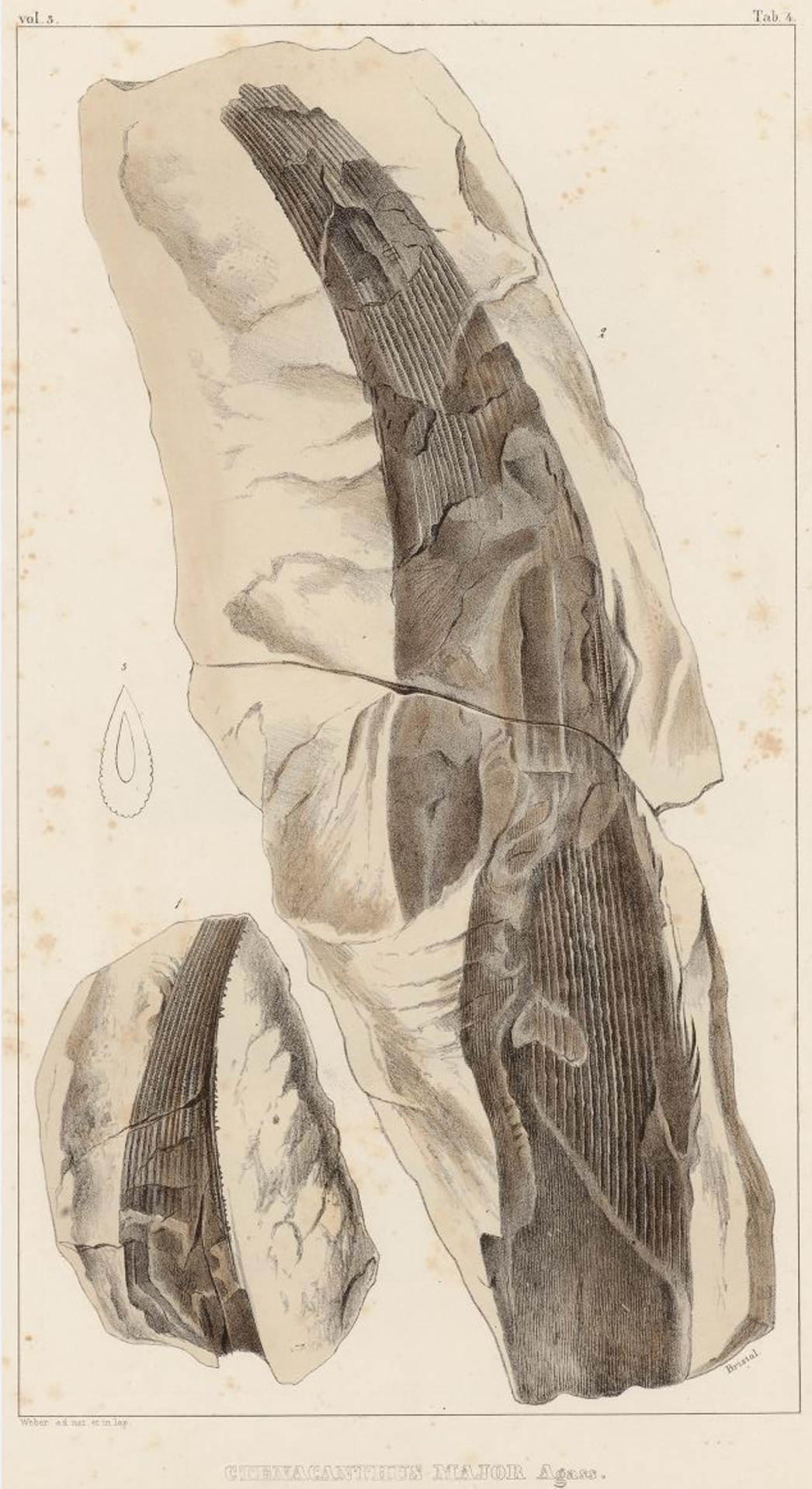
- Fossil of the Carboniferous shark Ctenacanthus
  †Ctenacanthus – report made of unidentified related form or using admittedly obsolete nomenclature
- †Ctenobolbina
  - †Ctenobolbina abrupta
  - †Ctenobolbina bispinata
  - †Ctenobolbina cancellata
  - †Ctenobolbina inflata
  - †Ctenobolbina parva
  - †Ctenobolbina percarinata
  - †Ctenobolbina varicata
- †Cullisonia
  - †Cullisonia producta
- †Curtognathus
  - †Curtognathus cordiformis
  - †Curtognathus coronata
  - †Curtognathus limitaris
- †Cyathocystis
  - †Cyathocystis oklahomae
- †Cybeloides
- †Cybelopsis
- †Cycadopites
- †Cyclites
  - †Cyclites depressus – type locality for species
- †Cyclobathmus
  - †Cyclobathmus haworthi – type locality for species
- †Cycloceras
  - †Cycloceras meeki – type locality for species
  - †Cycloceras randolphensis
- †Cyclocystoides
- †Cyclogranisporites
  - †Cyclogranisporites aureus
  - †Cyclogranisporites leopoldi
  - †Cyclogranisporites microgranus
  - †Cyclogranisporites minutus
  - †Cyclogranisporites obliquus
  - †Cyclogranisporites orbicularis
- †Cyclonema
- †Cycloplectoceras
  - †Cycloplectoceras miseri
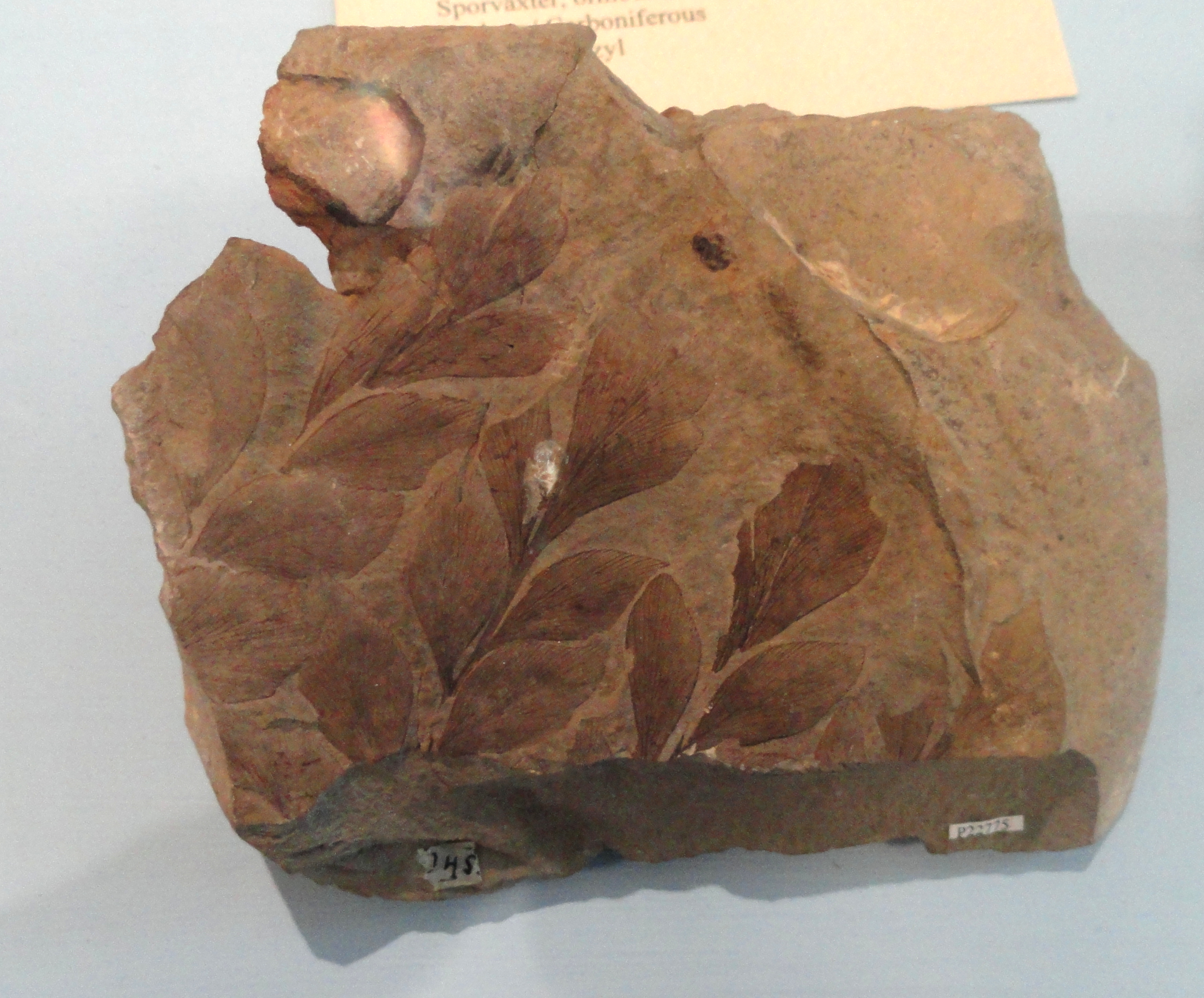
- Fossilized foliage from the Carboniferous seed fern Cyclopteris
  †Cyclopteris
- †Cyclopuncta – type locality for genus
  - †Cyclopuncta girtyi – type locality for species
- †Cyclospira
  - †Cyclospira parva
- †Cyclozyga
  - †Cyclozyga neotenica – type locality for species
- †Cymatorhiza – type locality for genus
  - †Cymatorhiza kittsi – type locality for species
- †Cymatospira
  - †Cymatospira montfortianus
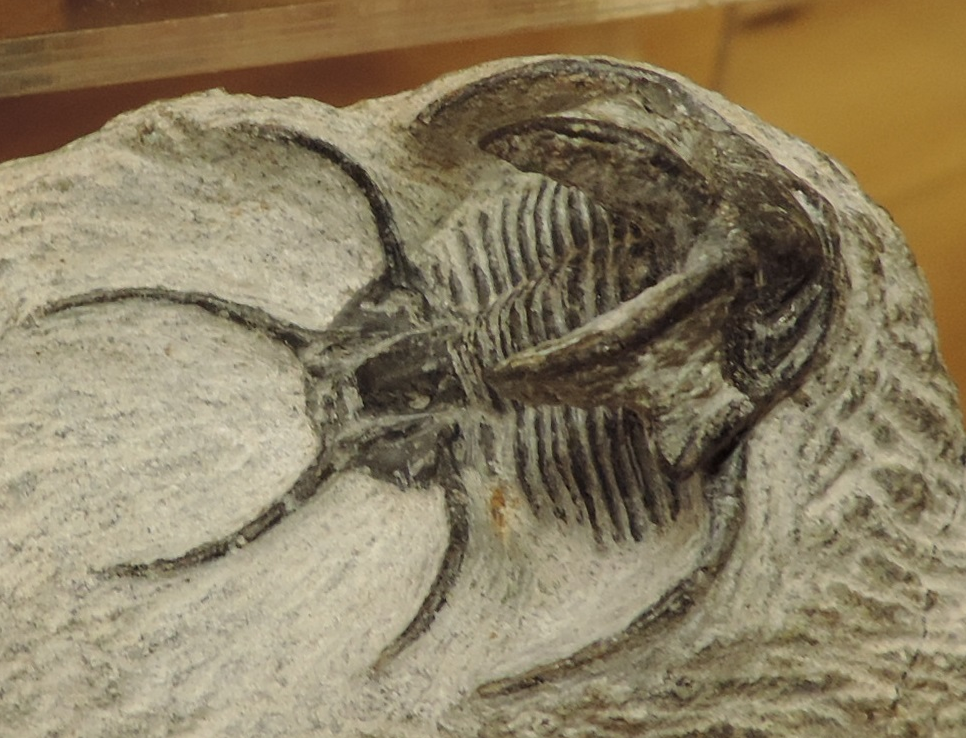
- Fossil of the Late Ordovician-Late Devonian trilobite Cyphaspis
  †Cyphaspis
  - †Cyphaspis carrolli
- †Cyphoneurodes
  - †Cyphoneurodes patriciae – type locality for species
- †Cypricardella – tentative report
  - †Cypricardella enigmatica – type locality for species
- †Cyrtina
  - †Cyrtina dalmani
- †Cyrtograptus
- †Cyrtorizoceras
- †Cystiphyllum
- †Cystodictya
  - †Cystodictya elegans – type locality for species

== D ==
- †Dactylogonia
  - †Dactylogonia sculpturata
  - †Dactylogonia subaequicostellata
- †Dalejina
  - †Dalejina henryhousensis
  - †Dalejina subtriangularis
- †Dalmanella
  - †Dalmanella edgewoodensis
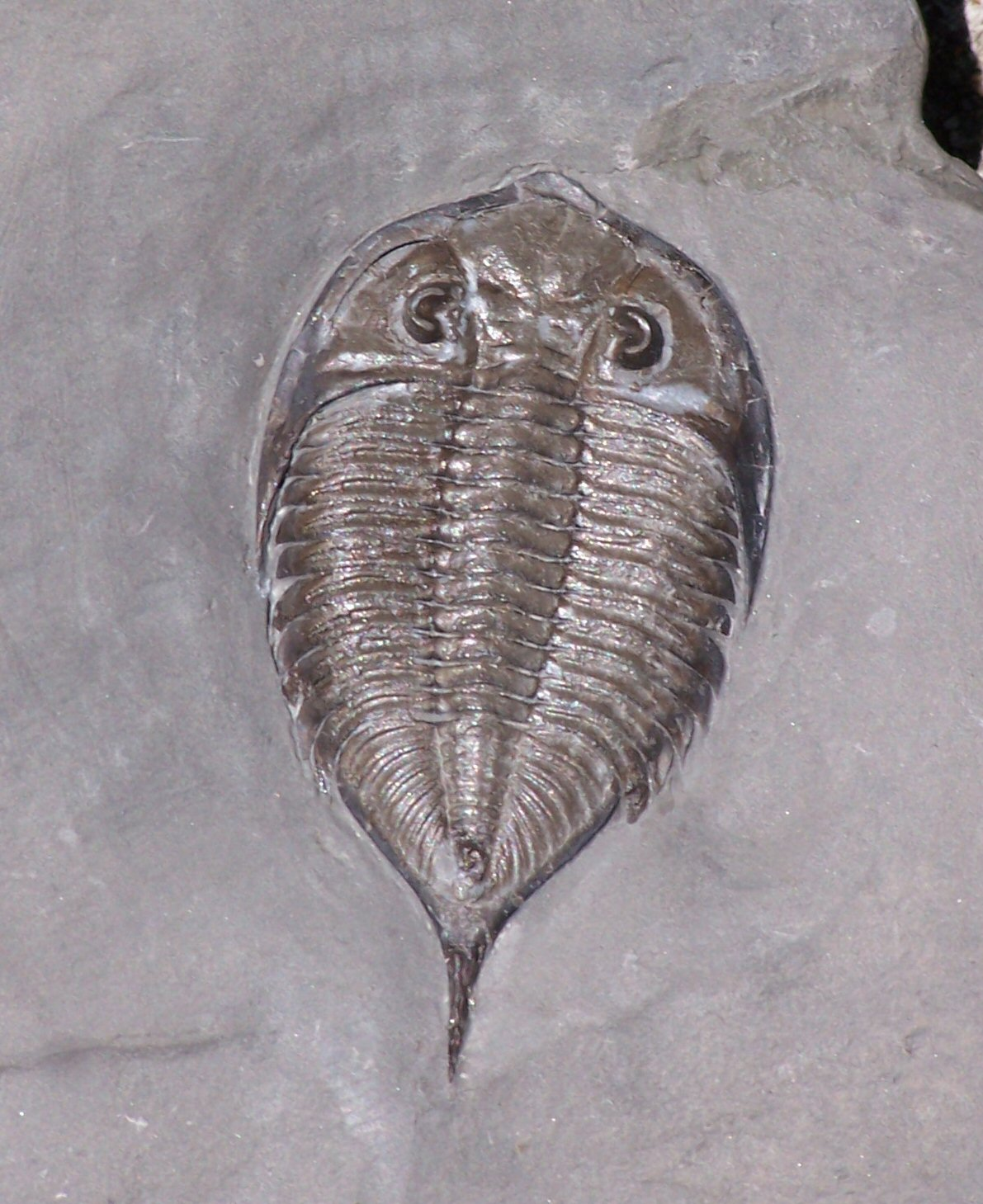
- Fossil of the Late Ordovician-Middle Devonian trilobite Dalmanites
  †Dalmanites
  - †Dalmanites ptyktorhion
  - †Dalmanites rutellum
- †Dapsilodus
  - †Dapsilodus obliquicostatus
  - †Dapsilodus praecipuus
  - †Dapsilodus sparsus
- †Decoriconus
  - †Decoriconus fragilis
- †Decoroproetus
  - †Decoroproetus anaglyptus
  - †Decoroproetus corycoeus
- †Dekayella
  - †Dekayella praenuntia
- †Delocrinus
  - †Delocrinus densus
  - †Delocrinus hemisphericus
  - †Delocrinus pentanodus – type locality for species
- †Deloia
  - †Deloia sulcata
- †Delopsocus
  - †Delopsocus elongatus
- †Delopterum
  - †Delopterum latum
  - †Delopterum minutum
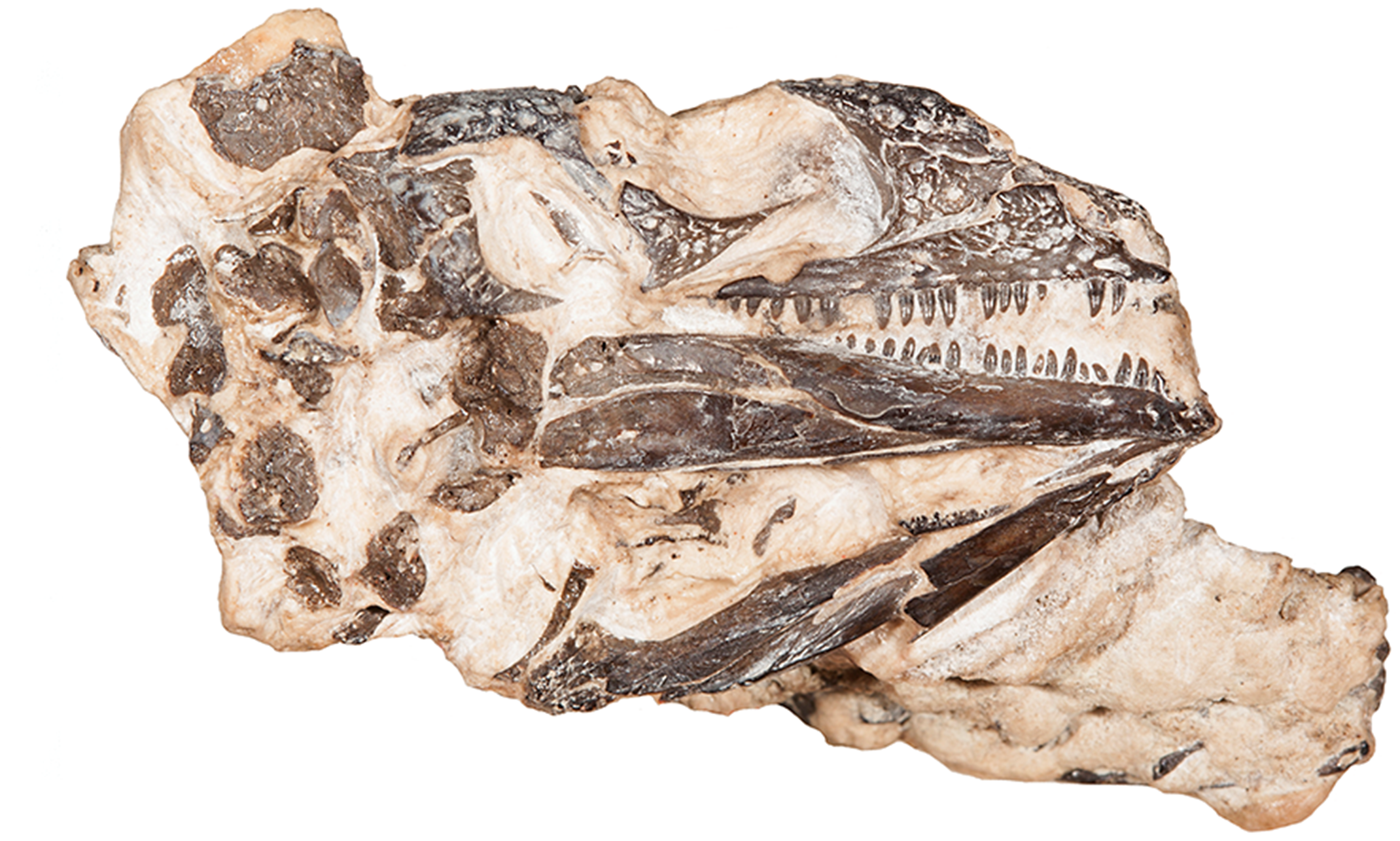
- Interpretive diagrams and fossils of a skull of the Permian primitive reptile Delorhynchus
  †Delorhynchus – type locality for genus
  - †Delorhynchus cifellii – type locality for species
  - †Delorhynchus priscus – type locality for species
- †Delotaxis
- †Delthyris
  - †Delthyris kozlowskii
- †Deltoidospora
  - †Deltoidospora adnata
  - †Deltoidospora grandis
  - †Deltoidospora levis
  - †Deltoidospora priddyi
  - †Deltoidospora sphaerotriangula
  - †Deltoidospora subadnatoides
- †Dendrocrinus
  - †Dendrocrinus latibranchiatus – or unidentified comparable form
  - †Dendrocrinus rusticus
- †Densosporites
  - †Densosporites sphaerotriangularis
- †Derbyia
  - †Derbyia crassa – or unidentified comparable form
- †Derbyoides – or unidentified related form
- †Desmoinesia
  - †Desmoinesia muricatina
- †Desmorthis
- †Diabolocrinus
- †Diacalymene
  - †Diacalymene clavicula
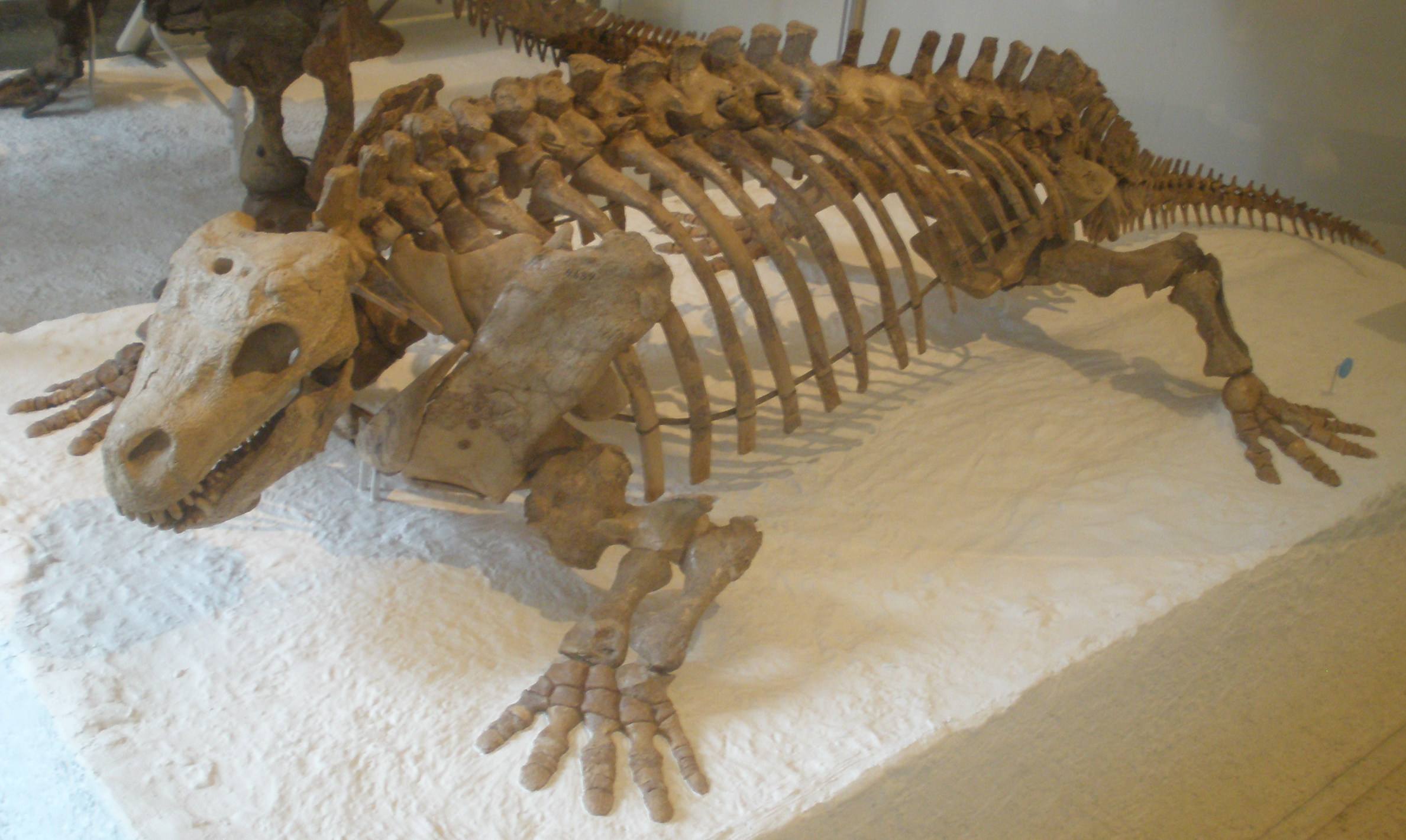
- Fossilized skeleton of the Permian reptile relative Diadectes
  †Diadectes
  - †Diadectes zenos
- †Dianulites
  - †Dianulites fastigiatus
  - †Dianulites petropolitana
- †Diaphoroceras
- †Diaphorodendron
  - †Diaphorodendron dicentricum
  - †Diaphorodendron scleroticum
- †Diaphragmus
  - †Diaphragmus fasciculatus
- †Dibunophyllum
  - †Dibunophyllum hansoni – type locality for species
- †Dicamaropsis
  - †Dicamaropsis parva
- †Dicellograptus
  - †Dicellograptus gurleyi
  - †Dicellograptus mensurans
- †Diceromyonia
  - †Diceromyonia tersa – or unidentified comparable form
- †Dichentomum
  - †Dichentomum tinctum
- †Dichognathus
  - †Dichognathus extensa
  - †Dichognathus typica
- †Dicoelosia
  - †Dicoelosia oklahomenesis – type locality for species
  - †Dicoelosia oklahomensis
  - †Dicoelosia varica
- †Dicranella
  - †Dicranella fragilis
  - †Dicranella macrocarinata
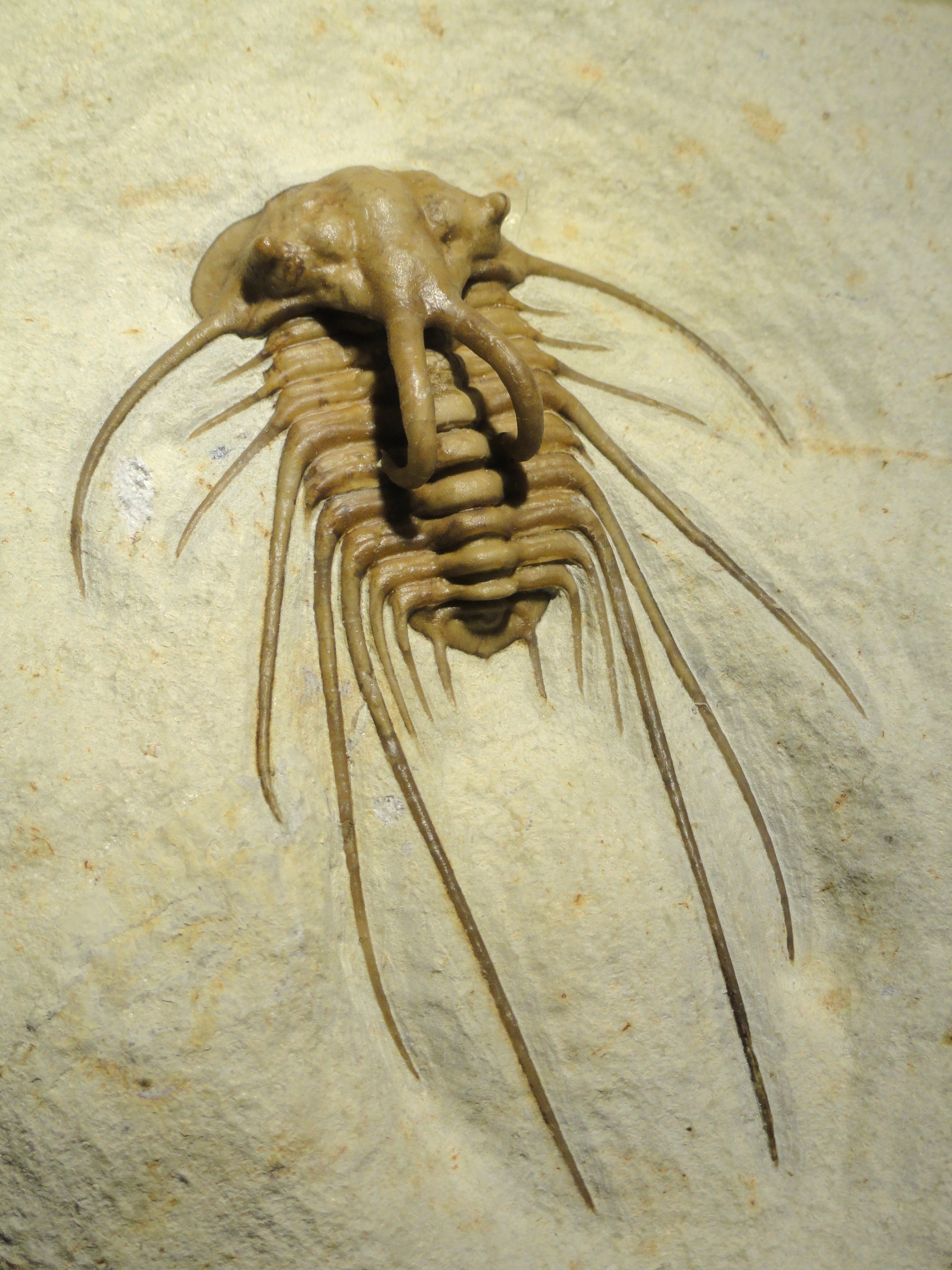
- Dicranurus
  †Dicranurus
  - †Dicranurus elegantus
  - †Dicranurus hamatus
- †Dicromyocrinus
  - †Dicromyocrinus medius – type locality for species
  - †Dicromyocrinus optimus
  - †Dicromyocrinus subaplatus – type locality for species
- †Dictybolos – type locality for genus
  - †Dictybolos tener – type locality for species
- †Dictyoclostus
  - †Dictyoclostus ingrata – or unidentified related form
  - †Dictyoclostus mesialis
- †Dictyonema
  - †Dictyonema francesiae
  - †Dictyonema rockcrossingensis
- †Dictyospongia
- †Dielasma
  - †Dielasma oklahomensis – type locality for species
- †Dierespongia – type locality for genus
  - †Dierespongia palla – type locality for species
- †Dimeropygiella
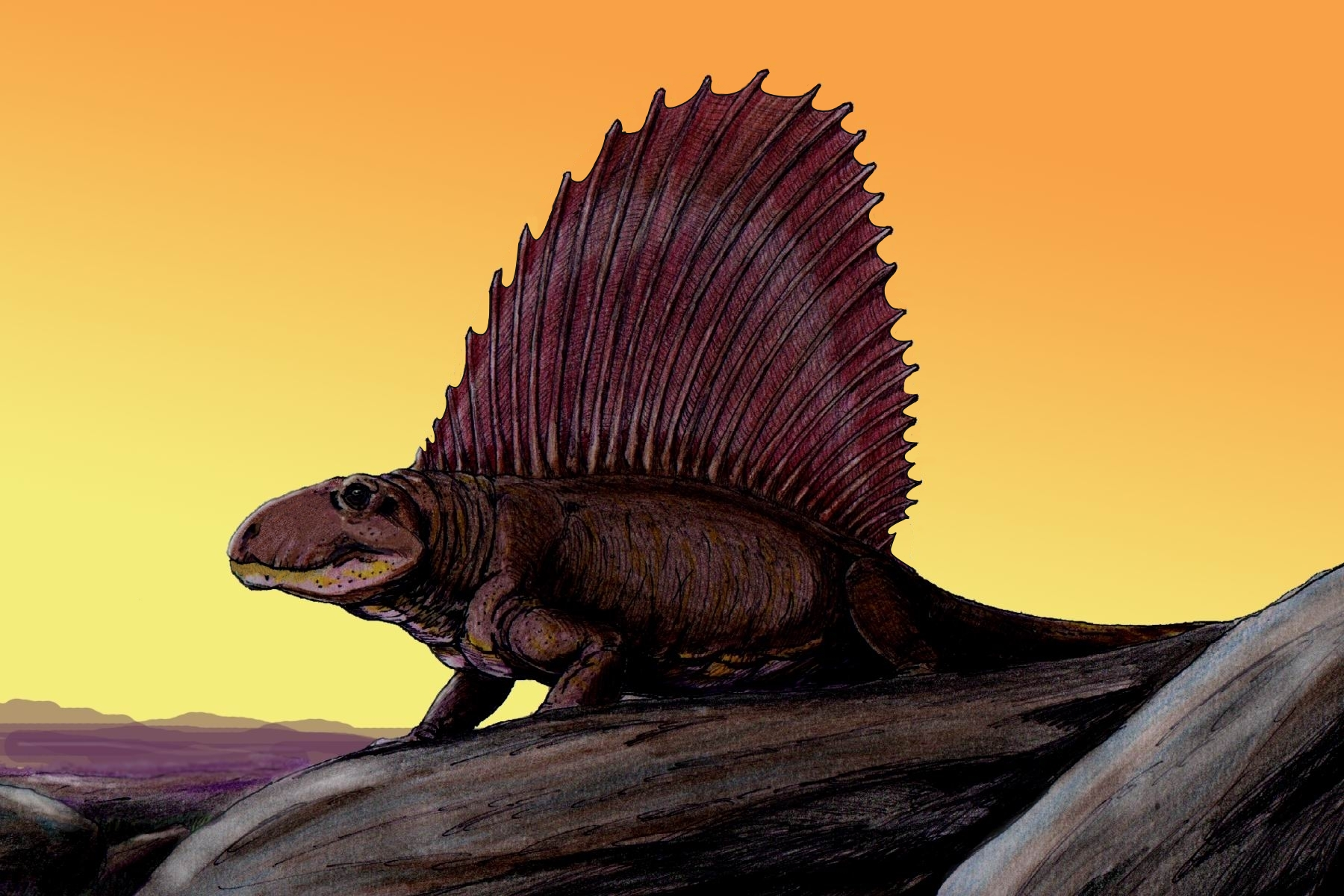
- Life restoration of the Permian synapsid (mammal precursor) Dimetrodon
  †Dimetrodon
  - †Dimetrodon dollovianus
  - †Dimetrodon limbatus – or unidentified comparable form
  - †Dimetrodon loomisi
  - †Dimetrodon macrospondylus
- †Diphuicrinus
  - †Diphuicrinus croneisi
  - †Diphuicrinus dovelyensis
  - †Diphuicrinus faustus – type locality for species
  - †Diphuicrinus mammifer – type locality for species
  - †Diphuicrinus pentanodus – type locality for species
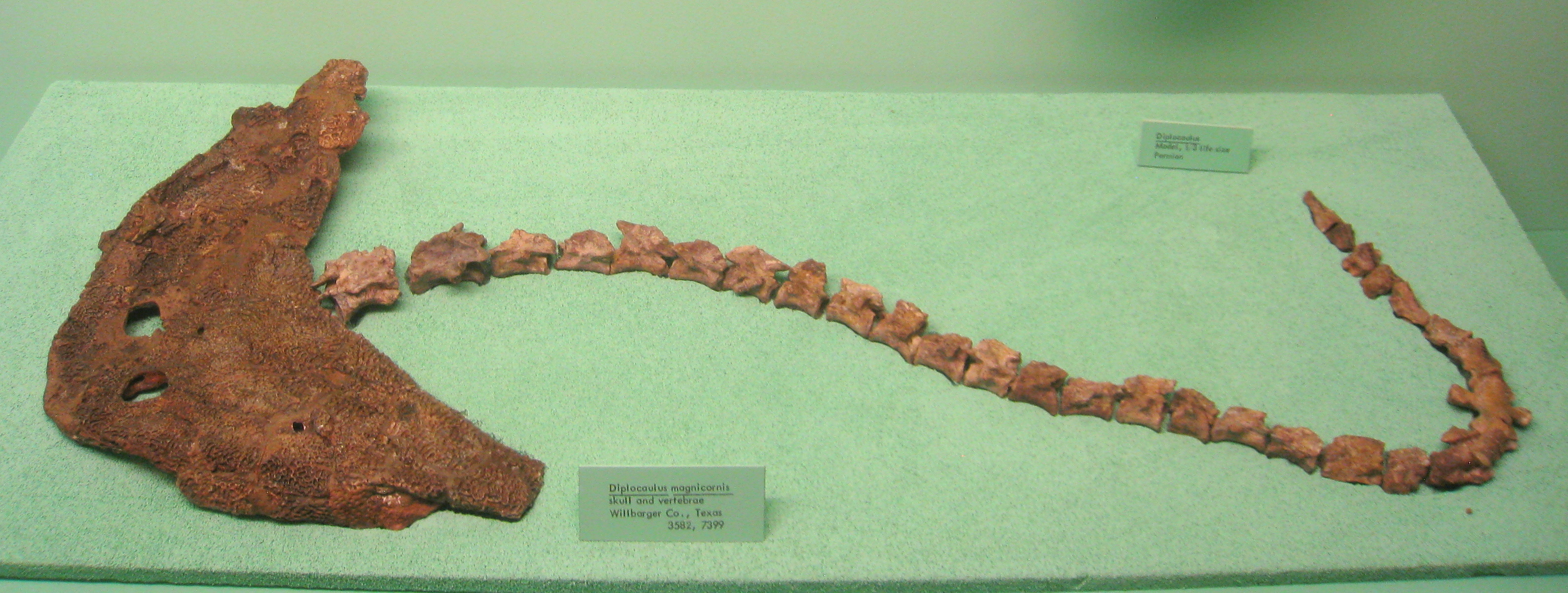
- Fossilized axial skeleton of the Carboniferous-Permian amphibian Diplocaulus
  †Diplocaulus – type locality for genus
  - †Diplocaulus magnicornis
  - †Diplocaulus parvus – type locality for species
  - †Diplocaulus primus – type locality for species
- †Diplograptus
  - †Diplograptus maxwelli
- †Diplothmema
  - †Diplothmema pachyderma
- †Diplotrypa
  - †Diplotrypa bassleri
- †Discitoceras
- †Disparifusa
  - †Disparifusa hystricosa
- †Distacodus
  - †Distacodus oklahomensis – type locality for species
- †Ditaxineura
  - †Ditaxineura cellulosa
- †Ditoecholasma
- †Ditomopyge
  - †Ditomopyge parvulus – or unidentified comparable form
- †Dizygopleura
- †Doleotheca
- †Doleroides
  - †Doleroides compressus
  - †Doleroides oklahomensis
  - †Doleroides vescus
- †Dolerophyllum – tentative report
- †Dolerorthis
  - †Dolerorthis hami
  - †Dolerorthis nanella
  - †Dolerorthis savagei
- †Doleserpeton – type locality for genus
  - †Doleserpeton annectens – type locality for species
- †Dolichoharpes
  - †Dolichoharpes reticulata
- †Doliocrinus
- †Domatoceras
  - †Domatoceras collinsvillense – type locality for species
  - †Domatoceras williamsi
- †Donaldina
  - †Donaldina attenuata
  - †Donaldina grantonensis
- †Donezella
- †Donovaniconus
  - †Donovaniconus oklahomensis – type locality for species
- †Drepanoistodus
  - †Drepanoistodus suberectus
- †Dudleyaspis
- †Dunbarites
  - †Dunbarites rectilateralis
  - †Dunbarites wewokensis – type locality for species
- †Duncanella

== E ==
- †Earlandinita
- †Eatonia
  - †Eatonia exserta
- †Ecculiomphalus – tentative report
- †Echinaria
- †Echinoconchus
  - †Echinoconchus elegans
- †Echinocrinus
  - †Echinocrinus cratis – or unidentified related form
- †Echinoencrinites – tentative report
  - †Echinoencrinites ornatus
- †Echinoprimitia
  - †Echinoprimitia imputata
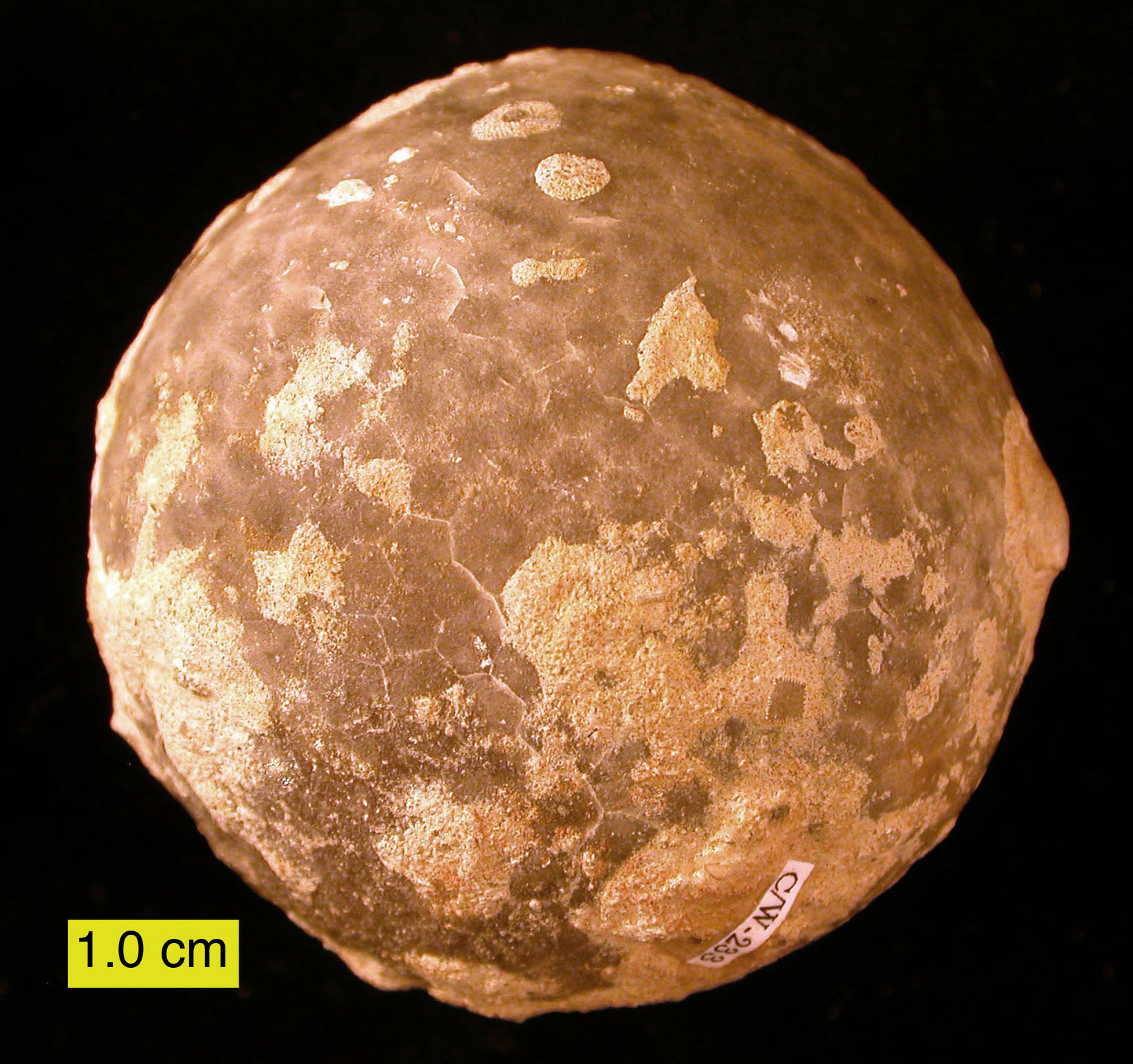
- Fossil of the Early-Middle Ordovician cystoid echinoderm Echinosphaerites
  †Echinosphaerites
  - †Echinosphaerites aurantium
- †Economolopsis
  - †Economolopsis anodontoides
- †Ectenaspis
  - †Ectenaspis burkhalteri – type locality for species
- †Ectenocrinus
- †Ectenoglossa – tentative report
  - †Ectenoglossa sculpta
- †Ectosteorhachis
  - †Ectosteorhachis nitidus – or unidentified comparable form
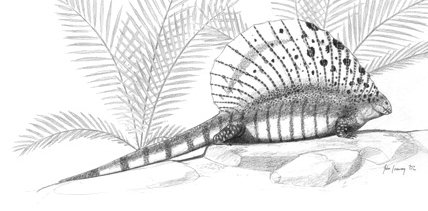
- Life restoration of the Carboniferous-Permian synapsid (mammal precursor) Edaphosaurus
  †Edaphosaurus
  - †Edaphosaurus cruciger
- †Edestus – type locality for genus
  - †Edestus vorax – type locality for species
- †Edmondia
  - †Edmondia rotunda – type locality for species
  - †Edmondia senilis – or unidentified comparable form
  - †Edmondia splendens – type locality for species
- †Edriocrinus
- †Edriophus
- †Ehlersia
- †Elibatocrinus
  - †Elibatocrinus elongatus – or unidentified comparable form
- †Elmoa
  - †Elmoa trisecta
- †Elpidocrinus
  - †Elpidocrinus tuberosus
- †Embolaster – type locality for genus
  - †Embolaster graffhami – type locality for species
- †Emilites
  - †Emilites bennisoni – type locality for species
- †Enchostoma – tentative report
  - †Enchostoma bicarinatum – or unidentified comparable form
- †Endelocrinus
  - †Endelocrinus matheri
- †Endosporites
  - †Endosporites globiformis
  - †Endosporites plicatus
  - †Endosporites zonalis
- †Endothyra
  - †Endothyra bowmani
- †Endothyranella
- †Enteletes
- †Entelophyllum
- †Enterolasma
- †Eoasianites
- †Eochiton
  - †Eochiton arbucklensis – type locality for species
- †Eochonetes
  - †Eochonetes magna
- †Eodictyonella (formerly Dictyonella)
  - †Eodictyonella gibbosa
- †Eohippioceras
  - †Eohippioceras ferratum
- †Eohollina
  - †Eohollina depressa
  - †Eohollina papillata
- †Eoleperditia
  - †Eoleperditia fabulites
  - †Eoleperditia inflativentralis
- †Eolissochonetes
- †Eomartiniopsis
  - †Eomartiniopsis rostrata
- †Eomonorachus
  - †Eomonorachus divaricatus
- †Eopinnacrinus
- †Eopleurophorus – type locality for genus
  - †Eopleurophorus immaturus
  - †Eopleurophorus spinulosa – or unidentified comparable form
- †Eoprimitia
  - †Eoprimitia bailyana
  - †Eoprimitia cooperi
  - †Eoprimitia quadrata
  - †Eoprimitia subnodosa
- †Eorobergia
  - †Eorobergia marginalis – or unidentified comparable form
- †Eoschistoceras
  - †Eoschistoceras strawnense
- †Eospirifer
  - †Eospirifer acutolineatus
- †Eotomaria
- †Ephedripites
  - †Ephedripites corrugatus – type locality for species
- †Epiphyton
- †Equisetites
- †Equisetosporites
- †Eridoconcha
  - †Eridoconcha magna
  - †Eridoconcha simpsoni
- †Eridopora
  - †Eridopora radiata
  - †Eridopora stellata
- †Eridotrypa
  - †Eridotrypa abrupta
- †Erismodus – tentative report
- †Erisocrinus
  - †Erisocrinus wapanucka
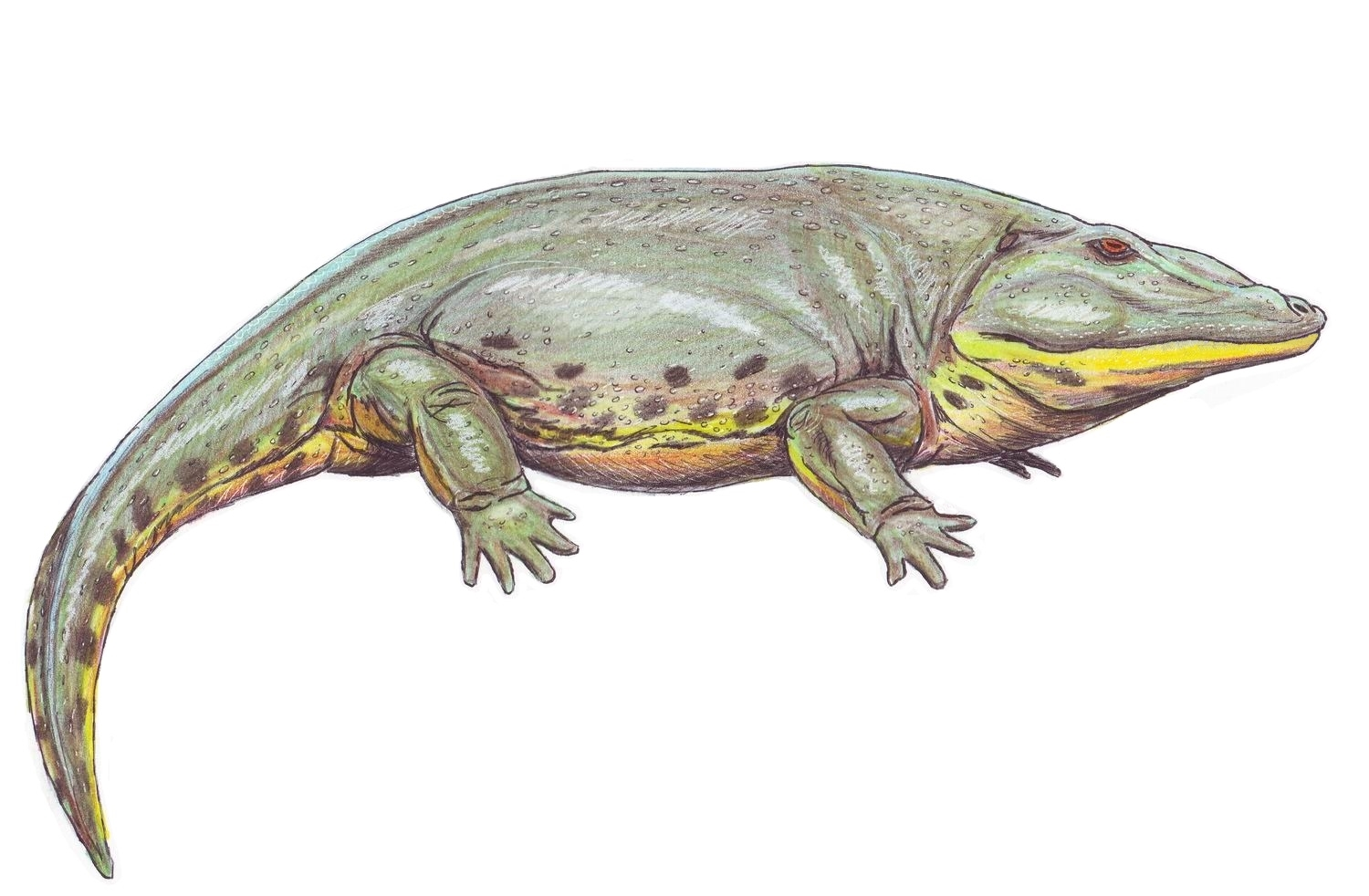
- Life restoration of the Carboniferous-Permian amphibian Eryops
  †Eryops
  - †Eryops megacephalus
- †Escharopora
  - †Escharopora recta
- †Estheria
- †Ethelocrinus – tentative report
  - †Ethelocrinus kirki
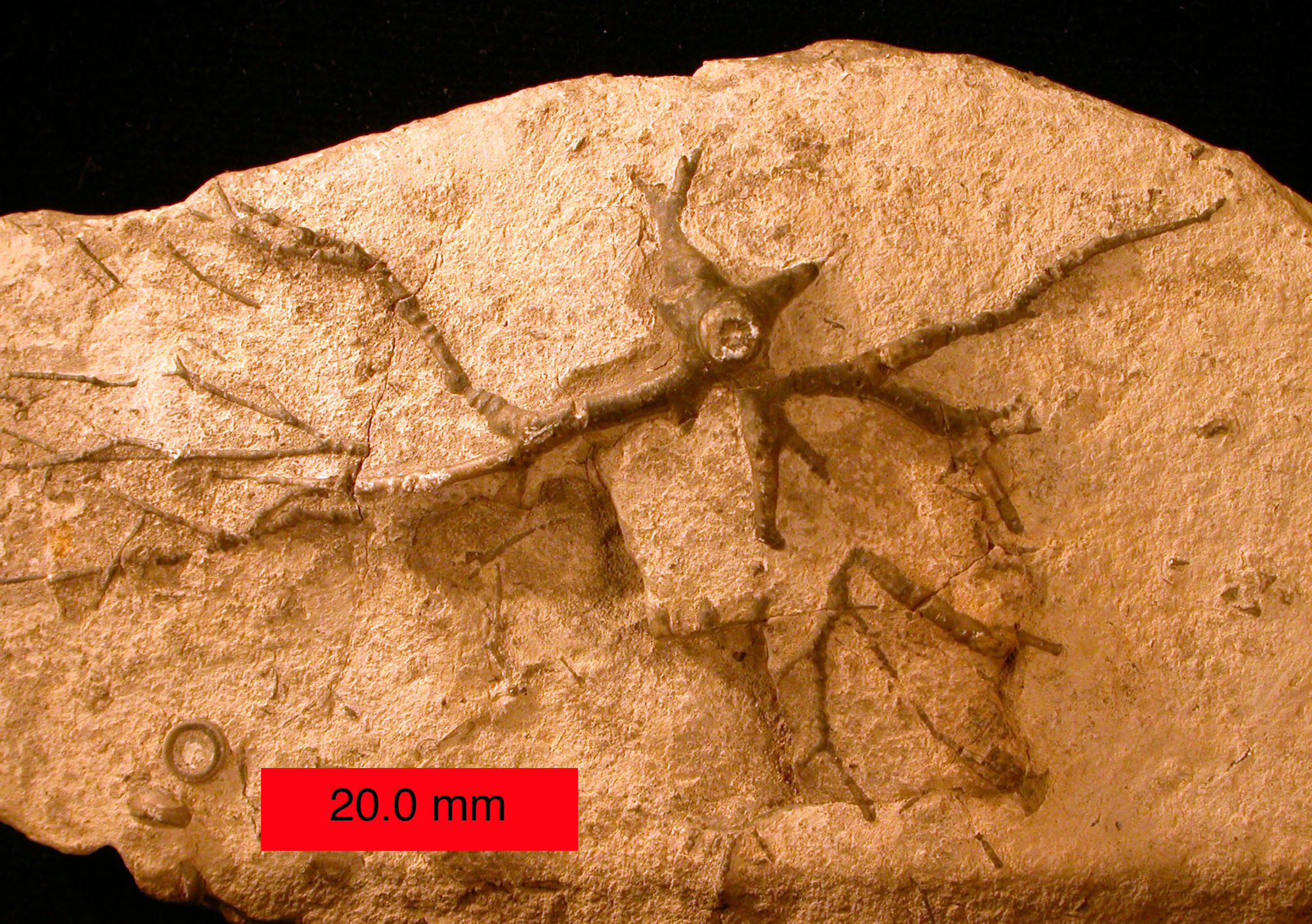
- Fossilized holdfast of the Silurian-Middle Devonian crinoid ("sea lily") Eucalyptocrinites
  †Eucalyptocrinites
  - †Eucalyptocrinites pernodosus
- †Euchondria
  - †Euchondria subquadrata – type locality for species
- †Eucraterellina
  - †Eucraterellina oblonga
  - †Eucraterellina randolphi
  - †Eucraterellina spitznasi
- †Eucystis
- †Eudissoceras – type locality for genus
  - †Eudissoceras collinsvillense – type locality for species
- †Eukloedenella
- †Eumartynovia – type locality for genus
  - †Eumartynovia raaschi – type locality for species
- †Eumetria
  - †Eumetria deltoides – type locality for species
  - †Eumetria matheri – type locality for species
  - †Eumetria vera
  - †Eumetria verneuiliana
- †Eumorphoceras
  - †Eumorphoceras bisulcatum
  - †Eumorphoceras girtyi
- †Eumorphocystis
  - †Eumorphocystis multiporata
- †Euonychocrinus
- †Eupachycrinus
  - †Eupachycrinus magister – or unidentified comparable form
  - †Eupachycrinus verrucosus
- †Euphemites
  - †Euphemites carbonarius
  - †Euphemites compressus – type locality for species
- †Eurychilina
  - †Eurychilina papillata
  - †Eurychilina subradiata
  - †Eurychilina ventrosa
- †Eurygonum
  - †Eurygonum nodosum
- †Euryodus
  - †Euryodus dalyae – type locality for species
  - †Euryodus primus – or unidentified comparable form
- †Eusphenopteris
  - †Eusphenopteris scribanii-striata – informal
- †Euspirocrinus
  - †Euspirocrinus cirratus
- †Exocrinus
- †Exoriocrinus

== F ==
- †Failleana
  - †Failleana limbata – or unidentified comparable form
- †Falcisporites
  - †Falcisporites zapfei
- †Fardenia
  - †Fardenia attenuata
  - †Fardenia reedsi
- †Fascichnus
  - †Fascichnus dactylus
  - †Fascichnus frutex
- †Fascifera
  - †Fascifera dalmanelloidea
- †Fastigatisporites
  - †Fastigatisporites physema – type locality for species
- †Favosites
- †Fayella – type locality for genus
  - †Fayella chickashaensis – type locality for species
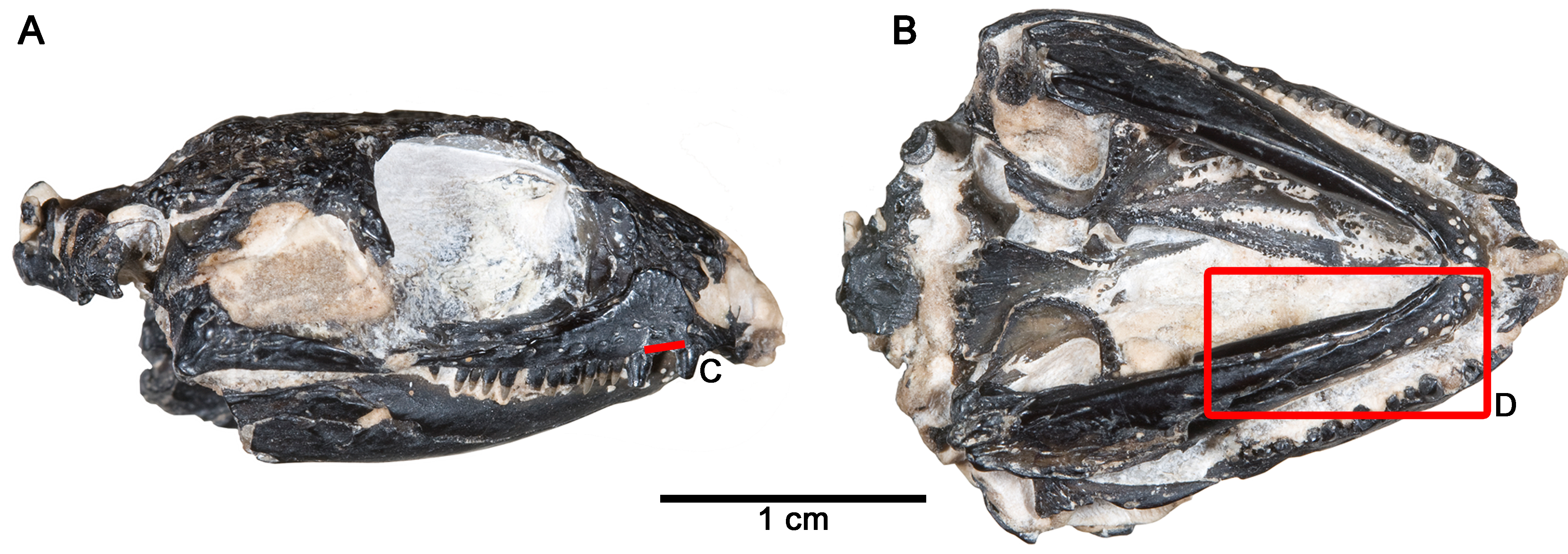
- Fossilized skull in multiple views of the Permian primitive reptile Feeserpeton
  †Feeserpeton – type locality for genus
  - †Feeserpeton oklahomensis – type locality for species
- †Fenestella
  - †Fenestella ardmorensis
  - †Fenestella bendensis – type locality for species
  - †Fenestella cestriensis
  - †Fenestella chesterensis – or unidentified comparable form
  - †Fenestella cumingsi
  - †Fenestella exigua
  - †Fenestella frutex – or unidentified comparable form
  - †Fenestella granularis – type locality for species
  - †Fenestella kosomensis – type locality for species
  - †Fenestella morrowensis
  - †Fenestella oklahomensis – type locality for species
  - †Fenestella ovatipora – type locality for species
  - †Fenestella paradisensis
  - †Fenestella rara – type locality for species
  - †Fenestella serratula
- †Fenesteverta – type locality for genus
  - †Fenesteverta nicklesi – type locality for species
- †Fernglenia
  - †Fernglenia vernonensis
- †Finkelnburgia
  - †Finkelnburgia crassicostata
- †Fistulipora
- †Flexifenestella
  - †Flexifenestella grandis – type locality for species
- †Florinites
  - †Florinites mediapudens
  - †Florinites millotti
  - †Florinites similis
  - †Florinites visendus
  - †Florinites volans
- †Foerstediscus
- †Foerstia
  - †Foerstia ohioensis
- †Fragiscutellum
  - †Fragiscutellum glebalis
- †Fragiscutum
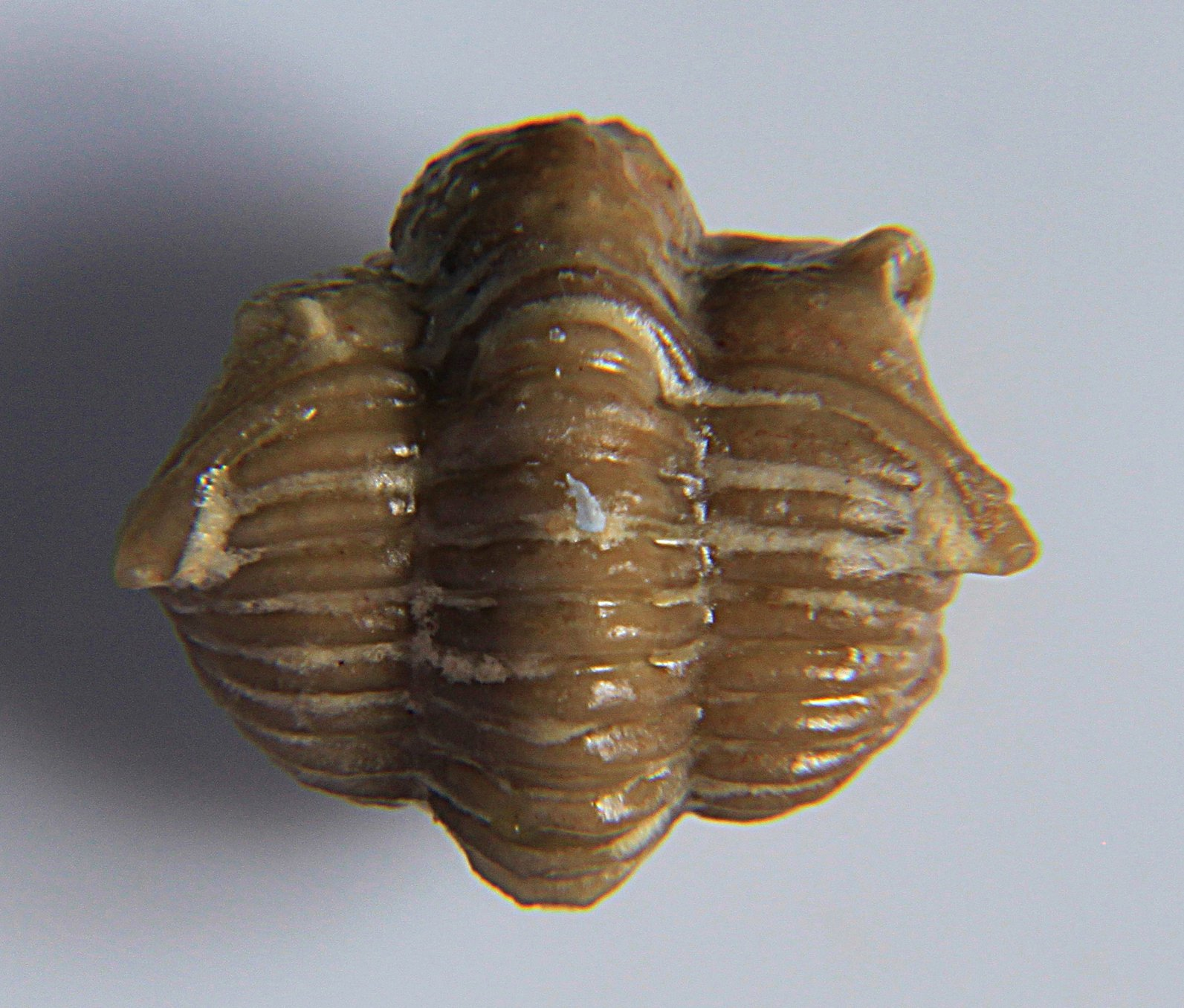
- Fossil in an enrolled posture of the Late Ordovician trilobite Frencrinuroides
  †Frencrinuroides
  - †Frencrinuroides capitonis
- †Fusulina

== G ==
- †Galateacrinus
- †Gardenasporites
  - †Gardenasporites heisselii
- †Garwoodia
- †Gastrioceras
  - †Gastrioceras adaense
  - †Gastrioceras fittsi
  - †Gastrioceras prone – type locality for species
  - †Gastrioceras retiferum – type locality for species
- †Gazacrinus
  - †Gazacrinus stellatus
- †Gelasinocephalus
  - †Gelasinocephalus pustulosus
  - †Gelasinocephalus whittingtoni
- †Geniculifera
  - †Geniculifera siphuncula – type locality for species
- †Gigagramma – type locality for genus
  - †Gigagramma carpenteri – type locality for species
- †Gigantopteris
  - †Gigantopteris americana
- †Girtycoelia
- †Girtyella
- †Girtyspira
  - †Girtyspira alvaensis – type locality for species
- †Girvanella
- †Gissocrinus
  - †Gissocrinus quadratus
- †Glabovalvulina – tentative report
- †Glabrocingulum
  - †Glabrocingulum grayvillense
  - †Glabrocingulum stellaeformis
  - †Glabrocingulum wannense – type locality for species
- †Glaphurochiton
- †Glaphyrites
  - †Glaphyrites angulatus
  - †Glaphyrites excelsus – type locality for species
  - †Glaphyrites hyattianus
  - †Glaphyrites subdiscus
  - †Glaphyrites warei – type locality for species
- †Glaphyrophlebia
  - †Glaphyrophlebia anderhalterorum – type locality for species
- †Glaukosocrinus
- †Globivalvulina
- †Globovalvulina
- †Globulocystites
  - †Globulocystites cristatus
  - †Globulocystites infundus
- †Glosella
  - †Glosella liumbona
- †Gloverilima
  - †Gloverilima pratti
- †Glymmatobolbina
  - †Glymmatobolbina quadrata
- †Glyprorthis
  - †Glyprorthis costellata
- †Glyptocystella
  - †Glyptocystella loeblichae
- †Glyptocystites
  - †Glyptocystites forbesi
  - †Glyptocystites loeblichae
  - †Glyptocystites logani
  - †Glyptocystites multiporus
  - †Glyptocystites regnelli – or unidentified comparable form
- †Glyptopleura
  - †Glyptopleura geisi – type locality for species
  - †Glyptopleura scotti – type locality for species
  - †Glyptopleura warthini – type locality for species
- †Glyptorthis
  - †Glyptorthis crenulata – type locality for species
  - †Glyptorthis glaseri
  - †Glyptorthis obesa – type locality for species
  - †Glyptorthis uncinata – type locality for species
- †Gnathodus
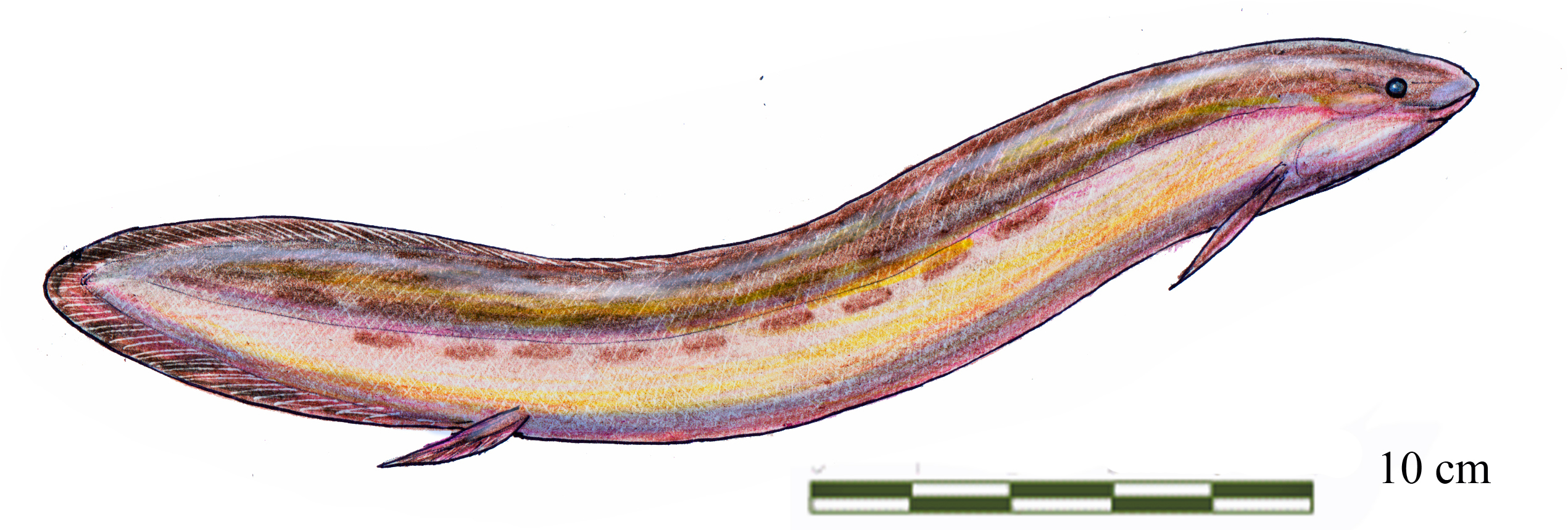
- Life restoration of the Permian lungfish Gnathorhiza
  †Gnathorhiza
  - †Gnathorhiza serrata
- †Gnetalesaccus
  - †Gnetalesaccus variabilis
- †Gnorimocrinus
  - †Gnorimocrinus pontotocensis
- †Goniasma
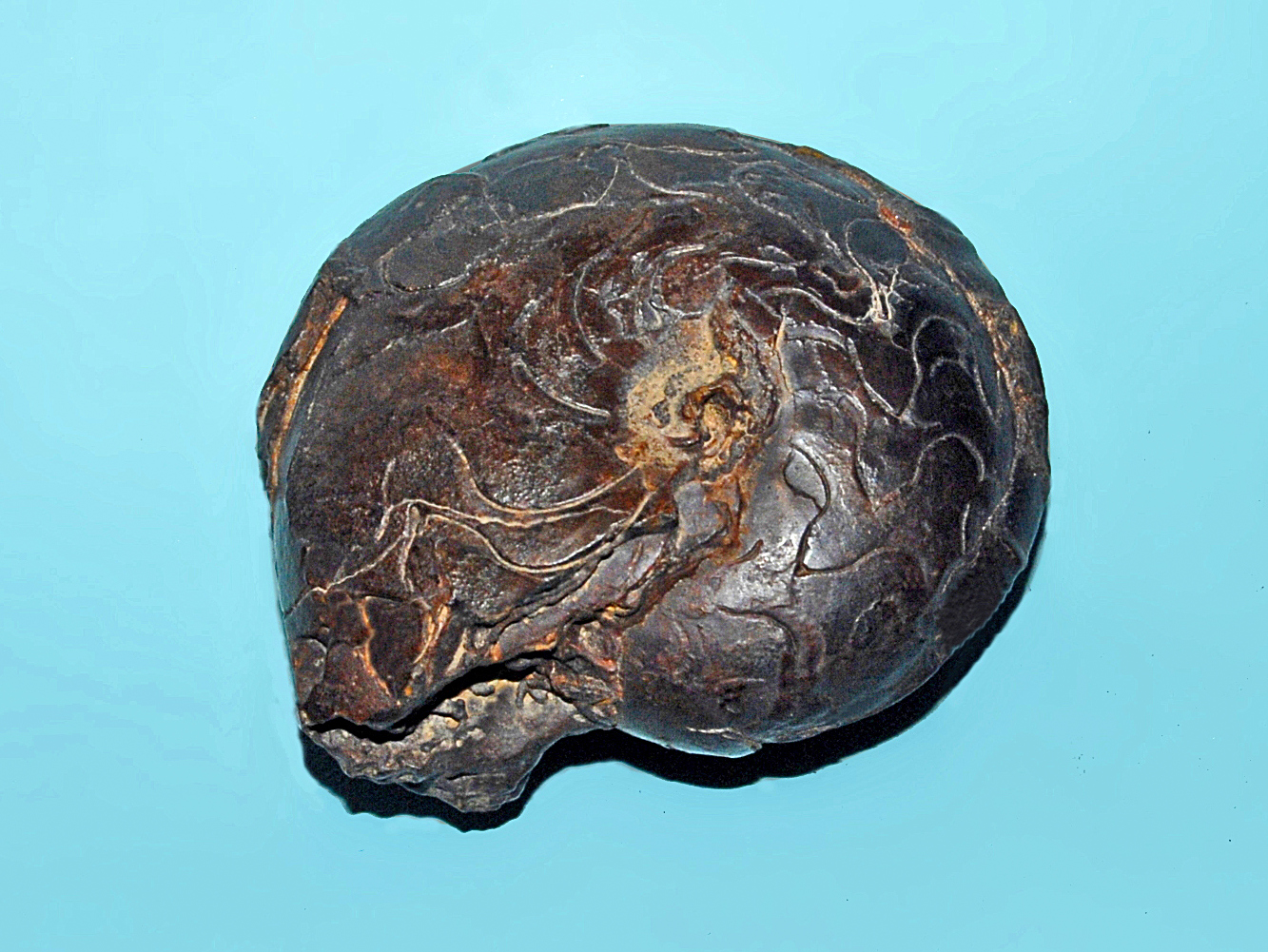
- Fossilized shell of the Late Devonian-Late Triassic ammonoid cephalopod Goniatites
  †Goniatites
  - †Goniatites multiliratus – type locality for species
- †Gonioglyphioceras
  - †Gonioglyphioceras gracile
- †Gonioloboceratoides
- †Goniophora
- †Gorgonisphaeridium
  - †Gorgonisphaeridium antiquum
- †Gotlandochiton
  - †Gotlandochiton hami – type locality for species
- †Graffhamicrinus
  - †Graffhamicrinus antiquus
- †Grammolomatella
- †Granasporites
  - †Granasporites medius
- †Grandfieldia – type locality for genus
  - †Grandfieldia callilepidota – type locality for species
- †Granulatisporites
  - †Granulatisporites granularis
  - †Granulatisporites granulatus
  - †Granulatisporites microgranifer
  - †Granulatisporites minutus
  - †Granulatisporites verrucosus
- †Graptodictya
  - †Graptodictya elegantula
- †Griffithidella
  - †Griffithidella alternata
  - †Griffithidella doris
- †Gryphellina
  - †Gryphellina sellardsi – type locality for species
- †Grypocrinus
- †Gyalorhethium
  - †Gyalorhethium chondrodes
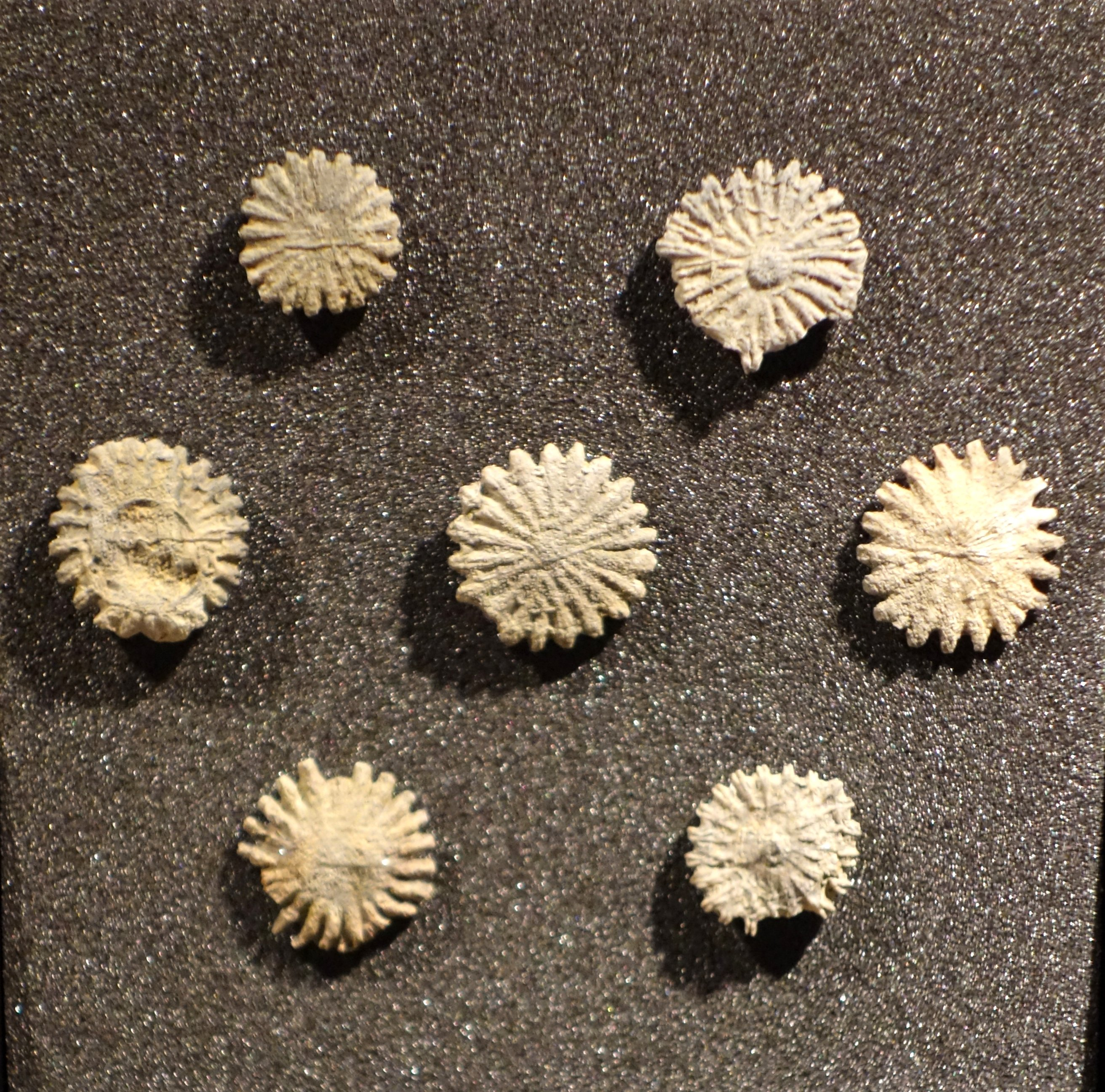
- Fossils of the Carboniferous coral Gymnophyllum, also known as button coral
  †Gymnophyllum
  - †Gymnophyllum wardi
- †Gypidula
  - †Gypidula multicostata
- †Gyronema

== H ==
- †Hagnocrinus
- †Halliella
  - †Halliella labiosa
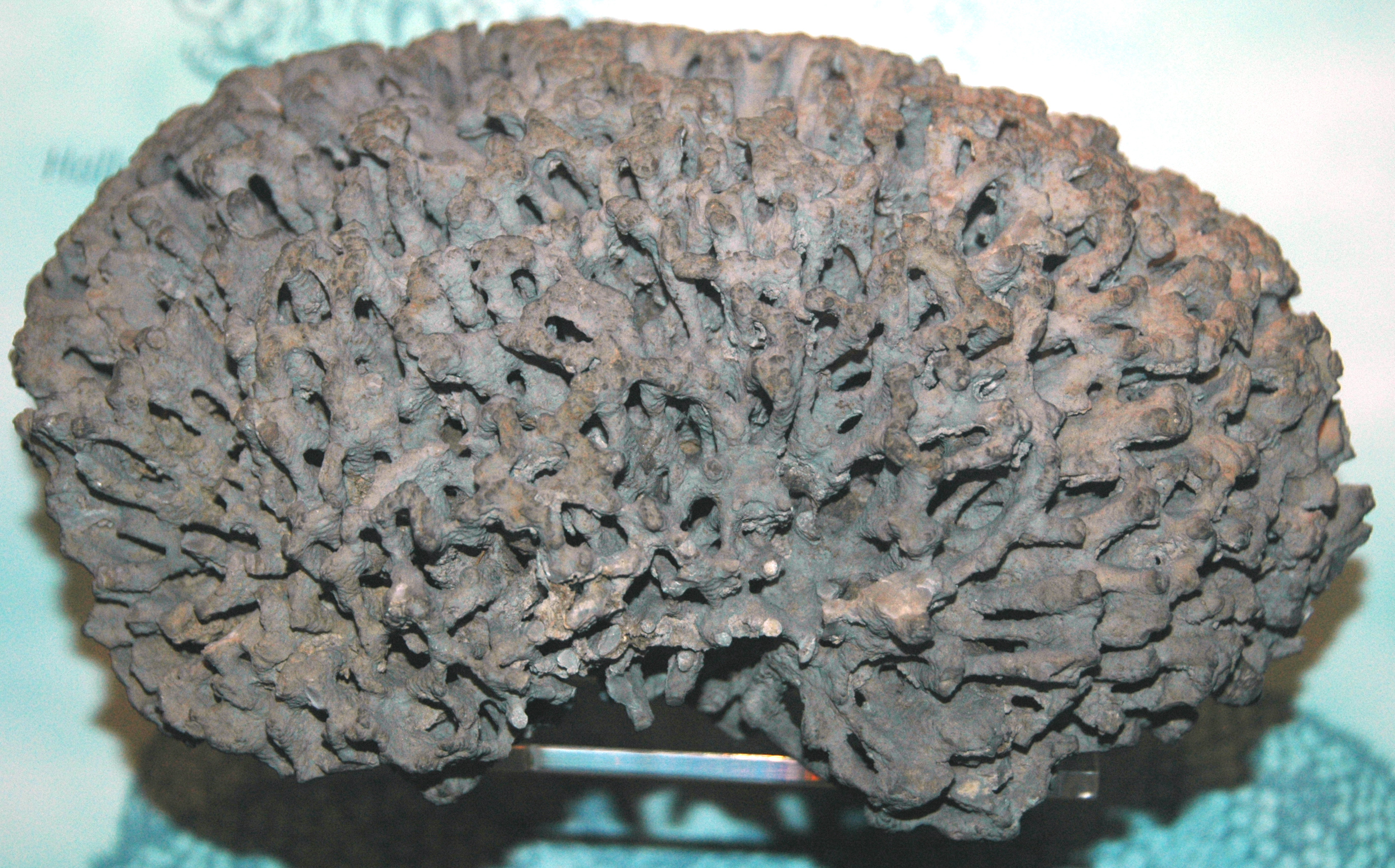
- Fossil of the Ordovician bryozoan ("moss animal") Hallopora
  †Hallopora
  - †Hallopora dubia
  - †Hallopora macrostoma
  - †Hallopora multitabulata
  - †Hallopora pachymura
- †Halysites
- †Hamiapollenites – type locality for genus
  - †Hamiapollenites karrooensis
  - †Hamiapollenites saccatus – type locality for species
  - †Hamiapollenites tractiferinus
- †Haplistion
  - †Haplistion apletum – type locality for species
- †Hapsidopareion – type locality for genus
  - †Hapsidopareion lepton – type locality for species
- †Harpidella
  - †Harpidella butorus
- †Harpillaenus
- †Healdia
  - †Healdia caneyensis
  - †Healdia compressa
  - †Healdia harltoni – type locality for species
  - †Healdia simplicissima – type locality for species
- †Hebetorthoceras
  - †Hebetorthoceras brokenarrowense
- †Heliolites
- †Heliosocrinus
  - †Heliosocrinus neotosus – type locality for species
- †Helminthochiton
  - †Helminthochiton riddlei
- †Hemiliroceras
  - †Hemiliroceras reticulatum – type locality for species
- †Hemiphragma
  - †Hemiphragma irrasum
  - †Hemiphragma pulchra
- †Hesperocystis
  - †Hesperocystis deckeri
- †Hesperorthis
  - †Hesperorthis crinerensis
  - †Hesperorthis rowlandi
  - †Hesperorthis sulcata
- †Heterangium
- †Heteropecten
  - †Heteropecten vanvleeti – type locality for species
- †Heterotrypa
  - †Heterotrypa taffi
- †Hexacrinites
  - †Hexacrinites adaensis
  - †Hexacrinites carinatus
- †Hibbertia
- †Hindia
- †Hindiodella
- †Hippocrepina
  - †Hippocrepina bendensis
- †Hiscobeccus
  - †Hiscobeccus capax
- †Hoffmeisterites – type locality for genus
  - †Hoffmeisterites microdens – type locality for species
- †Holcospermum
- †Hollinella
  - †Hollinella burlingamensis
  - †Hollinella radiata
- †Holmesella
  - †Holmesella triangularis – type locality for species
  - †Holmesella wapanuckensis – type locality for species
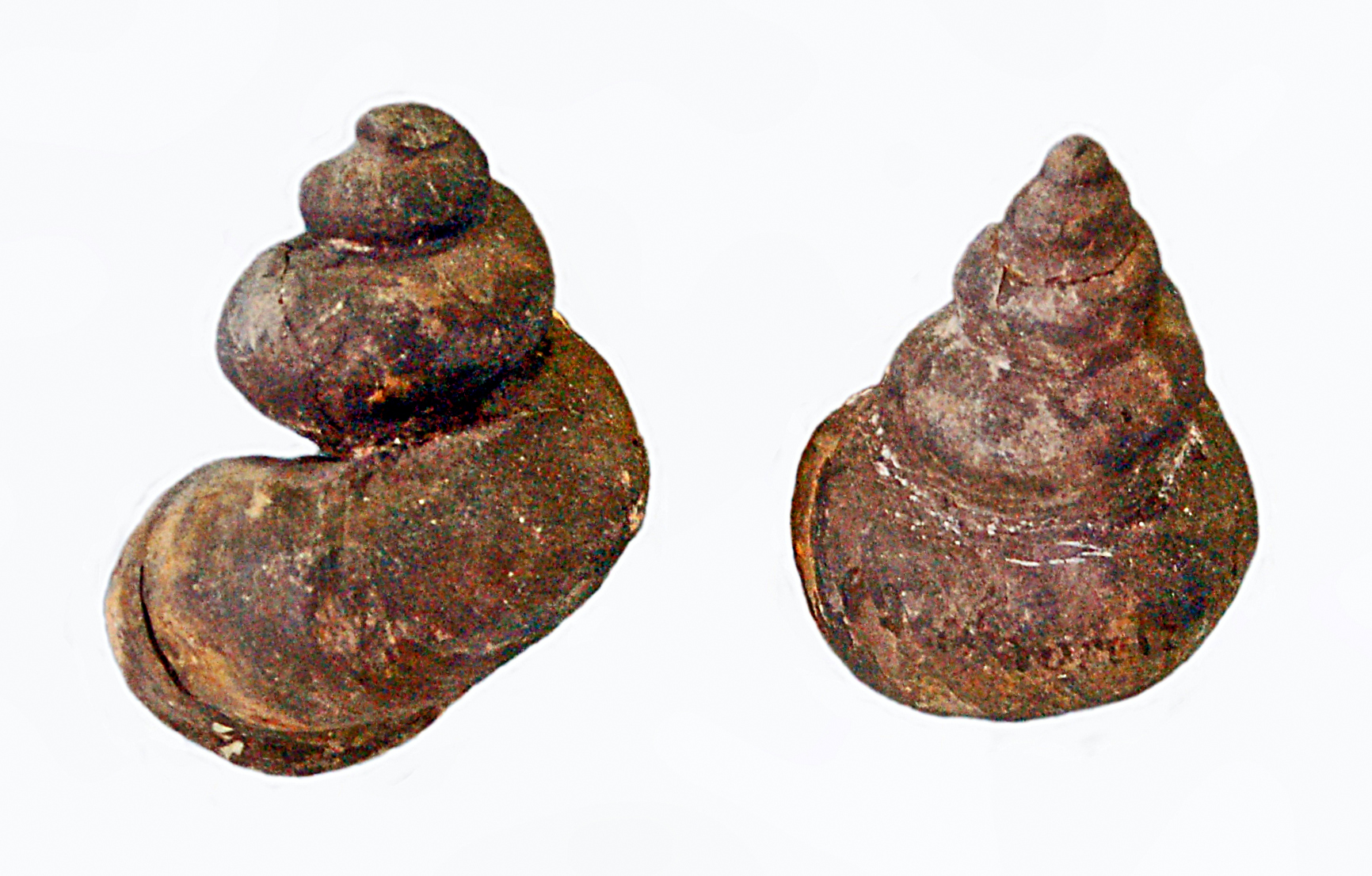
- Fossilized shells of the Ordovician-Carboniferous sea snail Holopea
  †Holopea – tentative report
- †Homocladus
  - †Homocladus grandis
- †Homoeospira
  - †Homoeospira costatula
  - †Homoeospira foerstei
  - †Homoeospira subgibbosa
- †Homotrypa
  - †Homotrypa callitoecha
  - †Homotrypa dickeyvillensis
  - †Homotrypa multitabulata
  - †Homotrypa sagittata
  - †Homotrypa tuberculata
  - †Homotrypa ulrichi
- †Hormotoma
- †Howellella
  - †Howellella cycloptera
  - †Howellella henryhousensis
  - †Howellella splendens
- †Hudsonaster
- †Huntonella – type locality for genus
  - †Huntonella unicornis – type locality for species
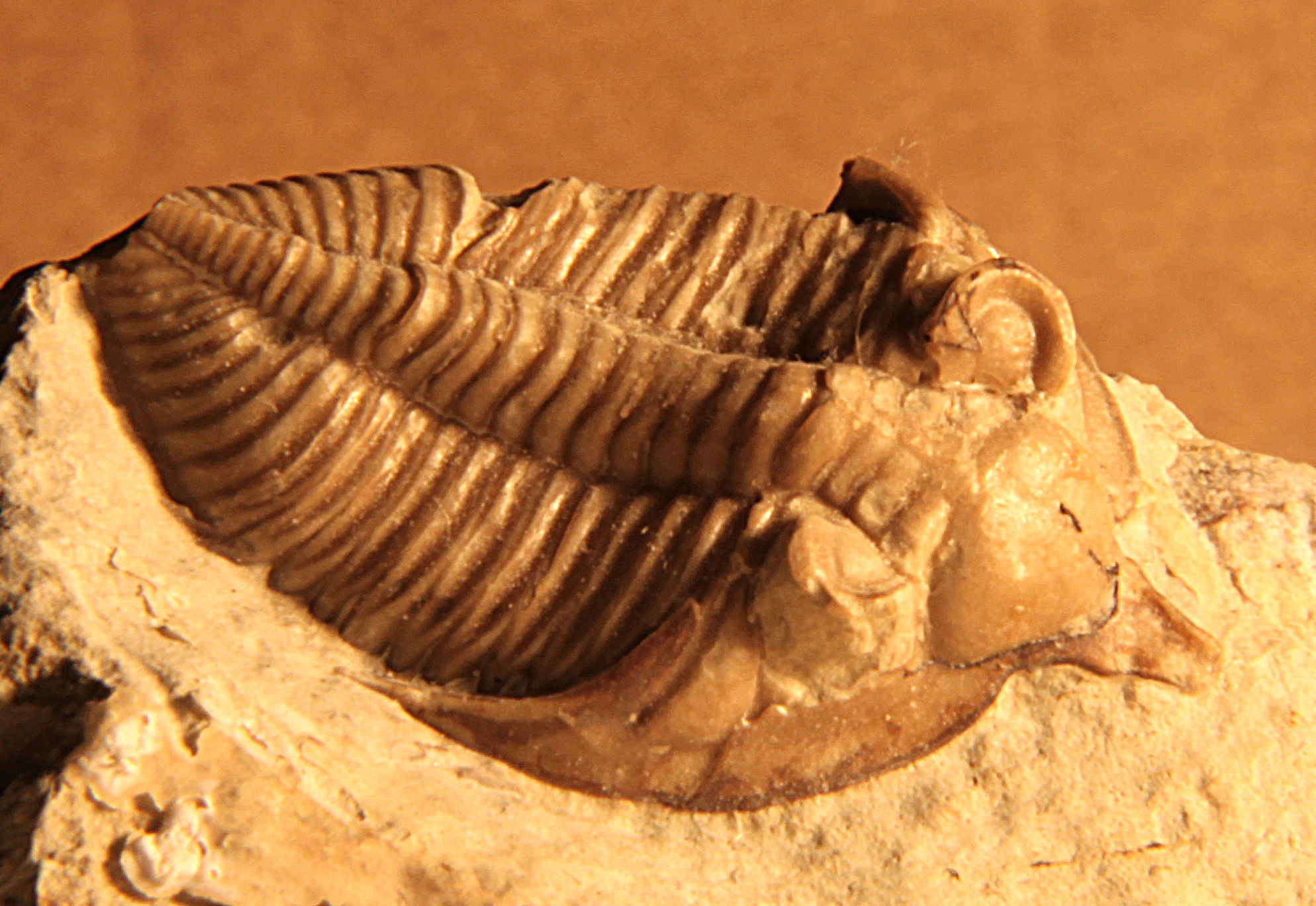
- Fossil of the Early Devonian trilobite Huntoniatonia
  †Huntoniatonia
  - †Huntoniatonia huntonensis
  - †Huntoniatonia lingulifer
  - †Huntoniatonia oklahomae
  - †Huntoniatonia purduei
- †Hustedia
  - †Hustedia mormoni – or unidentified comparable form
- †Hybocrinus
  - †Hybocrinus conicus
  - †Hybocrinus crinerensis
  - †Hybocrinus nitidus
  - †Hybocrinus pyxidatus
- †Hydreionocrinus
  - †Hydreionocrinus patulus
- Hyperammina
  - †Hyperammina elongata
  - †Hyperammina johnsvalleyensis – type locality for species
  - †Hyperammina rugosa
- †Hyperamminoides
  - †Hyperamminoides glabra
- †Hyperchilarina
  - †Hyperchilarina nodosimarginata
- †Hypergonia
  - †Hypergonia quadricarinata – or unidentified comparable form
  - †Hypergonia tatei – or unidentified related form

== I ==
- †Ianthinopsis
- †Icthyocrinus
  - †Icthyocrinus corbis
- †Idiognathodus
  - †Idiognathodus delicates
  - †Idiognathodus sinuatus
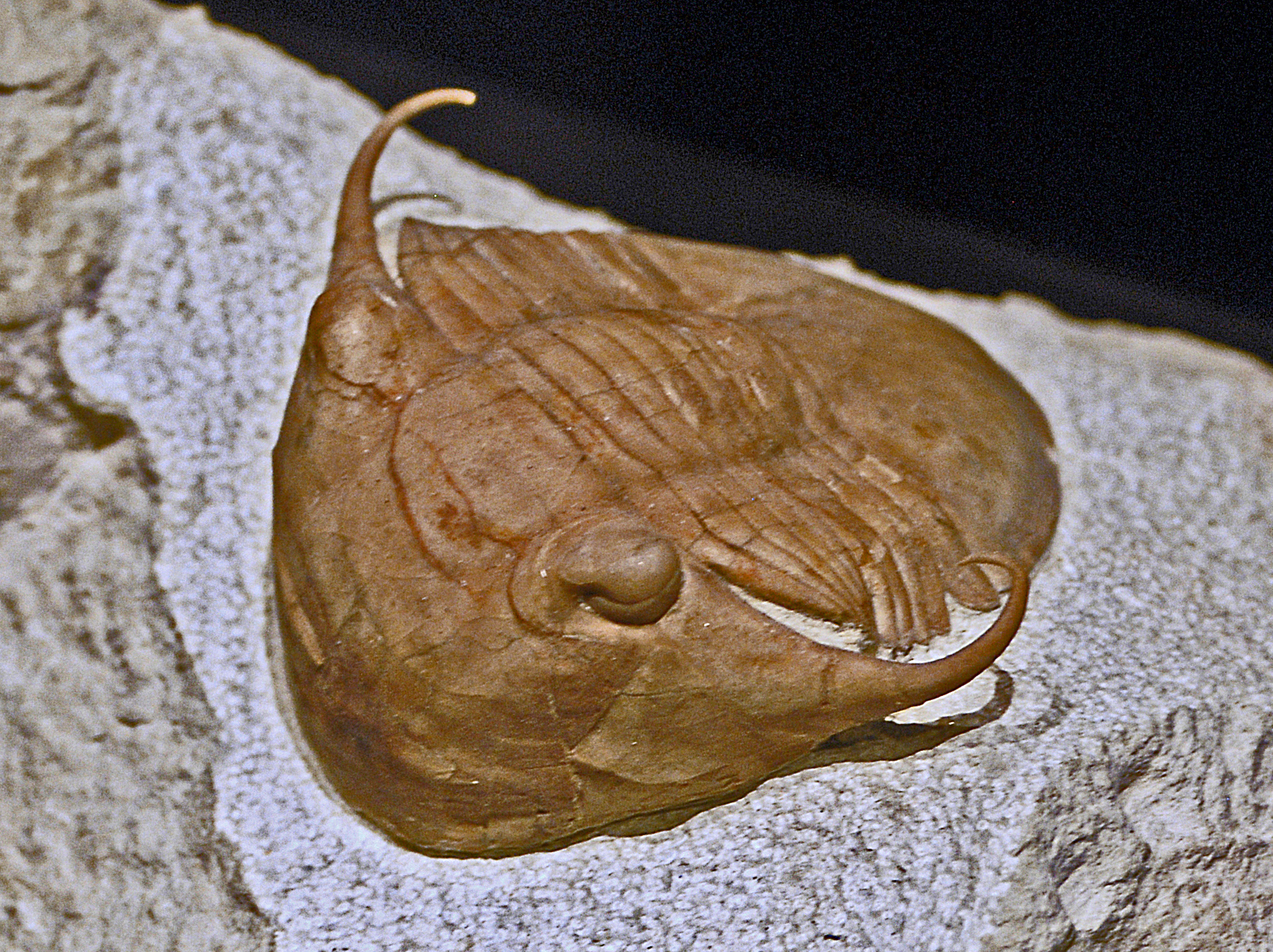
- Fossil of the Middle Ordovician trilobite Illaenus
  †Illaenus
  - †Illaenus utahensis – or unidentified comparable form
- †Illenites
  - †Illenites delasaucei
  - †Illenites parvus
- †Inflatia
  - †Inflatia cherokeensis
  - †Inflatia clydensis
  - †Inflatia cooperi
  - †Inflatia gracilis
  - †Inflatia inflata
  - †Inflatia pusilla
  - †Inflatia succincta – type locality for species
- †Ischyrotoma
  - †Ischyrotoma sila
- †Isoallagecrinus
  - †Isoallagecrinus barnettensis – type locality for species
- †Isochilina
  - †Isochilina bulbosa
- †Isorthis
  - †Isorthis arcuaria
  - †Isorthis pygmaea
- †Isoteloides
  - †Isoteloides peri
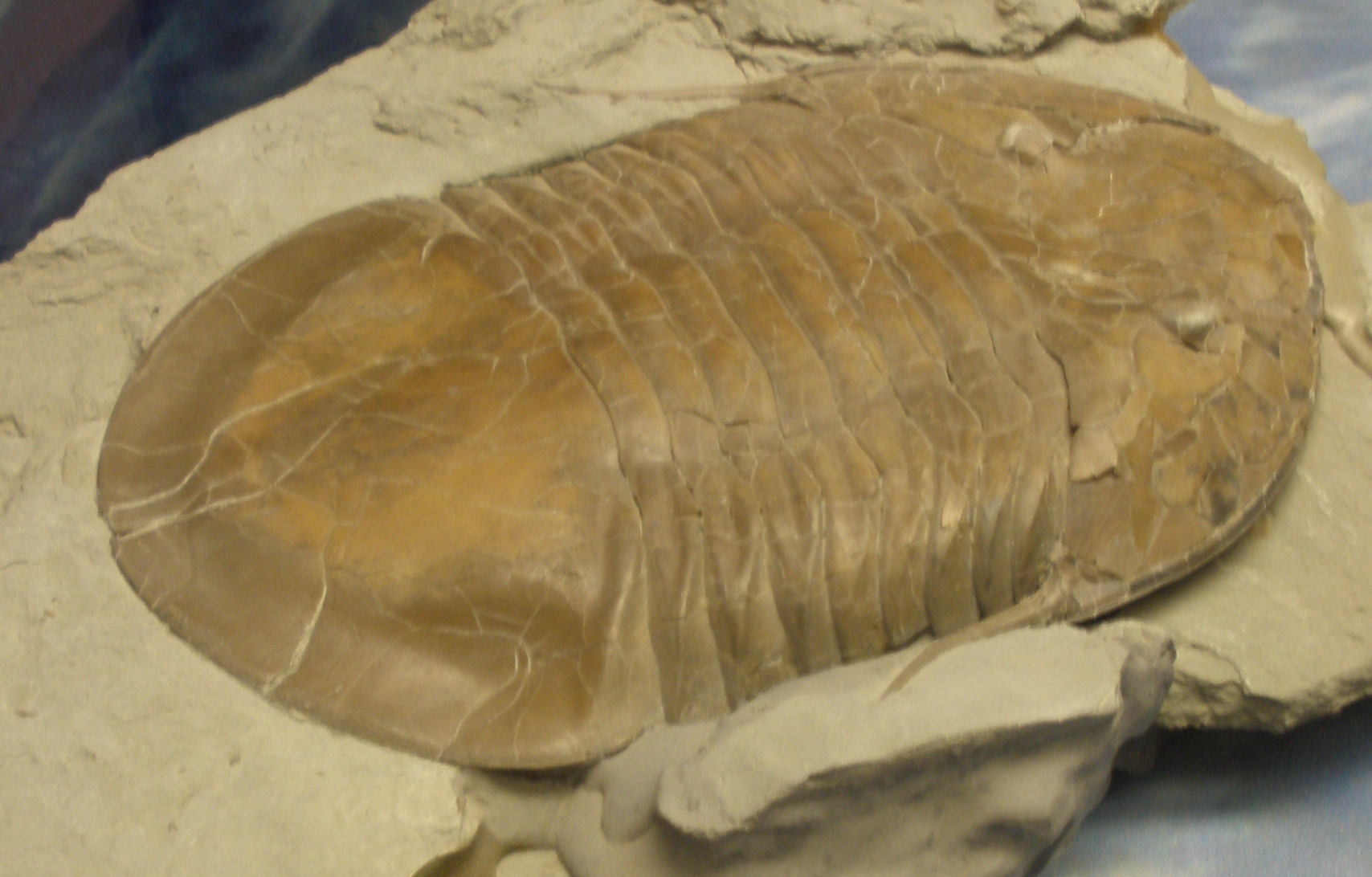
- Fossil of the Middle-Late Ordovician giant trilobite Isotelus.
  †Isotelus
  - †Isotelus bradleyi – type locality for species
  - †Isotelus violaensis – type locality for species
- †Ivanovia – tentative report
- †Ivoechiton
  - †Ivoechiton calathicolus – type locality for species
  - †Ivoechiton oklahomensis – type locality for species

== J ==
- †Janusella
  - †Janusella biceratina
- †Jeffersonia
  - †Jeffersonia granosa
  - †Jeffersonia jenni
  - †Jeffersonia ulrichi
- †Jonesina
  - †Jonesina spinigera – or unidentified comparable form
- †Jonesites
  - †Jonesites circa
  - †Jonesites huntonensis – type locality for species
- †Juresania

== K ==
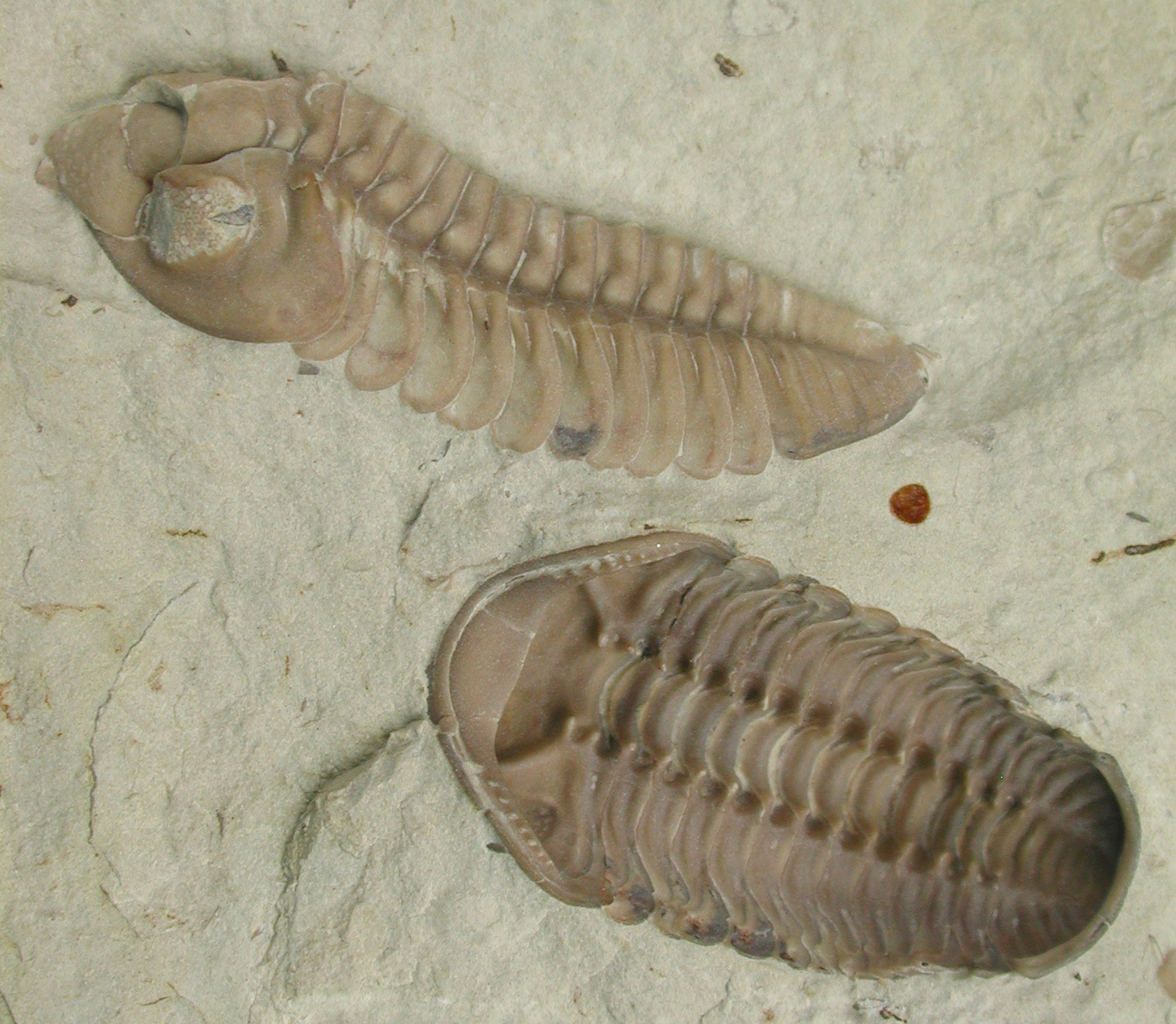
- Fossils of the Early Devonian trilobite Kainops
  †Kainops
  - †Kainops invius
  - †Kainops raymondi
- †Kallimorphocrinus
  - †Kallimorphocrinus eaglei – type locality for species
- †Kawina
- †Kayina
  - †Kayina hybosa
  - †Kayina porosa
- †Kennedya
  - †Kennedya fraseri – type locality for species
  - †Kennedya mirabilis
- †Keokukia
  - †Keokukia sulcata
- †Kettneraspis
  - †Kettneraspis williamsi
- †Kirkbya
  - †Kirkbya bendensis – type locality for species
  - †Kirkbya moorei
  - †Kirkbya symmetrica
- †Kirkbyella
  - †Kirkbyella obliqua
- †Kirkidium
- †Kirkocystis – type locality for genus
  - †Kirkocystis papillata – type locality for species
- †Kitakamithyris
  - †Kitakamithyris cooperensis
- †Klausipollenites
  - †Klausipollenites aequus
  - †Klausipollenites schaubergeri
- †Knightites
  - †Knightites montfortianum
- †Knightoceras
  - †Knightoceras patulum
- †Kockelella
  - †Kockelella amsdeni
  - †Kockelella crassa
  - †Kockelella ortus
  - †Kockelella patula
  - †Kockelella ranuliformis
  - †Kockelella stauros
  - †Kockelella variabilis
  - †Kockelella walliseri
- †Kosovopeltis
- †Kozlowskia
  - †Kozlowskia splendens
- †Kozlowskiellina
  - †Kozlowskiellina vaningeni
- †Krausella
  - †Krausella arcuata
- †Krotovia
- †Kukalova – type locality for genus
  - †Kukalova americana – type locality for species

== L ==
- †Labidosaurikos – type locality for genus
  - †Labidosaurikos meachami – type locality for species
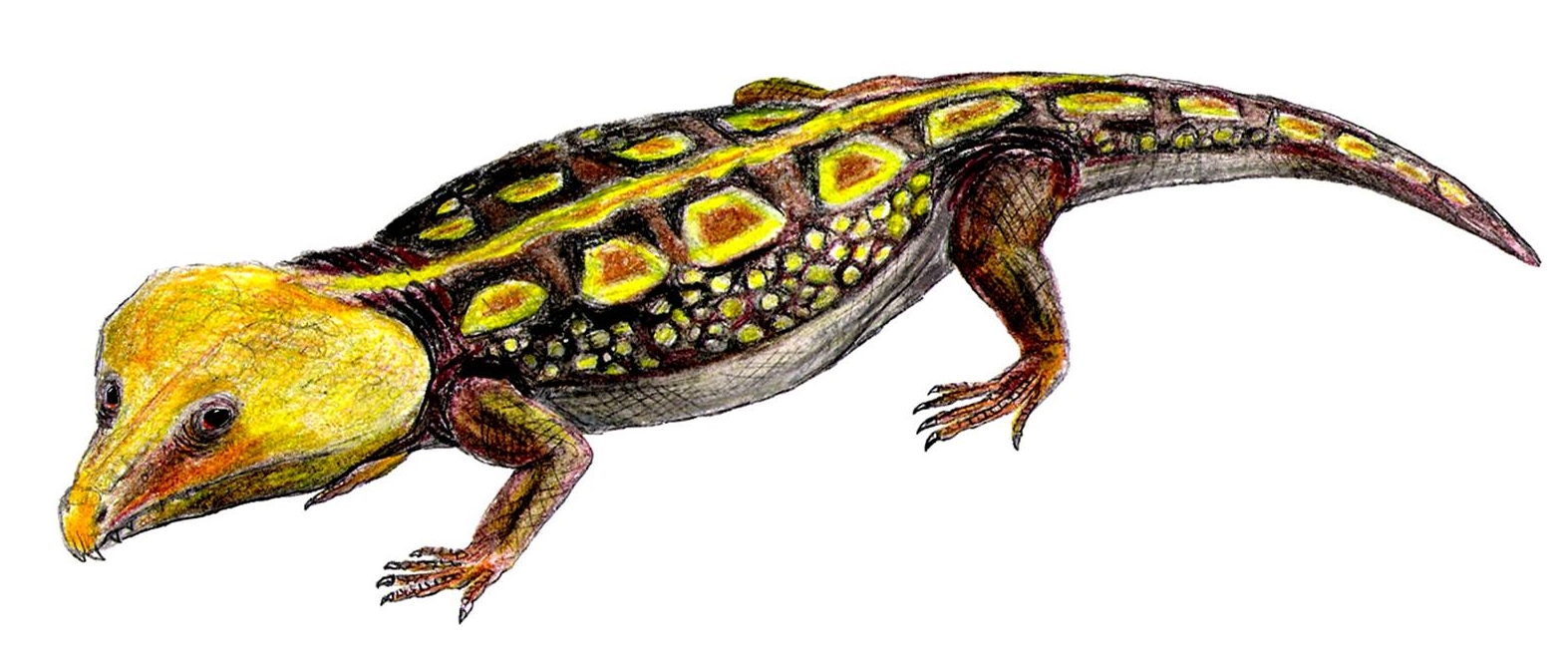
- Life restoration of the Permian reptile Labidosaurus
  †Labidosaurus
- †Labiisporites
  - †Labiisporites granulatus
- †Laeviatosporites
  - †Laeviatosporites ovalis
- Laevidentalium
  - †Laevidentalium venustum – or unidentified comparable form
- †Laevigatosporites
  - †Laevigatosporites desmoinesensis
  - †Laevigatosporites globosus
  - †Laevigatosporites medius
  - †Laevigatosporites ovalis
  - †Laevigatosporites striatus
  - †Laevigatosporites vulgaris
- †Lamellosathyris
  - †Lamellosathyris lamellosa
- †Lampterocrinus
  - †Lampterocrinus fatigatus
- †Lasanocrinus
  - †Lasanocrinus daileyi
  - †Lasanocrinus minutus – type locality for species
  - †Lasanocrinus multinodulus – type locality for species
  - †Lasanocrinus nodatus – type locality for species
  - †Lasanocrinus nodus – type locality for species
  - †Lasanocrinus strigosus
- †Latosporites
  - †Latosporites minutus
- †Leangella
  - †Leangella dissiticostella
- †Lecanocrinus
  - †Lecanocrinus erectus
- †Lecythiocrinus
  - †Lecythiocrinus asymmetricus – type locality for species
- †Leioclema
  - †Leioclema dozierense
  - †Leioclema pushmatahensis – type locality for species
- †Leiovalia
  - †Leiovalia scaberula
  - †Leiovalia teretis
- †Lemmatophora
  - †Lemmatophora typa
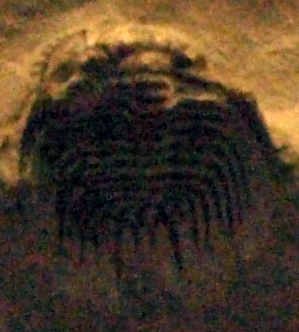
- Fossil of the Late Ordovician-Middle Devonian trilobite Leonaspis
  †Leonaspis
  - †Leonaspis williamsi
- †Lepadocystites
  - †Lepadocystites moorei – tentative report
- †Leperditella
  - †Leperditella aequilatera
  - †Leperditella altiforma
  - †Leperditella deckeri
  - †Leperditella incisa
  - †Leperditella jonesinoides
  - †Leperditella minima
  - †Leperditella porosa
  - †Leperditella rex
  - †Leperditella tumida
- †Leperditia
- †Lepidocoelus
- †Lepidocyclus
  - †Lepidocyclus cooperi
  - †Lepidocyclus manniensis – tentative report
  - †Lepidocyclus oblongus
  - †Lepidocyclus perlamellosus
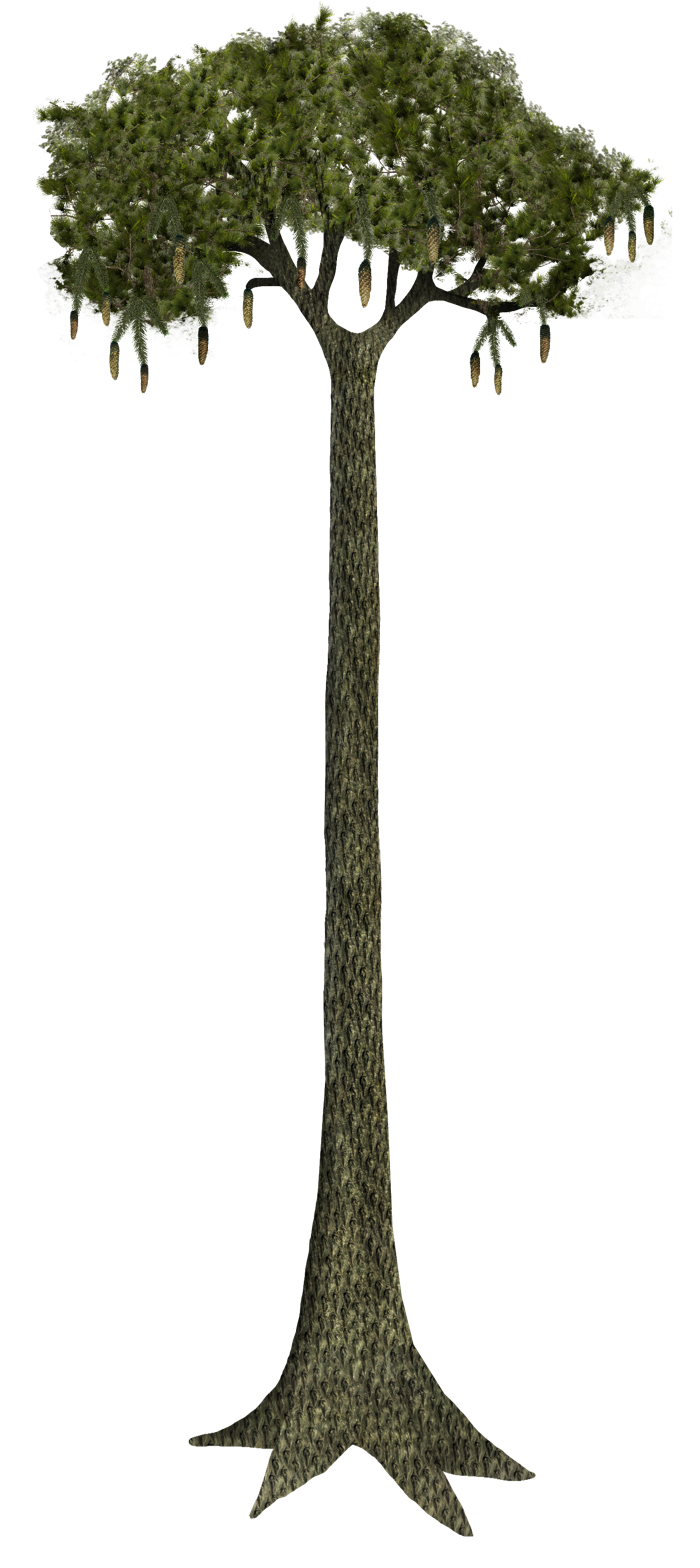
- Life restoration of the Carboniferous tree-sized club moss relative Lepidodendron
  †Lepidodendron
  - †Lepidodendron hickii
- †Lepidophloios
  - †Lepidophloios hallii/johnsonii
- †Leptaena
  - †Leptaena acuticuspidata – type locality for species
  - †Leptaena oklahomensis – type locality for species
- †Leptaenisca
  - †Leptaenisca concava
  - †Leptaenisca irregularis
- †Leptagonia
  - †Leptagonia analoga
- †Leptochirognathus
  - †Leptochirognathus extensa
- †Leptodesma
  - †Leptodesma gouldii – type locality for species
  - †Leptodesma matheri – type locality for species
  - †Leptodesma stenzeli – type locality for species
- †Leptoskelidion – tentative report
  - †Leptoskelidion septulosum
- †Leptostrophia
  - †Leptostrophia beckii
- †Levenea
  - †Levenea subcarinata
- †Ligogramma – type locality for genus
  - †Ligogramma sinuosa – type locality for species
  - †Ligogramma wichita – type locality for species
- †Limipecten
  - †Limipecten newelli – type locality for species
- †Lindosroemella
  - †Lindosroemella patula – or unidentified comparable form
- †Lindostoemella
  - †Lindostoemella patula – or unidentified comparable form
- †Lindostroemella
  - †Lindostroemella patula – or unidentified comparable form
- Lingula
  - †Lingula carbonaria – or unidentified comparable form
  - †Lingula eva
  - †Lingula paracletus – or unidentified comparable form
- †Lingulasma
  - †Lingulasma oklahomense
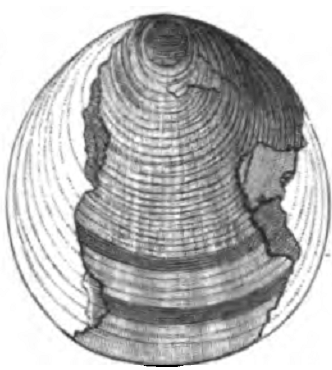
- Illustration of a fossilized shell of the Cambrian-Late Ordovician brachiopod Lingulella
  †Lingulella
  - †Lingulella galba
  - †Lingulella glypta
- †Linoproductus
  - †Linoproductus delawarii – type locality for species
  - †Linoproductus ovatus
  - †Linoproductus prattenianus
- †Liomolgocrinus
- †Liomopterella
  - †Liomopterella pediaecetae – type locality for species
- †Liomopterum
  - †Liomopterum ornatum
- †Liospira
- †Liroceras
  - †Liroceras liratum
- †Lisca
  - †Lisca minuta
- †Lissatrypa
  - †Lissatrypa clairensis
  - †Lissatrypa concentrica
  - †Lissatrypa decaturensis
  - †Lissatrypa henryhousensis
  - †Lissatrypa parvula
- †Lissostrophia
  - †Lissostrophia cooperi
  - †Lissostrophia lindenensis
  - †Lissostrophia lindensis
- Lithophaga
- Lituotuba
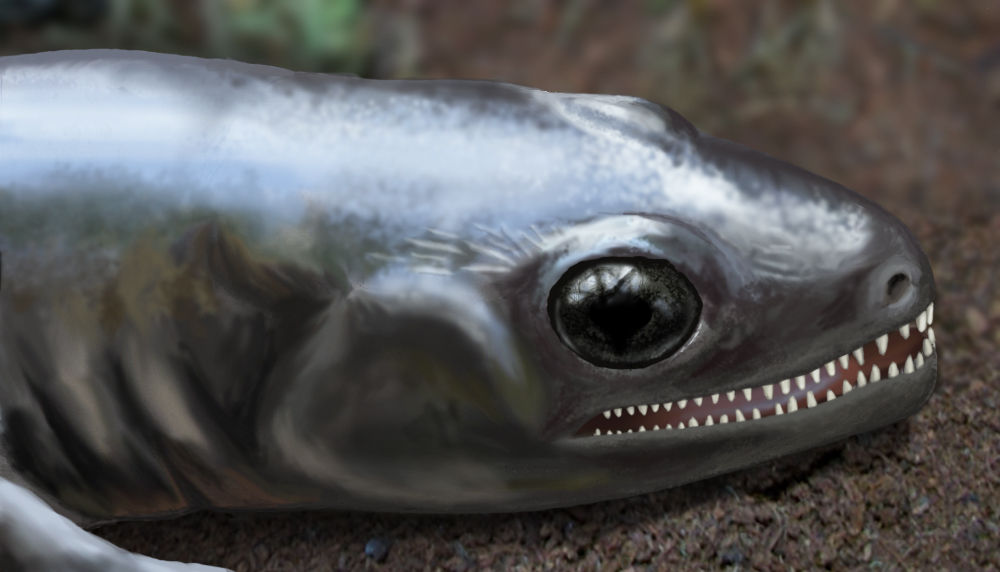
- Life restoration of the Permian amphibian Llistrofus
  †Llistrofus – type locality for genus
  - †Llistrofus pricei – type locality for species
- †Lonchodomas
  - †Lonchodomas mcgeheei
- †Lonchodus
- †Lophamplexus
  - †Lophamplexus brevifolius – type locality for species
  - †Lophamplexus lutarius – type locality for species
  - †Lophamplexus spanius – type locality for species
  - †Lophamplexus vagus – type locality for species
- †Lophophyllidium
  - †Lophophyllidium asarcum – type locality for species
  - †Lophophyllidium compressum – type locality for species
  - †Lophophyllidium hadrum
  - †Lophophyllidium profundum
  - †Lophophyllidium wewokanum – type locality for species
- †Lophophyllum
- †Lophospira
- †Lophotichium
  - †Lophotichium amoenum
- †Lophotriletes
  - †Lophotriletes commissuralis
  - †Lophotriletes ibrahimii
  - †Lophotriletes microsaetosus
  - †Lophotriletes pseudaculeatus
  - †Lophotriletes rarispinosus
- †Lophpophyllum
  - †Lophpophyllum profundum – or unidentified comparable form
- †Loxoedischia – type locality for genus
  - †Loxoedischia drewi – type locality for species
- †Lueckisporites
  - †Lueckisporites fimbriatus
  - †Lueckisporites virkkiae
- †Lunaferamita
  - †Lunaferamita bassleri
  - †Lunaferamita virginiensis
- †Lundbladispora
- †Lunulasporites – type locality for genus
  - †Lunulasporites vulgaris – type locality for species
- †Lutesvillia
  - †Lutesvillia bispinosa
- †Lycospora
  - †Lycospora granulata
  - †Lycospora micropapillata
  - †Lycospora pellucida
  - †Lycospora pusilla
  - †Lycospora rotuda
  - †Lycospora rotunda
- †Lyroschizodus
  - †Lyroschizodus oklahomensis – type locality for species
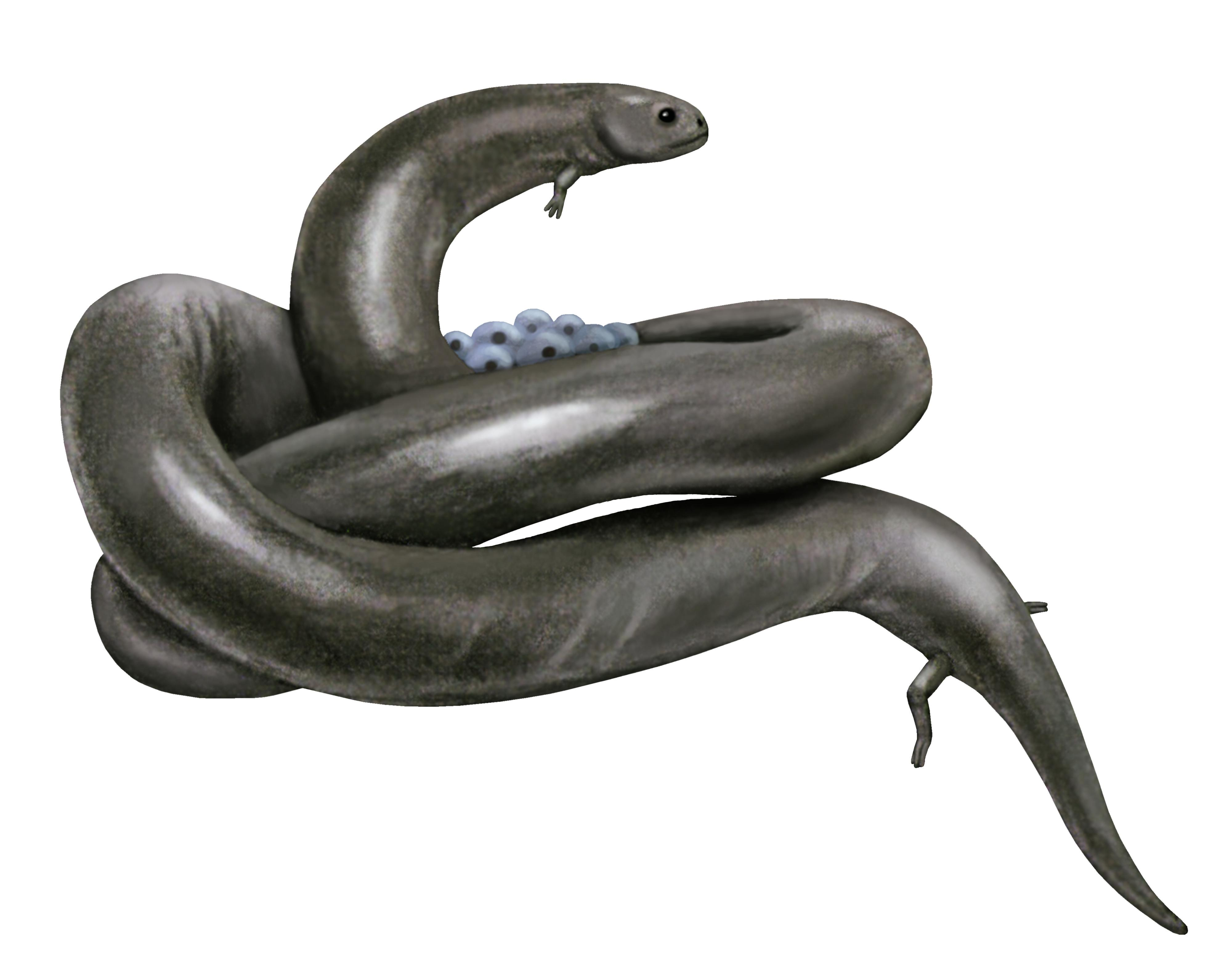
- Life restoration of the Permian snake-like amphibian Lysorophus showing speculative egg-coiling behavior
  †Lysorophus
  - †Lysorophus tricarinatus

== M ==
- †Maclurites
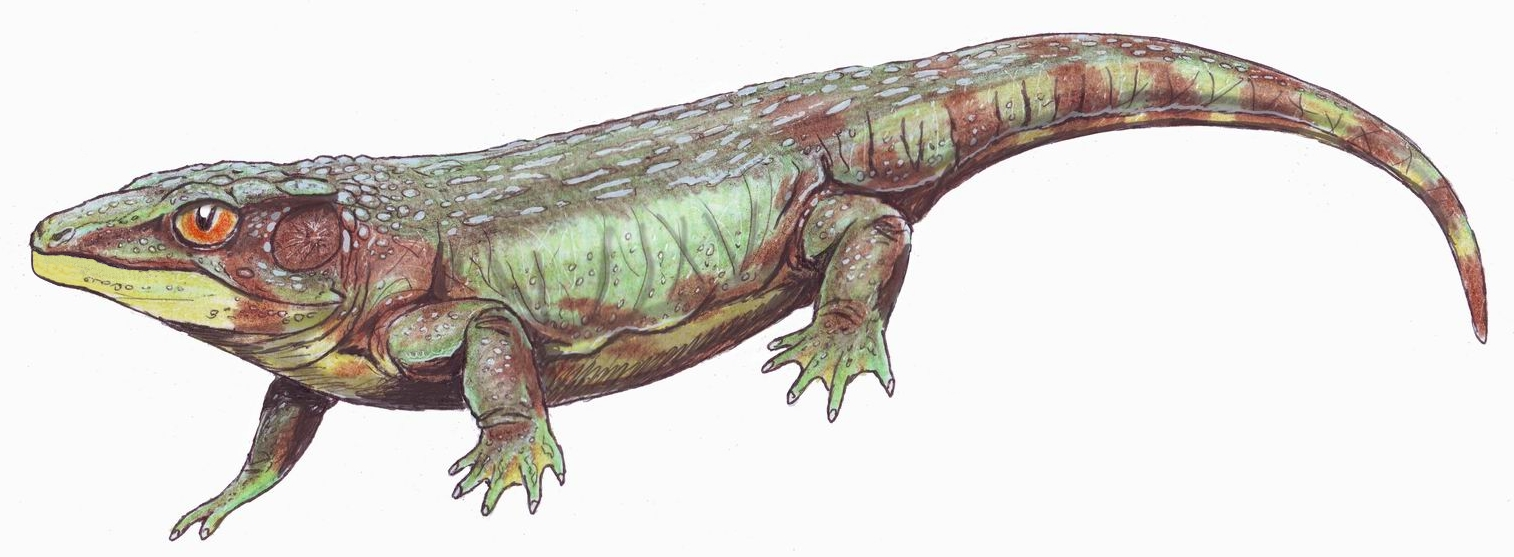
- Life restoration of the Permian primitive reptile Macroleter
  †Macroleter
  - †Macroleter agilis – type locality for species
- †Macropotamorhynchus
  - †Macropotamorhynchus tuta
- †Macrostylocrinus
  - †Macrostylocrinus striatus
- †Mandalocystis – type locality for genus
  - †Mandalocystis dockeryi – type locality for species
- †Manespira
  - †Manespira costata
  - †Manespira elongata
  - †Manespira magnicostata
- †Marginatia
  - †Marginatia magna
- †Marginifera
- †Marginovatia
  - †Marginovatia manardensis
  - †Marginovatia minor
  - †Marginovatia pumila
- †Mariopteris
  - †Mariopteris nervosa
  - †Mariopteris occidentalis
- †Marsupiocrinus
  - †Marsupiocrinus stellatus
- †Marsupipollenites
  - †Marsupipollenites striatus
- †Martynovia
  - †Martynovia halli – type locality for species
  - †Martynovia longipennis – type locality for species
- †Mastigograptus
- †Matonisporites
- †Maurotarion
  - †Maurotarion axitiosum
- †Maximites
  - †Maximites oklahomensis – type locality for species
- †Mcqueenoceras
- †Meekella
  - †Meekella striatocostata
- †Meekopinna
- †Meekopora
- †Meekospira
  - †Meekospira choctawensis
  - †Meekospira peracuta
- †Megactenopetalus
  - †Megactenopetalus kaibabanus
- †Megaglossoceras
- †Megakozlowskiella
  - †Megakozlowskiella velata
- †Megaliocrinus
  - †Megaliocrinus aplatus
- †Megamyonia
  - †Megamyonia mankini
- †Meganeuropsis
  - †Meganeuropsis americana – type locality for species
- †Merista
  - †Merista oklahomensis
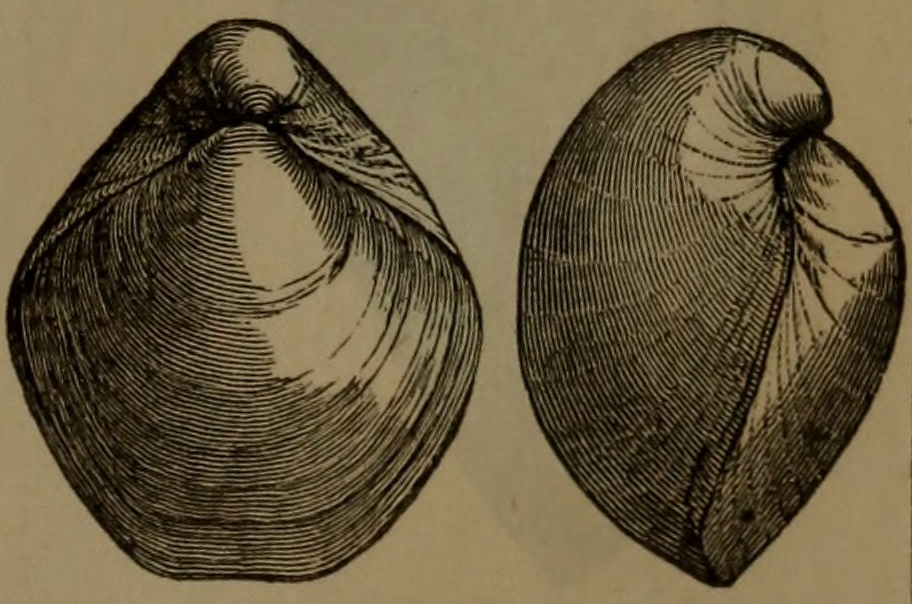
- Illustration (lower right, entry 15) of a fossilized shell in front and side views of the Silurian-Late Devonian brachiopod Meristella
  †Meristella
  - †Meristella atoka
- †Meristina
  - †Meristina claritensis
  - †Meristina roemeri
- †Mescalites
  - †Mescalites discoidalis
- †Mesolobus
- †Mesotrypa
  - †Mesotrypa angularis
  - †Mesotrypa favosa
  - †Mesotrypa tubulifera
- †Mesoxylon
- †Metachorus
  - †Metachorus striolatus – type locality for species
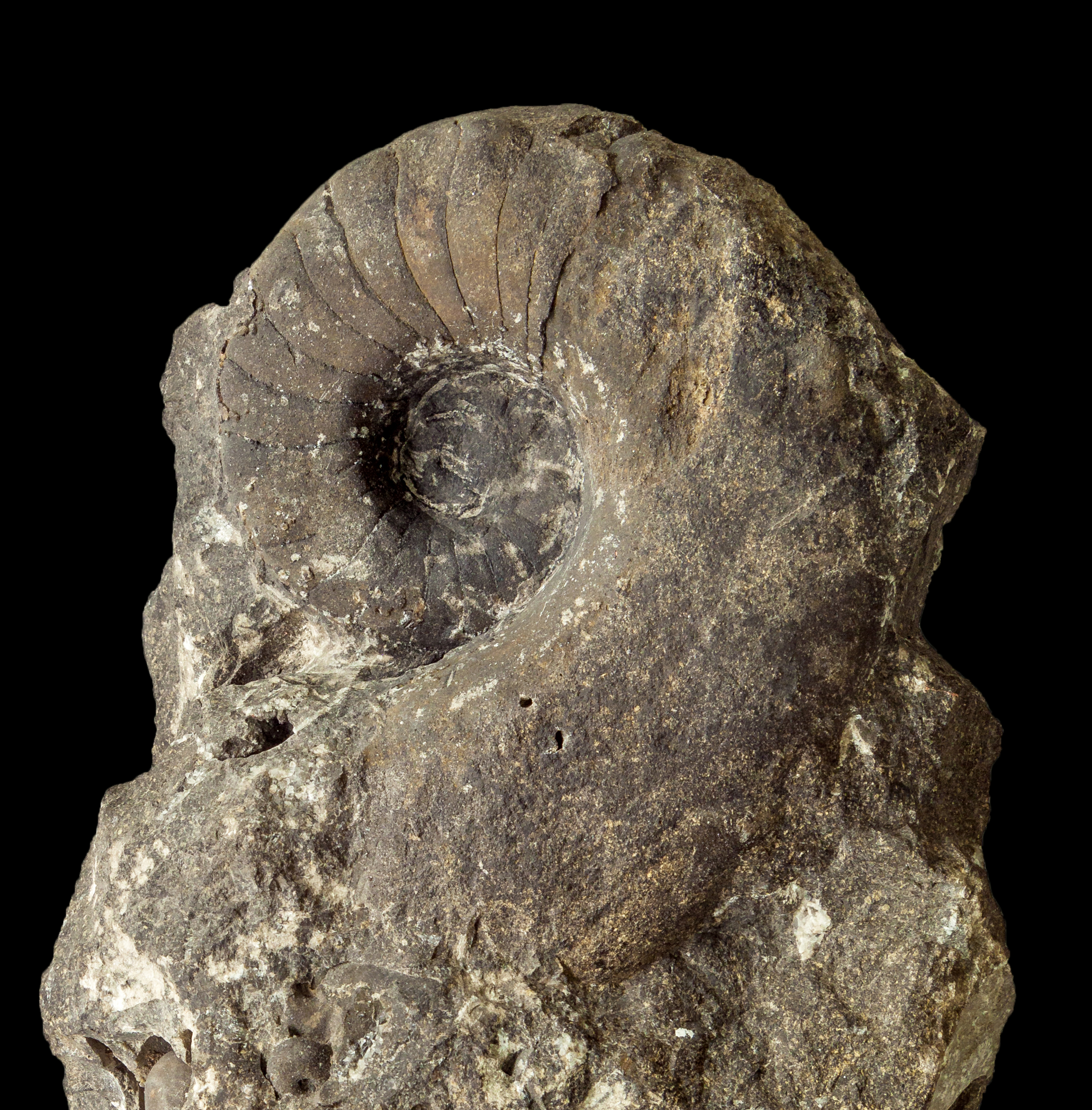
- Fossilized shell of the Carboniferous-Permian nautiloid cephalopod Metacoceras
  †Metacoceras
  - †Metacoceras cornutum
  - †Metacoceras sinuosum
  - †Metacoceras vagans – type locality for species
- †Metaconularia
- †Metacromyocrinus
  - †Metacromyocrinus fundundus – type locality for species
  - †Metacromyocrinus papulosus
- †Metutharocrinus
  - †Metutharocrinus cockei
  - †Metutharocrinus spinifer – type locality for species
  - †Metutharocrinus undulatus – type locality for species
- †Michelinia
  - †Michelinia meekana
- †Michelinoceras
  - †Michelinoceras directum
  - †Michelinoceras wapanuckense
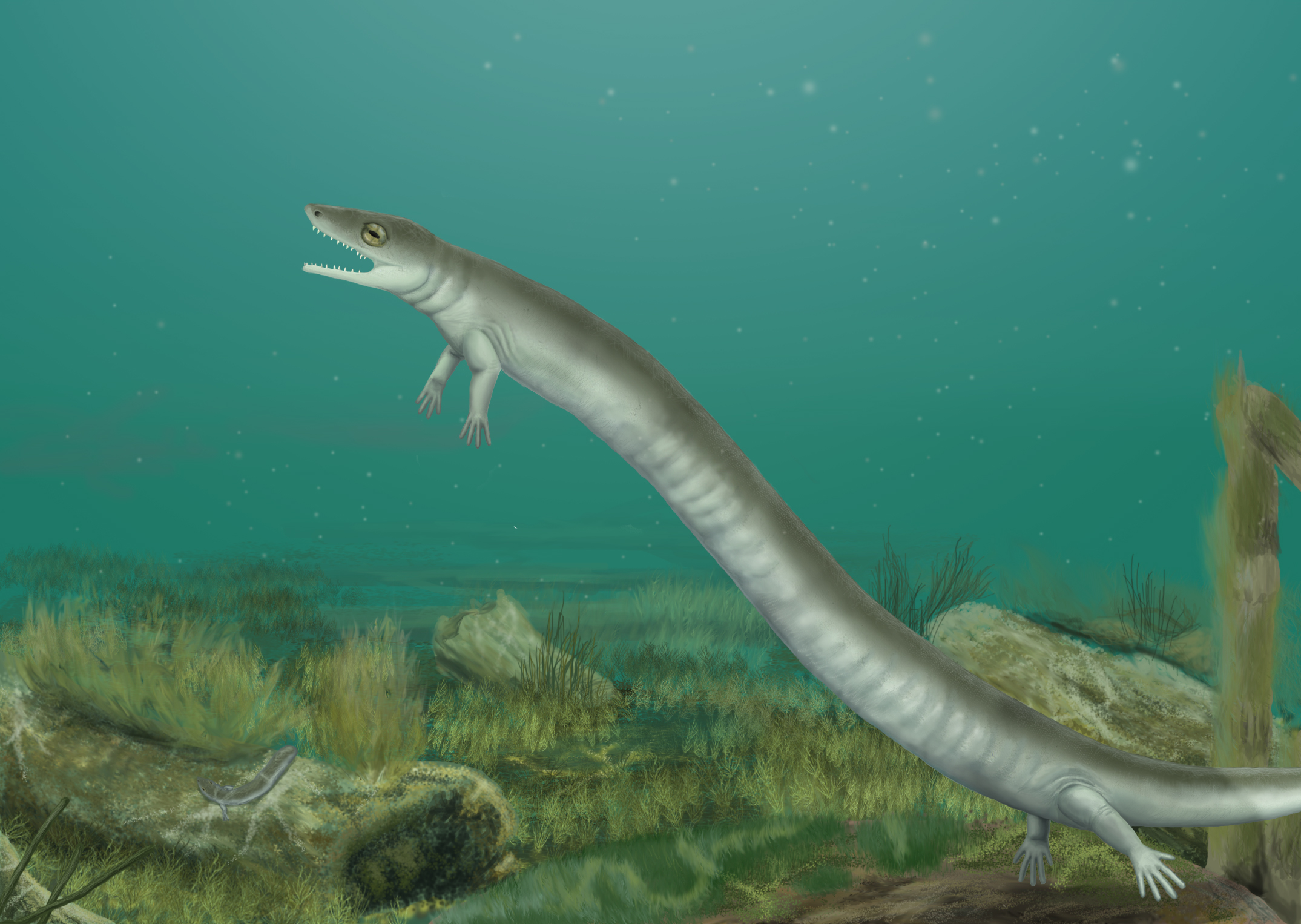
- Life restoration of the Permian amphibian Micraroter
  †Micraroter – type locality for genus
  - †Micraroter erythrogeios – type locality for species
- †Microcaracrinus
  - †Microcaracrinus delicatus
- †Microcoelodus
  - †Microcoelodus asymmetricus
  - †Microcoelodus inornatus
  - †Microcoelodus intermedius
  - †Microcoelodus minutidentatus
  - †Microcoelodus typus
- †Microleter – type locality for genus
  - †Microleter mckinzieorum – type locality for species
- †Microreticulatisporites
  - †Microreticulatisporites nobilis
  - †Microreticulatisporites sulcatus
- †Microschmidtella
  - †Microschmidtella berdanae – type locality for species
  - †Microschmidtella hami – type locality for species
- †Microspermopteris
  - †Microspermopteris aphyllum
- †Micula – tentative report
- †Midcopterum – type locality for genus
  - †Midcopterum evidens – type locality for species
- †Mimella
  - †Mimella extensa
  - †Mimella subquadrata
- †Misthodotes
  - †Misthodotes edmundsi – type locality for species
  - †Misthodotes ovalis
- †Mitorthoceras
  - †Mitorthoceras crebriliratum – type locality for species
  - †Mitorthoceras perfilosum
- †Modiolopsis – tentative report
- Modiolus
- †Monoceratella
  - †Monoceratella brevispinata
- †Monoceratina
  - †Monoceratina ardmorensis
  - †Monoceratina ventralis
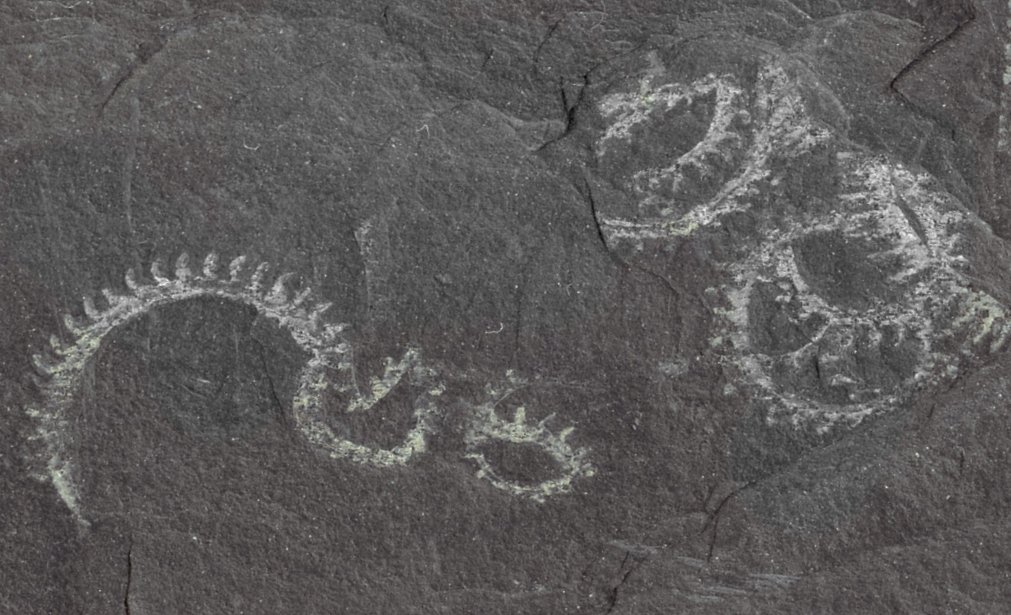
- Fossils of the Early Devonian graptolite Monograptus
  †Monograptus
- †Monticuliporella
  - †Monticuliporella croneisi
  - †Monticuliporella peculiaris
  - †Monticuliporella shideleri
- †Mooreina
  - †Mooreina johnsvalleyensis – type locality for species
- †Mooreisporites
  - †Mooreisporites inusitatus
- †Mooreoceras
- †Moorites
- †Moravia
  - †Moravia grandis – type locality for species
- †Moundocrinus
  - †Moundocrinus coalensis – type locality for species
- †Mucrosaccus
  - †Mucrosaccus alatus – type locality for species
- †Multicostella
  - †Multicostella convexa
  - †Multicostella sulcata
- †Multidentodus – type locality for genus
  - †Multidentodus brevis – type locality for species
  - †Multidentodus gracilis – type locality for species
  - †Multidentodus irregularis – type locality for species
  - †Multidentodus johnsvalleyensis – type locality for species
  - †Multidentodus typicus – type locality for species
  - †Multidentodus wapanuckensis – type locality for species
- †Murinella
  - †Murinella partita
- †Murospora
  - †Murospora kosankei
- †Myalina
  - †Myalina lepta
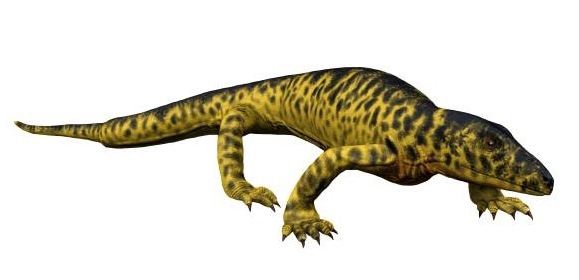
- Life restoration of the Permian synapsid (mammal precursor) Mycterosaurus
  †Mycterosaurus – type locality for genus
  - †Mycterosaurus longiceps – type locality for species
- †Myeinocystites
  - †Myeinocystites natus
- †Myelodactylus

== N ==
- †Nanicrinus
  - †Nanicrinus papillatus
- †Nannaroter – type locality for genus
  - †Nannaroter mckinziei – type locality for species
- †Nannospondylus – type locality for genus
  - †Nannospondylus stewarti – type locality for species
- †Naticonema
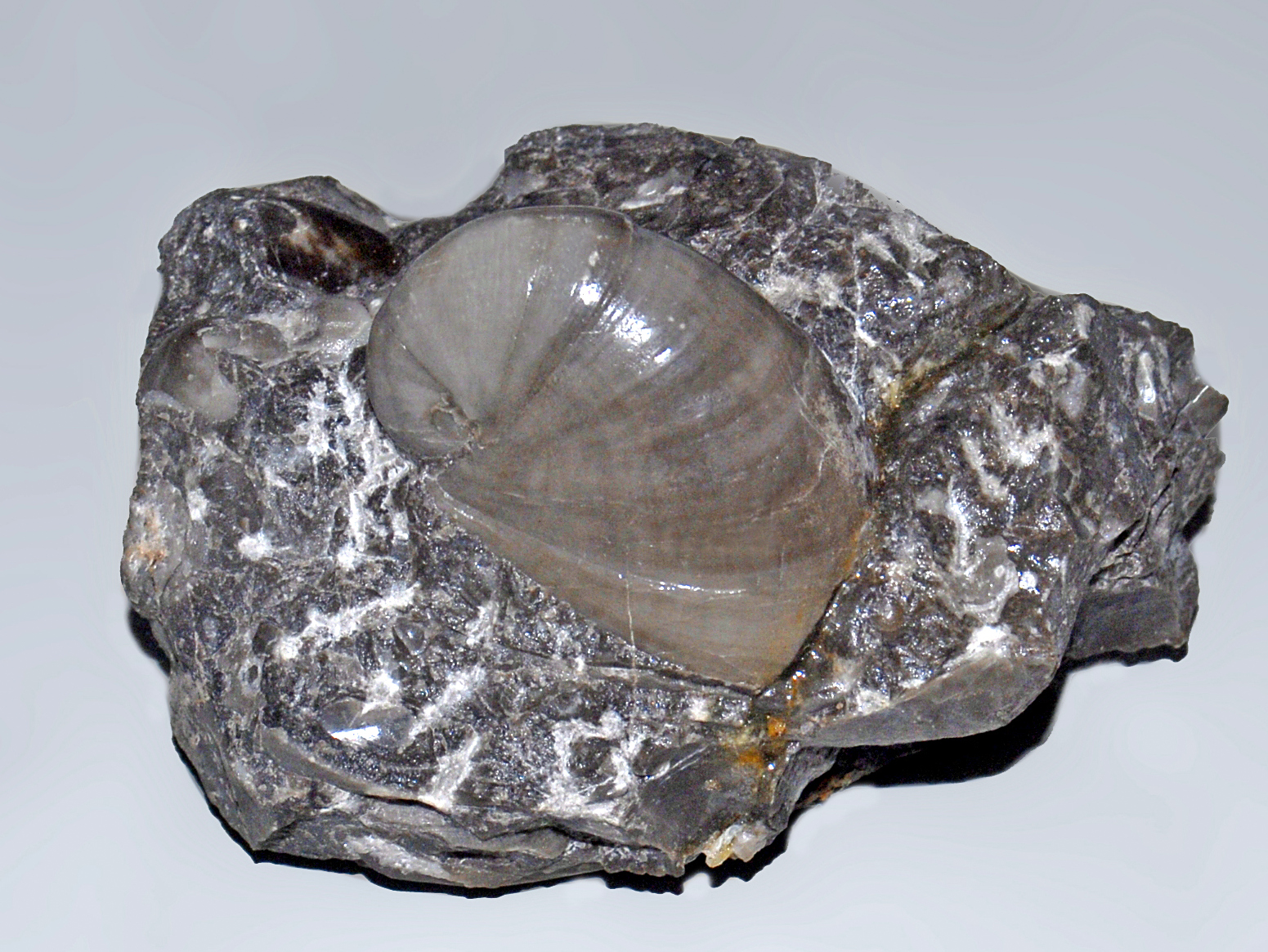
- Fossilized shell of the Early Devonian – Triassic sea snail Naticopsis
  †Naticopsis
  - †Naticopsis transversa – type locality for species
- †Navispira
  - †Navispira saffordi
- †Neoarchaeocrinus
  - †Neoarchaeocrinus necopinus
- †Neochonetes
  - †Neochonetes granulifer
- †Neodimorphoceras
  - †Neodimorphoceras oklahomae
- †Neoglyphioceras
  - †Neoglyphioceras caneyanum – type locality for species
- †Neoisorophusella
  - †Neoisorophusella whitesidei – type locality for species
- †Neokoninckophyllum
  - †Neokoninckophyllum acolumnatum
  - †Neokoninckophyllum tushanense
- †Neoraistrickia
- †Neospirifer
  - †Neospirifer dunbari
- †Neostrophia
  - †Neostrophia gregaria
- †Neothlipsura
  - †Neothlipsura furca
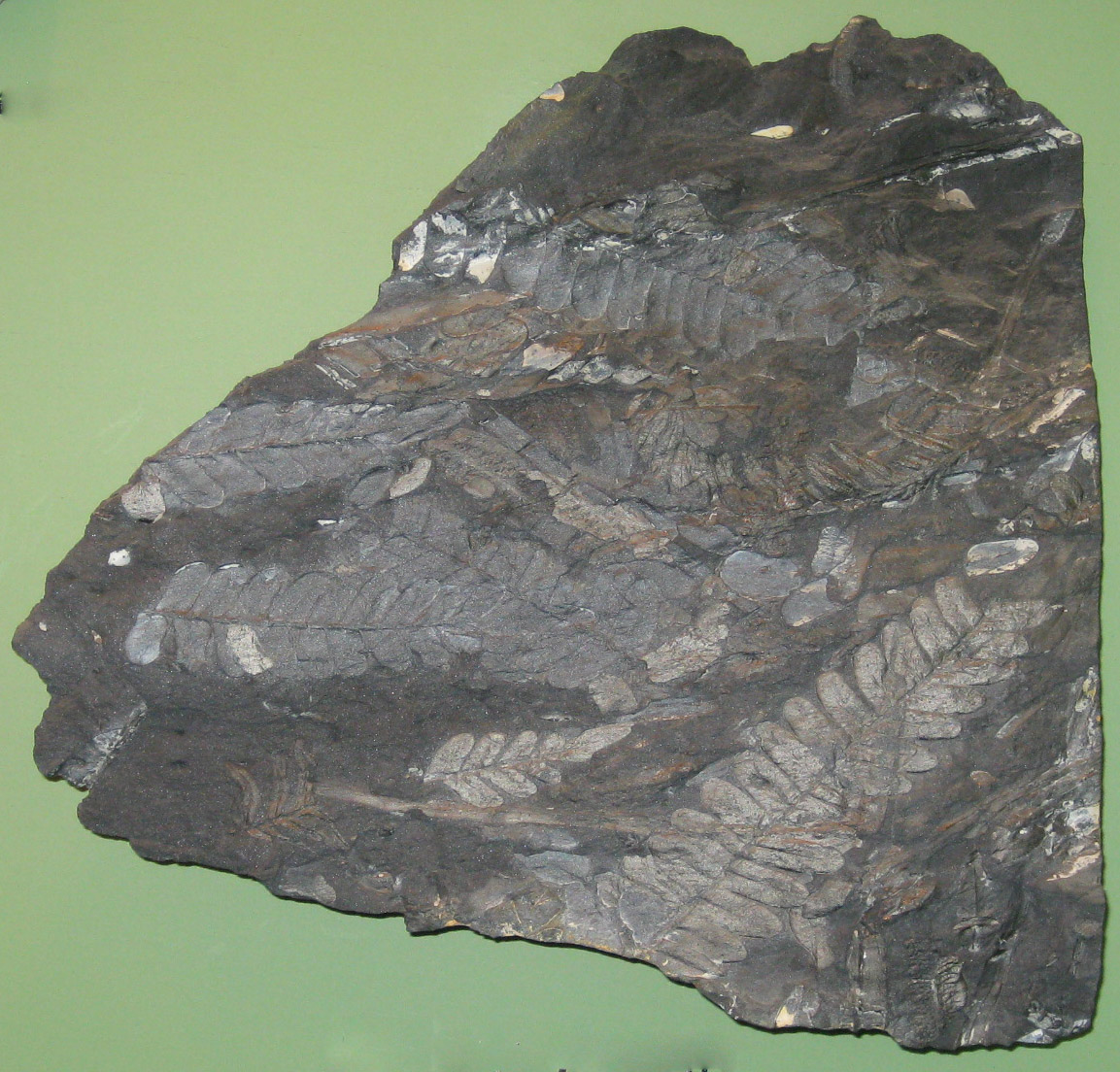
- Fronds of the Carboniferous seed fern Neuropteris
  †Neuropteris
  - †Neuropteris heterophylla
  - †Neuropteris macrophylla
  - †Neuropteris obliqua
  - †Neuropteris osmundae
  - †Neuropteris rarinervis
- †Nicholsonella
  - †Nicholsonella acanthobscura
  - †Nicholsonella irregularis
  - †Nicholsonella laminata
  - †Nicholsonella moniliformis
- †Nobloedischia – type locality for genus
  - †Nobloedischia rasnitsyni – type locality for species
- †Nodosinella
  - †Nodosinella glennensis – type locality for species
- †Nucleospira
  - †Nucleospira concentrica
  - †Nucleospira ventricosa
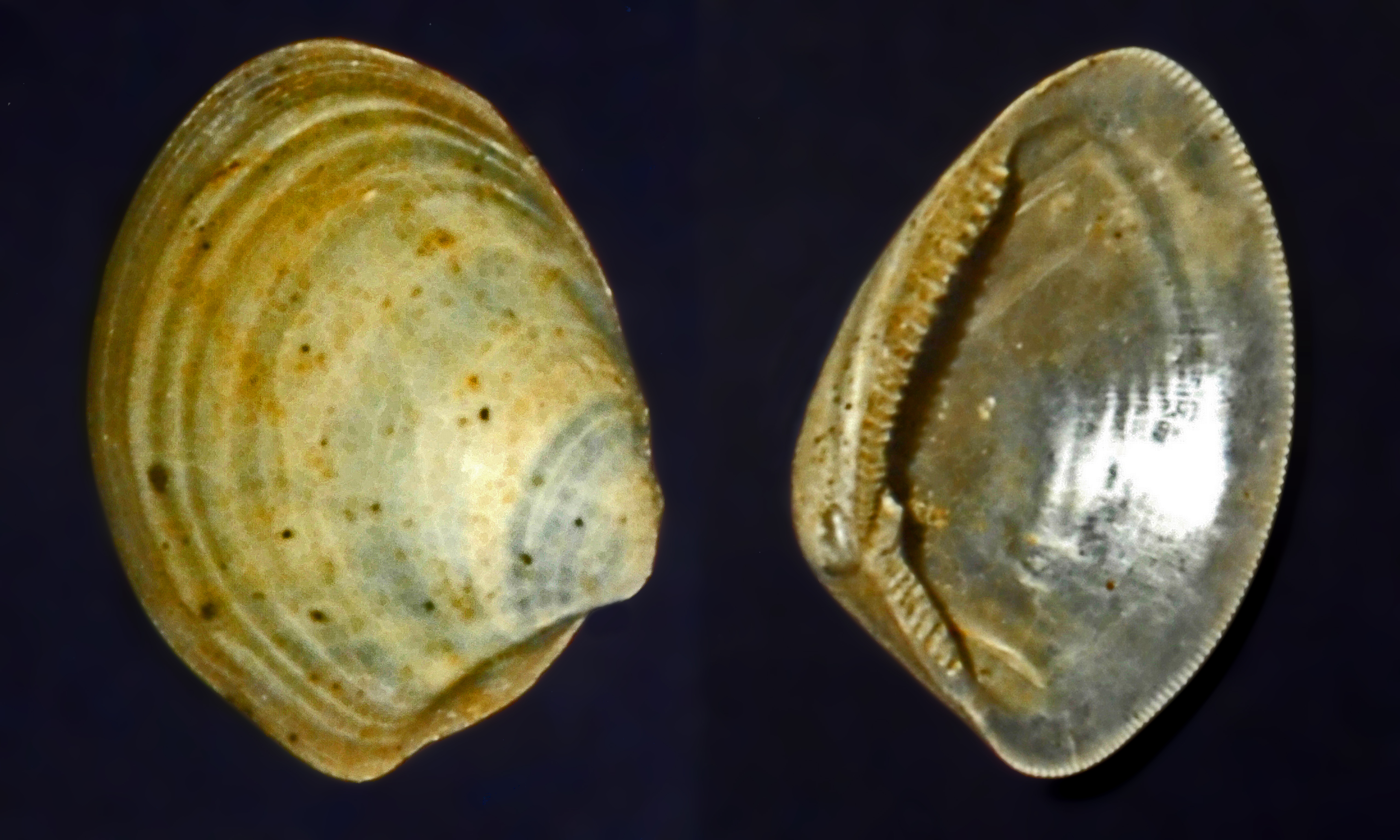
- Interior of a fossilized shell of the Early Ordovician-modern marine bivalve Nucula
  Nucula
- Nuculana
- †Nuculavus
- †Nuculopsis
  - †Nuculopsis girtyi
  - †Nuculopsis subventricosa
  - †Nuculopsis wewoka
  - †Nuculopsis wewokana
- †Nudauris
  - †Nudauris reticulata
- †Nuferella
  - †Nuferella rothi – type locality for species
- †Nummicrinus
  - †Nummicrinus brevis
  - †Nummicrinus papilloseous
- †Nummulostegina
  - †Nummulostegina ardmorensis – type locality for species
- †Nuskoisporites
  - †Nuskoisporites renulatus – type locality for species

== O ==
- †Obturamentella – type locality for genus
  - †Obturamentella wadei
- †Octonaria
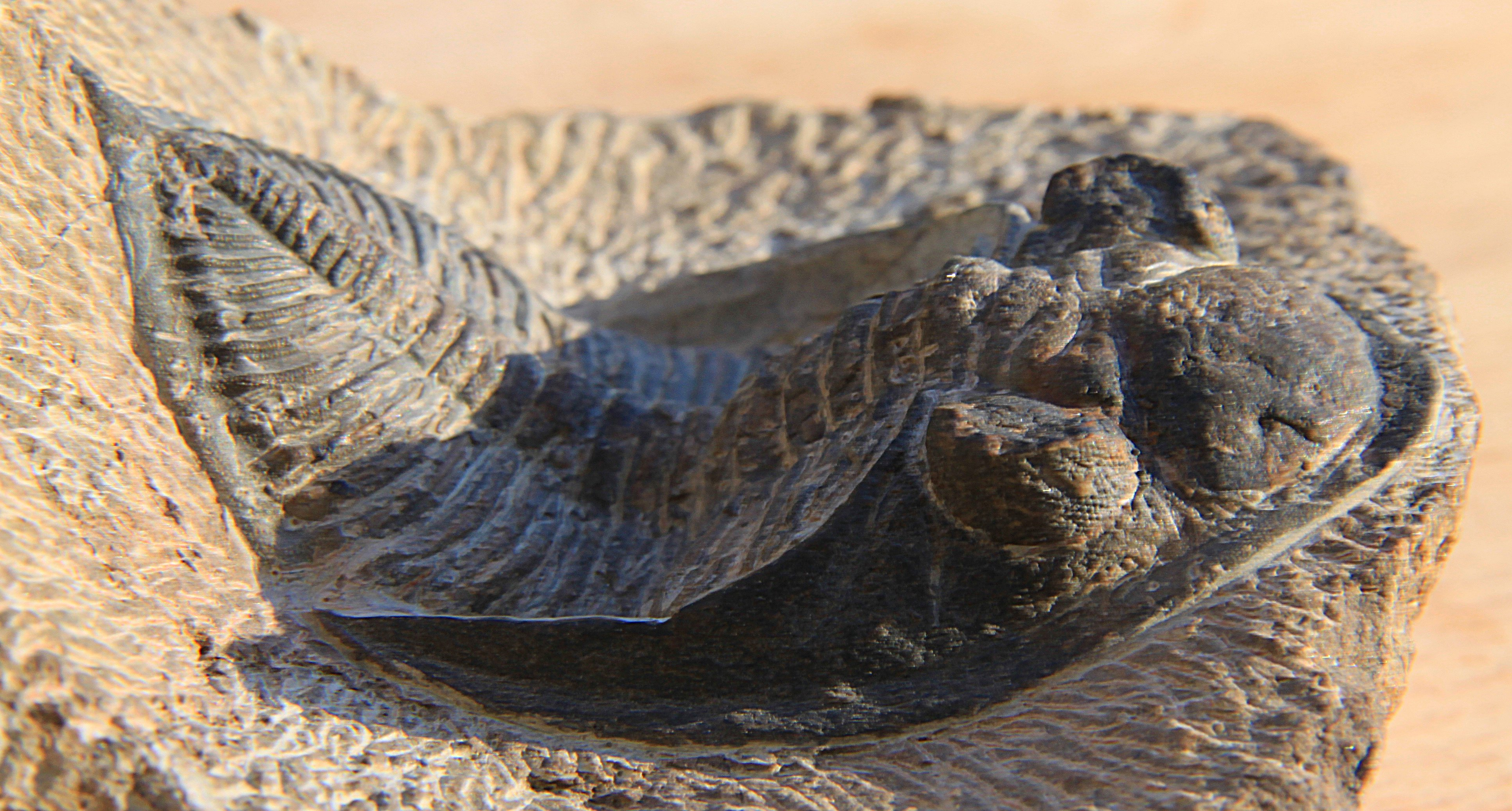
- Fossil of the Silurian-Devonian trilobite Odontochile
  †Odontochile
  - †Odontochile syncrama
  - †Odontochile taffi
- †Odontopteris
  - †Odontopteris permiensis – or unidentified comparable form
- †Oepikina
  - †Oepikina expatiata
  - †Oepikina extensa
  - †Oepikina formosa
  - †Oepikina gregaria
- †Oinochoe
  - †Oinochoe coccymelum – type locality for species
- †Oistodus
  - †Oistodus abundans
  - †Oistodus inclinatus
- †Oklahomacrinus
  - †Oklahomacrinus frostae
- †Oklahomacystis
  - †Oklahomacystis spissus
  - †Oklahomacystis tribrachiatus
- †Oklahomasporites – type locality for genus
  - †Oklahomasporites majori – type locality for species
- †Oligophyllum – or unidentified comparable form
- †Oligotypus
  - †Oligotypus tillyardi
- † Oliveria
- †Oltulocrinus
- †Omphalotrochus
  - †Omphalotrochus wolfcampensis
- †Onniella – tentative report
- †Onychoplecia
  - †Onychoplecia tenuis
- †Onychotreta
  - †Onychotreta multiplicata
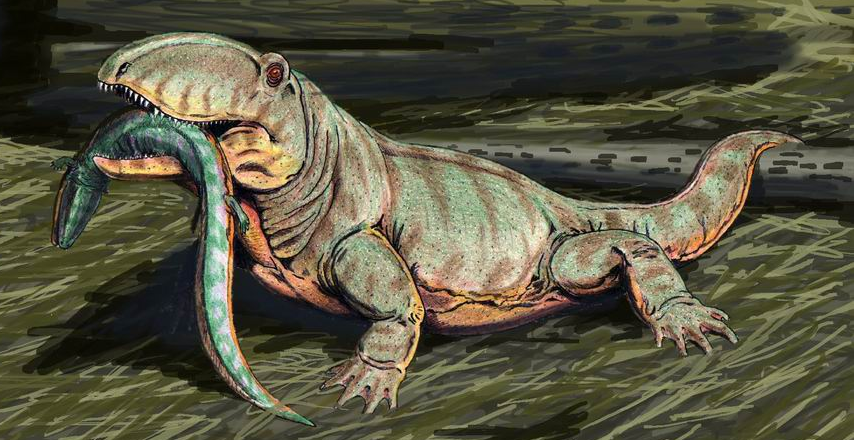
- Life restoration of the Carboniferous-Permian synapsid (mammal precursor) Ophiacodon
  †Ophiacodon
  - †Ophiacodon major
  - †Ophiacodon mirus – or unidentified comparable form
  - †Ophiacodon uniformis
- †Ophiletina
  - †Ophiletina bromidensis – type locality for species
- †Opisthodontosaurus – type locality for genus
  - †Opisthodontosaurus carrolli – type locality for species
- †Orbiculoidea
  - †Orbiculoidea eximia
- †Orbignyella
  - †Orbignyella sublamellosa
- †Orobias
  - †Orobias ciscoensis
- †Oromycter – type locality for genus
  - †Oromycter dolesorum – type locality for species
- †Orovenator – type locality for genus
  - †Orovenator mayorum – type locality for species
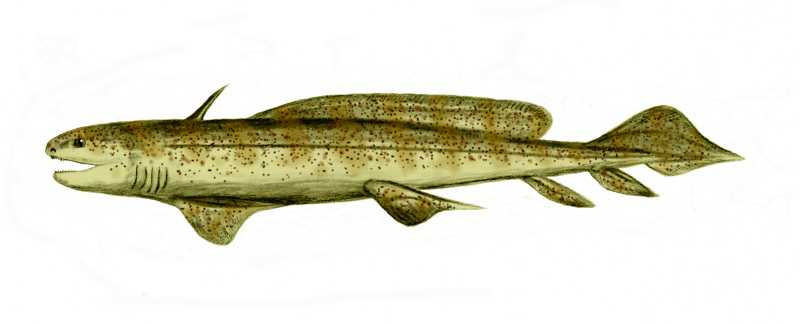
- Life restoration of the Carboniferous-Permian freshwater shark Orthacanthus
  †Orthacanthus
  - †Orthacanthus compressus
- †Orthoceras
- †Orthograptus
  - †Orthograptus eucharis
- †Orthonema
- †Orthosphaeridium
  - †Orthosphaeridium vibrissiferum
- †Orthostrophella
  - †Orthostrophella clairensis
- †Orthostrophia
  - †Orthostrophia brownsportensis – or unidentified comparable form
  - †Orthostrophia strophomenoides
- †Orthotetes
  - †Orthotetes kaskaskiensis
  - †Orthotetes springerensis – type locality for species
- †Otarion
  - †Otarion axitosum – type locality for species
- †Ottonosia
- †Oulodus
  - †Oulodus siluricus
- †Ovatia
  - †Ovatia laevicosta
- †Oxoplecia
  - †Oxoplecia filosa
  - †Oxoplecia gouldi
- †Oxyprora
  - †Oxyprora oklahomaense
  - †Oxyprora sayrei – type locality for species
- †Ozarkodina
  - †Ozarkodina bohemica
  - †Ozarkodina confluens
  - †Ozarkodina crassa
  - †Ozarkodina sagitta

== P ==
- †Pachydictya
  - †Pachydictya bromidensis
  - †Pachydictya sheldonensis
- †Pachydomella
  - †Pachydomella sohni – type locality for species
- †Pachyglossella
  - †Pachyglossella biconvexa
- †Pachylyroceras
  - †Pachylyroceras cloudi
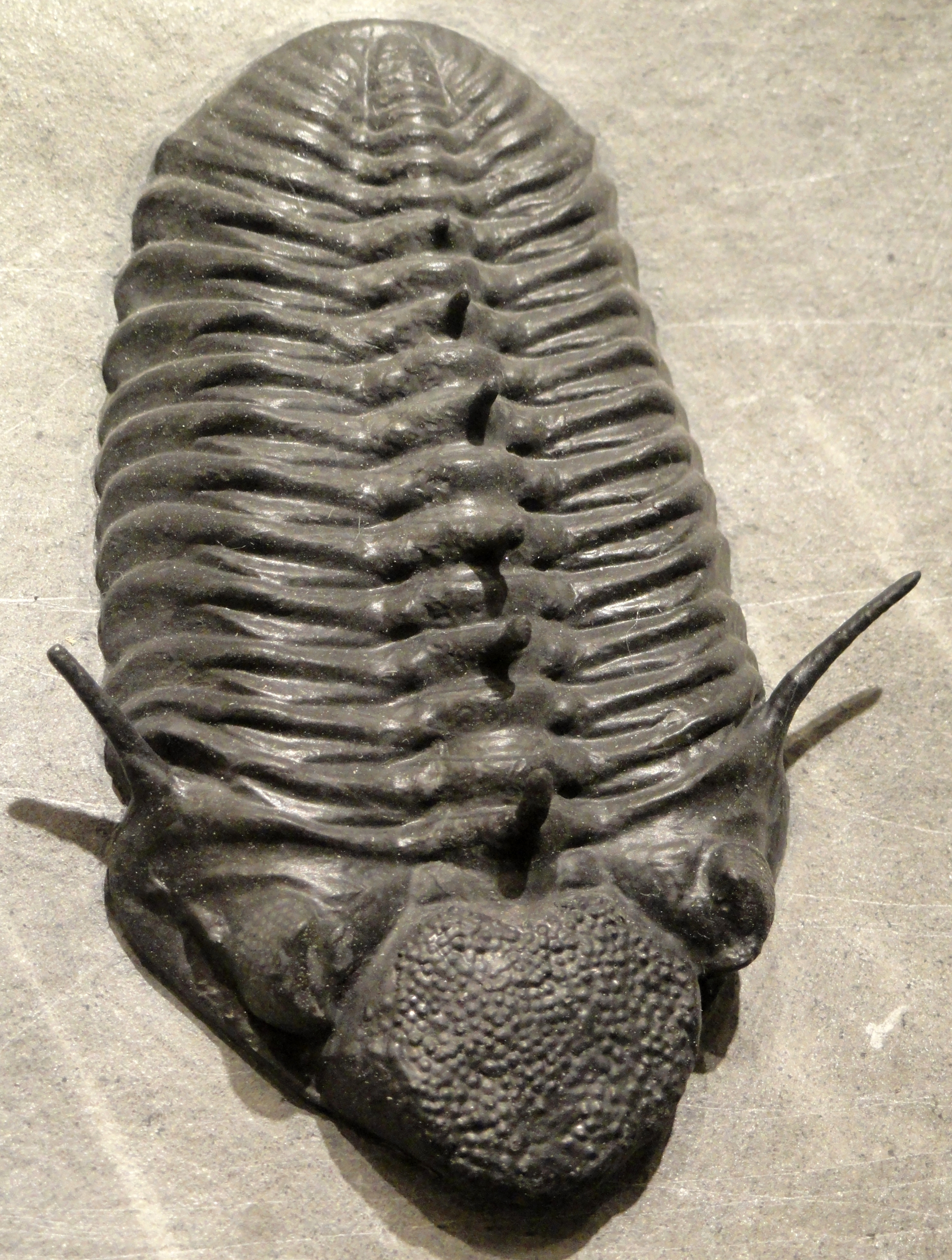
- Fossil of the trilobite Paciphacops
  †Paciphacops
  - †Paciphacops birdsongensis – or unidentified comparable form
  - †Paciphacops campbelli
  - †Paciphacops raymondi
- †Paladin
  - †Paladin morrowensis
  - †Paladin mucronatus – tentative report
- Palaeoaplysina – tentative report
- †Palaeocapulus – tentative report
  - †Palaeocapulus acutirostre – or unidentified comparable form
- †Palaeocrinus
  - †Palaeocrinus hudsoni
- †Palaeocystites – tentative report
- †Palaeolima
  - †Palaeolima inequicostata
- †Palaeoneilo
- †Palaeostylus
- †Palaeotextularia
- †Palaeozygopleura
  - †Palaeozygopleura parva – tentative report
- †Palecocrinus – tentative report
- †Paleochiton
  - †Paleochiton kindbladensis – type locality for species
- †Paleohyperamum – type locality for genus
  - †Paleohyperamum pottsvillensis – type locality for species
- †Paleotextularia
- †Paleuthygramma
  - †Paleuthygramma acuta – type locality for species
- †Paleyoldia
  - †Paleyoldia glabra
- †Palliseria
  - †Palliseria robusta
- †Palmerocrinus
  - †Palmerocrinus profundus – type locality for species
- †Paltodus
  - †Paltodus compressus
- †Pandaspinapyga
  - †Pandaspinapyga salsa
- †Panderodus
  - †Panderodus equicostatus
  - †Panderodus gracilis
  - †Panderodus greenlandensis
  - †Panderodus panderi
  - †Panderodus unicostatus
- †Parabolbina
  - †Parabolbina scotti
- †Paraconularia
- †Paracremacrinus
  - †Paracremacrinus laticardinalis
- †Paracromyocrinus
  - †Paracromyocrinus oklahomensis
  - †Paracromyocrinus planatus – type locality for species
- †Paradiabolocrinus
- †Paraechmina
- †Paragassizocrinus
  - †Paragassizocrinus tarri
- †Parahealdia
  - †Parahealdia quaesita
- †Paralegoceras
  - †Paralegoceras iowense
  - †Paralegoceras textum
- †Parallelodon
  - †Parallelodon vokesi – type locality for species
- †Paramelocrinus
  - †Paramelocrinus ubaghsi
- †Paramphicrinus
- †Paraparchites
  - †Paraparchites circulantis
  - †Paraparchites elongatus – or unidentified comparable form
  - †Paraparchites wapanuckensis
- †Parapermopsylla – type locality for genus
  - †Parapermopsylla tricubita – type locality for species
- †Parapostibulla
  - †Parapostibulla graysoni – type locality for species
- †Paraprisca
  - †Paraprisca fragilis
- †Pararchaeocrinus
  - †Pararchaeocrinus decoratus
- †Parasaccites
  - †Parasaccites korbaenis
- †Paraschmidtella
- †Parastrophinella
  - †Parastrophinella lepida
- †Parazophocrinus
  - †Parazophocrinus callosus
- †Parelmoa – type locality for genus
  - †Parelmoa obtusa – type locality for species
  - †Parelmoa radialis – type locality for species
  - †Parelmoa revelata – type locality for species
- †Parulrichia
  - †Parulrichia haragenensis
- †Pasawioops – type locality for genus
  - †Pasawioops mayi – type locality for species
- †Passalocrinus
- †Paucicrura
  - †Paucicrura oklahomensis
  - †Paucicrura rogata – or unidentified comparable form
- †Paurorthis
  - †Paurorthis macrodeltoidea
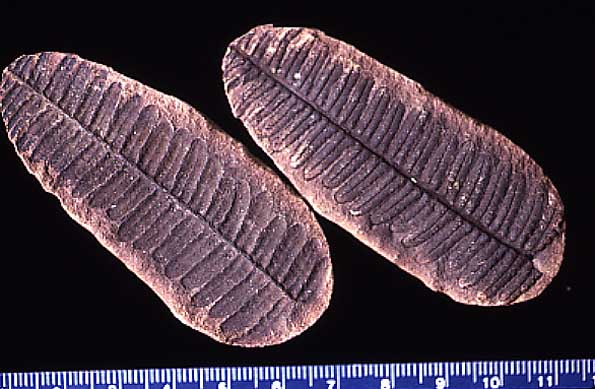
- Fossils of the Late Devonian-Permian fern-like fronds Pecopteris
  †Pecopteris
  - †Pecopteris cyathea
  - †Pecopteris geinitzi
  - †Pecopteris hemitelioides
  - †Pecopteris miltonii
  - †Pecopteris plumosa-dentata – informal
  - †Pecopteris sarefolia
- †Pelidocrinus
  - †Pelidocrinus exiguus
- †Peltabellia
  - †Peltabellia implexa
- †Peltacrinus
  - †Peltacrinus sculptatus
- †Penicillicrinus
- †Penniretepora
  - †Penniretepora ardmorensis – type locality for species
- †Pennsylvanioxylon
- †Pentameroides
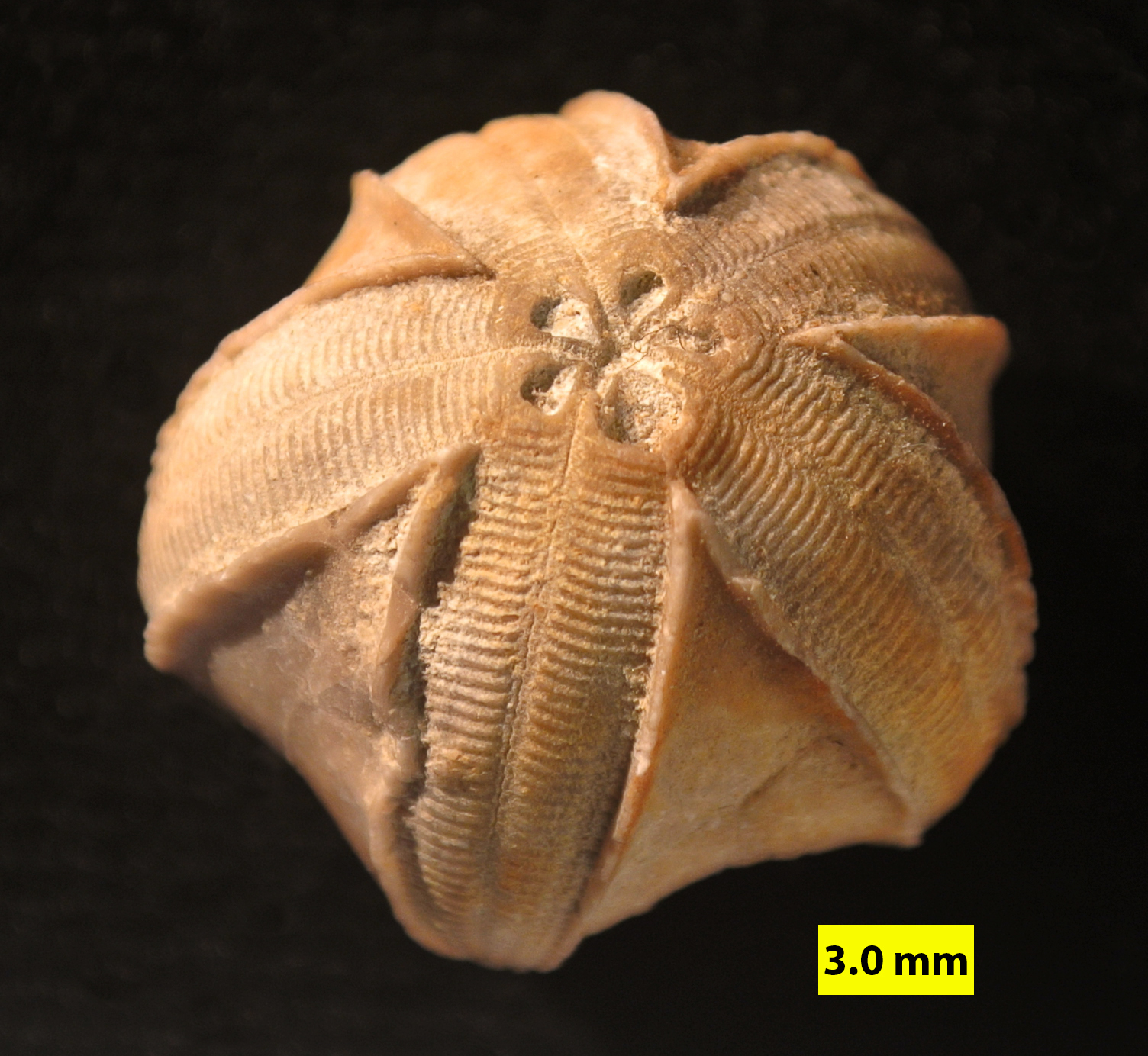
- Fossilized theca of the Carboniferous blastoid echinoderm ("sea bud") Pentremites
  †Pentremites
- †Periglyptocrinus
  - †Periglyptocrinus priscus
- †Perimestocrinus
  - †Perimestocrinus teneris
- †Peripetoceras
- †Permoberotha
  - †Permoberotha villosa – tentative report
- †Permoblattina
  - †Permoblattina curta
- †Permocoleus – type locality for genus
  - †Permocoleus wellingtonensis – type locality for species
- †Permopanorpa
  - †Permopanorpa inaequalis
- †Permophorus
  - †Permophorus albequus
  - †Permophorus immaturis
  - †Permophorus mexicanus
- †Permopsylla
  - †Permopsylla americana – tentative report
- †Perrinites
  - †Perrinites hilli
- †Perryella – type locality for genus
  - †Perryella olsoni – type locality for species
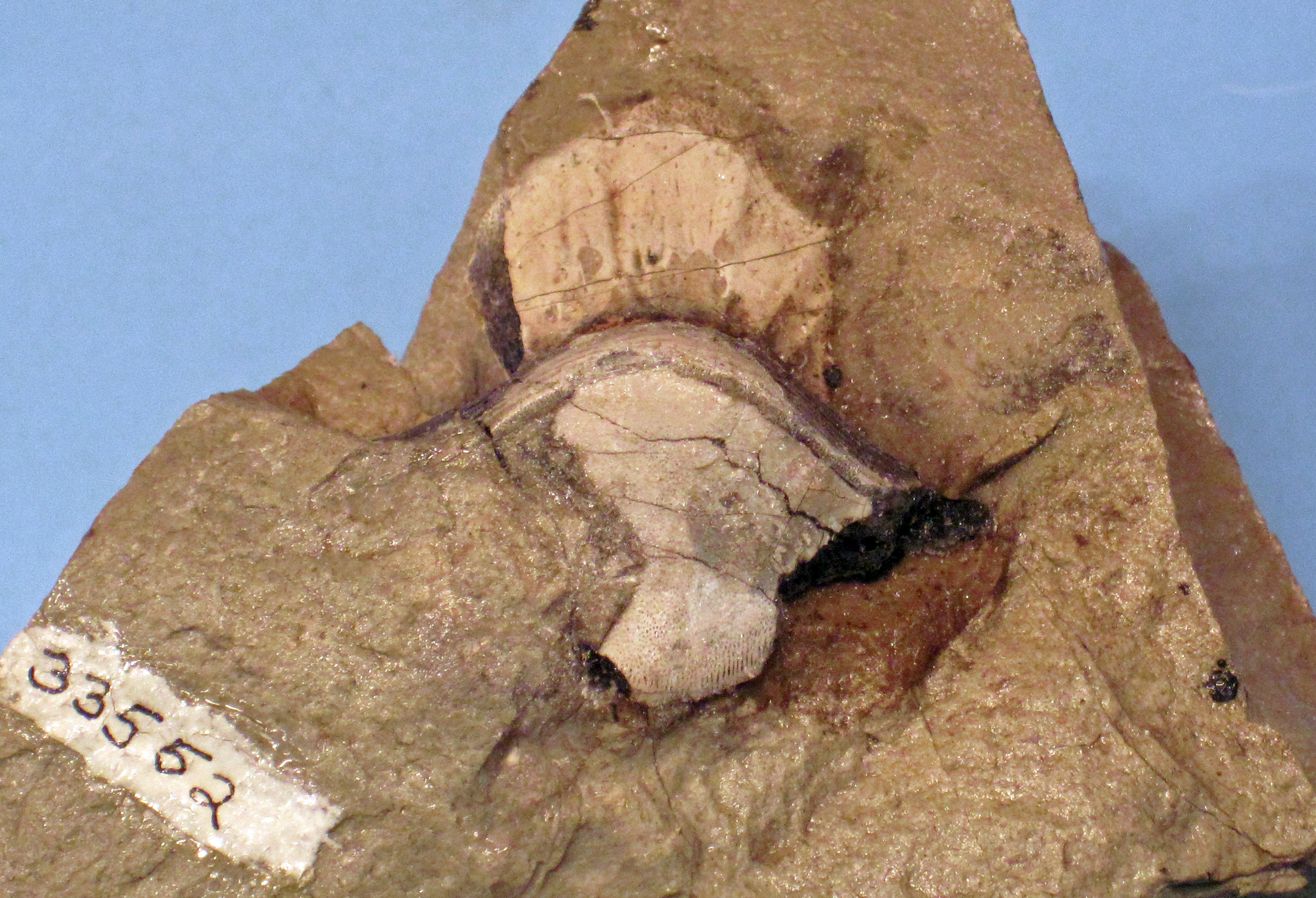
- Fossilized tooth of the Carboniferous-Permian shark Petalodus
  †Petalodus
- †Petigurus
  - †Petigurus cullisoni
- †Petraia – tentative report
- †Petraster
- †Petrocrania
  - †Petrocrania inflata
- †Phacellopegma
  - †Phacellopegma schizoderma
- †Phacelocrinus
  - †Phacelocrinus brevis – type locality for species
  - †Phacelocrinus rosei
- †Phanassymetria
  - †Phanassymetria quadrupla
  - †Phanassymetria triserrata
- †Phanelactis
- †Phaneroneura – type locality for genus
  - †Phaneroneura martynovae – type locality for species
  - †Phaneroneura reducta – type locality for species
- †Phanocrinus
  - †Phanocrinus alexanderi – type locality for species
- †Pharkidonotus
  - †Pharkidonotus percarinatus
- †Phenopterum
  - †Phenopterum elongatum
- †Phestia
  - †Phestia inflata
- †Philhedra
- †Phillipsia – tentative report
- †Phimocrinus
- †Pholidocidaris – tentative report
  - †Pholidocidaris irregularis – or unidentified comparable form
- †Phragmodus
  - †Phragmodus inflexus
  - †Phragmodus undatus
- †Phragmolites
- †Phricodothyris
- †Phyloblatta
  - †Phyloblatta curvata
- †Phymatopleura
  - †Phymatopleura heteropleura – type locality for species
  - †Phymatopleura nodosa
- †Pidelocrinus
  - †Pidelocrinus planus
- †Pilosisporites
  - †Pilosisporites aculeolatus
  - †Pilosisporites williamsii
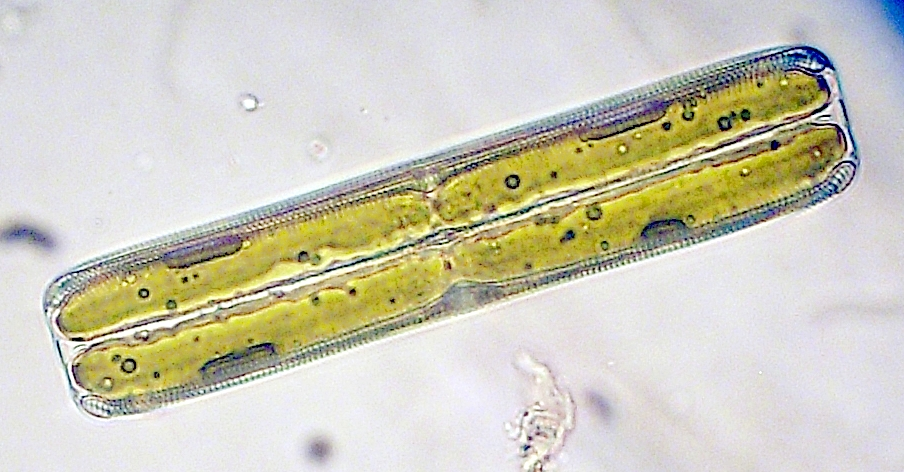
- Light micrograph of a Pinnularia alga
  †Pinnularia
- †Pirocystella
- †Pisocrinus
  - †Pisocrinus quinquelobus
  - †Pisocrinus spatulatus
  - †Pisocrinus spatulus
  - †Pisocrinus tennesseensis
- †Pityosporites
  - †Pityosporites westphalensis
- †Placotriplesia
  - †Placotriplesia praecipta
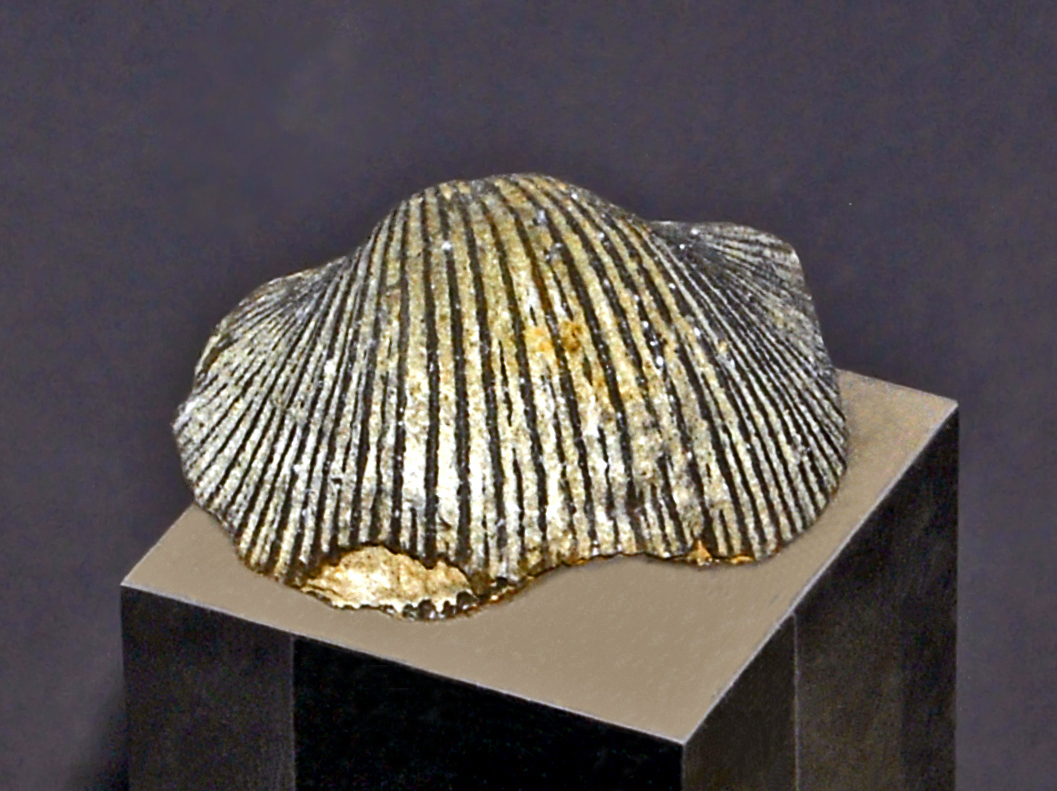
- Fossilized shell of the Ordovician brachiopod Plaesiomys
  †Plaesiomys
  - †Plaesiomys bellistriatus
  - †Plaesiomys proavitus
  - †Plaesiomys subquadrata
- †Plagioglypta
  - †Plagioglypta annulostriatum
- †Planisporites
- †Planobola
  - †Planobola macrogota
- †Platyceras
  - †Platyceras subelegans
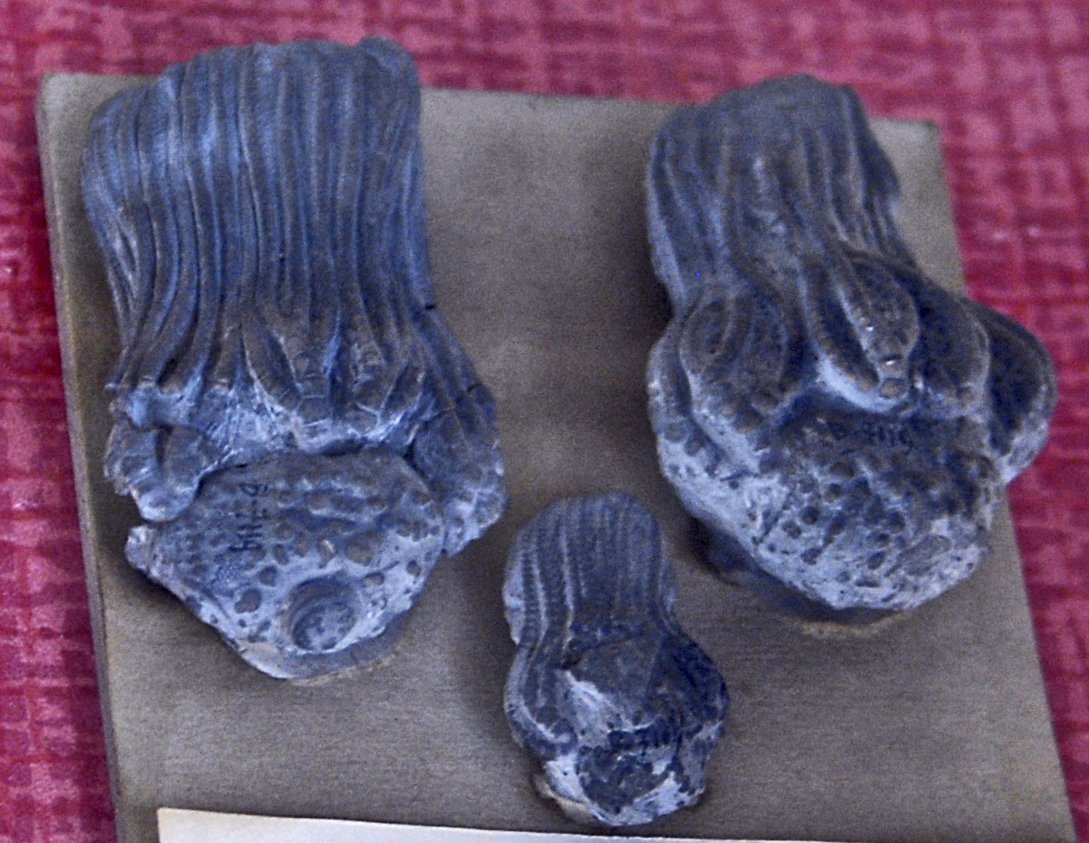
- Three fossilized calyces of the Devonian-Permian crinoid ("sea lily") Platycrinites
  †Platycrinites
- †Platycystites
  - †Platycystites bassleri
  - †Platycystites bromidensis
  - †Platycystites faberi
  - †Platycystites fimbriatus
  - †Platycystites infundus
  - †Platycystites levatus
- †Platyfundocrinus
  - †Platyfundocrinus webbersensis – type locality for species
- †Platymena – tentative report
  - †Platymena bellatula
- †Platyrhomboides
  - †Platyrhomboides quadratus
- †Platysaccus
  - †Platysaccus papilionis
  - †Platysaccus saarensis
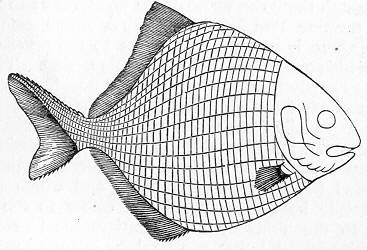
- Life restoration of the Carboniferous-Permian bony fish Platysomus
  †Platysomus
  - †Platysomus palmaris – or unidentified comparable form
- †Platystrophia
  - †Platystrophia prima
  - †Platystrophia sutherlandi
  - †Platystrophia uncinata
- †Plectambonites
  - †Plectambonites sericeus
- †Plectodonta
  - †Plectodonta petila
- †Plectoglossa
  - †Plectoglossa oklahomensis
- †Plectorthis
  - †Plectorthis punctata
  - †Plectorthis symmetrica
- †Pleuracanthus
  - †Pleuracanthus gracilis
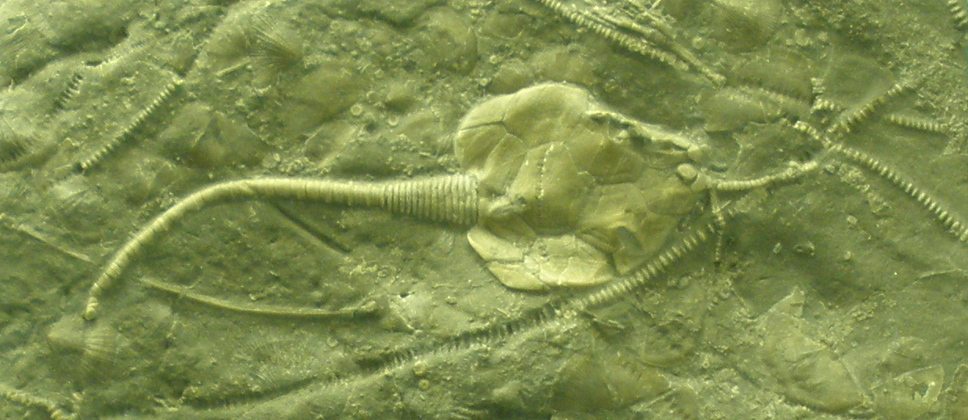
- Fossil of the Late Ordovician cystoid echinoderm Pleurocystites
  †Pleurocystites
  - †Pleurocystites watkinsi
- †Plicochonetes
- †Pliomerops
  - †Pliomerops canadensis – or unidentified comparable form
- †Pluchratia
- †Plummericrinus
  - †Plummericrinus expansus – type locality for species
- †Poikilofusa
  - †Poikilofusa plethysticha
- †Polidevcia
  - †Polidevcia bellistriata
  - †Polidevcia vaseyana – or unidentified comparable form
- †Poloniella
  - †Poloniella chaleurensis – or unidentified comparable form
- †Polyancistrodorus
  - †Polyancistrodorus columbariferus
- †Polycaulodus
  - †Polycaulodus bidentatus
  - †Polycaulodus tridentatus
- †Polycladiopora
  - †Polycladiopora pinnata – or unidentified comparable form
- †Polydeltoideus
  - †Polydeltoideus enodatus
- †Polygnathodella – type locality for genus
  - †Polygnathodella ouachitensis – type locality for species
- †Polygnathoides
  - †Polygnathoides siluricus
- †Polygnathus
  - †Polygnathus wapanuckensis – type locality for species
- †Polylophothylax
  - †Polylophothylax crossii
- †Polyplacognathus
  - †Polyplacognathus sweeti
- †Polypora
  - †Polypora debilis – type locality for species
  - †Polypora ovicellata – type locality for species
- †Polytylites
  - †Polytylites coryelli – type locality for species
  - †Polytylites kellettae – type locality for species
  - †Polytylites levinsoni – type locality for species
- †Porocrinus
  - †Porocrinus bromidensis
- †Postibulla
  - †Postibulla westergaardi – type locality for species
- †Poteriocrinus – tentative report
- †Potonieisporites
  - †Potonieisporites simplex – type locality for species
- †Praecursoricrinus
  - †Praecursoricrinus sulphurensis
- †Praepleurocystis
  - †Praepleurocystis watkinsi
- †Prasopora
  - †Prasopora fritzae
- †Primitiella
  - †Primitiella varicata
- †Primitiopsis
  - †Primitiopsis bassleri
  - †Primitiopsis elegans
  - †Primitiopsis excavatus
  - †Primitiopsis minutus
- †Prioniodus
  - †Prioniodus altodus – type locality for species
  - †Prioniodus gerdae
- †Prismopora
- †Proallosocrinus
  - †Proallosocrinus exemptus – type locality for species
  - †Proallosocrinus glenisteri – type locality for species
- †Probnis
  - †Probnis speciosa
- †Probolichas
- †Prodentalium
- †Productella
  - †Productella recensis – type locality for species
- †Productus
  - †Productus parvus
  - †Productus stehlii – type locality for species
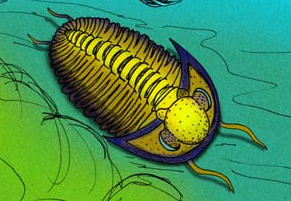
- Restoration of the Silurian trilobite Proetus
  †Proetus
  - †Proetus foculus
- †Progoneura
  - †Progoneura grimaldii – type locality for species
  - †Progoneura nobilis – type locality for species
  - †Progoneura venula – type locality for species
- †Prokopicrinus
  - †Prokopicrinus laevis
  - †Prokopicrinus tuberculatus
- †Promopalaeaster
- †Proshumardites
- †Protencrinus
  - †Protencrinus atoka – type locality for species
- †Protereisma
  - †Protereisma arcuatum – or unidentified comparable form
  - †Protereisma latum
- †Prothalassoceras
  - †Prothalassoceras inexpectans – type locality for species
- †Prothyris
  - †Prothyris soleniformis – type locality for species
- †Protocaptorhinus
  - †Protocaptorhinus pricei
- †Protohaploxypinus
  - †Protohaploxypinus duivenii
  - †Protohaploxypinus rugosus
  - †Protohaploxypinus samoilovichii
  - †Protohaploxypinus suchonensis – or unidentified comparable form
- †Protohymen
  - †Protohymen anomalus – type locality for species
  - †Protohymen bifurcatus – type locality for species
  - †Protohymen curvatus – type locality for species
  - †Protohymen largus – type locality for species
  - †Protohymen latus – type locality for species
  - †Protohymen pictus – type locality for species
  - †Protohymen readi
  - †Protohymen shafferi – type locality for species
  - †Protohymen venustus – type locality for species
- †Protozyga
  - †Protozyga loeblichi
- †Prouddenites
  - †Prouddenites primus
- †Pseodorthoceras
- †Pseudelmoa – type locality for genus
  - †Pseudelmoa ampla – type locality for species
- †Pseudoconocardium
- †Pseudocryptophyllum – or unidentified comparable form
- †Pseudodielasma
  - †Pseudodielasma perplexa
- †Pseudoiasvia – type locality for genus
  - †Pseudoiasvia sinuosa – type locality for species
- †Pseudolingula
  - †Pseudolingula elegantula – or unidentified comparable form
  - †Pseudolingula imperfecta
- †Pseudomera
  - †Pseudomera barrandei
- †Pseudomonotis – tentative report
- †Pseudomulceodens
  - †Pseudomulceodens cancellatus – or unidentified related form
- †Pseudoolenoides
  - †Pseudoolenoides acicaudus
  - †Pseudoolenoides carterensis – type locality for species
  - †Pseudoolenoides derbyi – type locality for species
- †Pseudooneotodus
  - †Pseudooneotodus bicornis
  - †Pseudooneotodus linguicornis
- †Pseudoparalegoceras
  - †Pseudoparalegoceras brazoense
- †Pseudopronorites
  - †Pseudopronorites arkansasense
  - †Pseudopronorites quinni
- †Pseudorthoceras
  - †Pseudorthoceras knoxense
- †Pseudosyrinx
  - †Pseudosyrinx missouriensis – or unidentified comparable form
- †Pseudothoceras
- †Pseudozygopleura
  - †Pseudozygopleura multicostata – tentative report
  - †Pseudozygopleura peoriense
  - †Pseudozygopleura plebium – tentative report
  - †Pseudozygopleura scitula
- †Psilokirkbyella
  - †Psilokirkbyella magnopuncata
- †Psophosphaera
  - †Psophosphaera greeri
- †Pteroconus – tentative report
  - †Pteroconus abbreviatus
- †Pteronites
  - †Pteronites angustatus – or unidentified comparable form
- †Pterotocrinus – tentative report
  - †Pterotocrinus springerensis – type locality for species
- †Ptychocladia
  - †Ptychocladia bassleri
- †Ptychopleurella
  - †Ptychopleurella rugiplicata
- †Pudoproetus
  - †Pudoproetus chappelensis
- †Pulchratia
- †Pulchrilamina
  - †Pulchrilamina spinosa
- †Punctaparchites
  - †Punctaparchites rugosus
- †Punctatisporites
  - †Punctatisporites flavus
  - †Punctatisporites glaber
  - †Punctatisporites minutus
- †Punctatosporites
  - †Punctatosporites minutus
- †Punctospirifer
  - †Punctospirifer kentuckensis
  - †Punctospirifer subtexta
  - †Punctospirifer transversa
- †Punctothyris
  - †Punctothyris kenwoodensis
- †Punka
  - †Punka akoura
  - †Punka verecunda
- †Pustula
  - †Pustula kenwoodensis – type locality for species
  - †Pustula oklahomae – type locality for species
- †Pycnopora
  - †Pycnopora ovatipora – type locality for species
- †Pygmaeocrinus
- †Pyrgocystis

== Q ==
- †Quadrocystis
  - †Quadrocystis graffhami

== R ==
- †Raaschia – type locality for genus
  - †Raaschia oklahomensis – type locality for species
- †Rafinesquina
- †Raistrickia
  - †Raistrickia abdita
  - †Raistrickia aculeata
  - †Raistrickia aculeolata
  - †Raistrickia breveinens
  - †Raistrickia crinita
  - †Raistrickia crocea
- †Rakverella – tentative report
- †Ranapeltis
  - †Ranapeltis rowlandi – type locality for species
- †Ranasasus
  - †Ranasasus brevicephalus
  - †Ranasasus colossus
  - †Ranasasus conicus
- †Randaynia
  - †Randaynia leatherburyi
- †Raphistoma
- †Rayella
  - †Rayella calvini
  - †Rayella parva
- †Raymondites
- †Rayonnoceras
  - †Rayonnoceras vaughanianum – type locality for species
- †Rectifenestella
  - †Rectifenestella tenax
- †Redstonia
  - †Redstonia cooperi
- †Reedops
  - †Reedops deckeri
- †Regulaecystis
- †Remopleurides
- †Renalcis
- †Renaultia
- †Rensselaerina
  - †Rensselaerina haraganana
- Reophax
  - †Reophax oacuhitensis – type locality for species
- †Resserella
  - †Resserella brownsportensis
- †Reteocrinus
  - †Reteocrinus depressus – type locality for species
- †Reticestus – tentative report
  - †Reticestus retiferus
- †Reticulaiina
- †Reticulariina
- †Reticulatisporites
  - †Reticulatisporites reticulatus
- †Reticulopteris
  - †Reticulopteris muensteri
- †Retispira
  - †Retispira meekiana
  - †Retispira reticulata – type locality for species
- †Rhabdomeson
  - †Rhabdomeson foerstei – type locality for species
  - †Rhabdomeson rogersi – type locality for species
  - †Rhabdomeson ulrichi – type locality for species
- †Rhipidomella
  - †Rhipidomella acutisulcata – type locality for species
  - †Rhipidomella diminutiva
  - †Rhipidomella henryhousensis – type locality for species
  - †Rhipidomella oklahomensis – type locality for species
  - †Rhipidomella subtriangularis – type locality for species
- †Rhipidomelloides
  - †Rhipidomelloides oblata
- †Rhiptosocherma
  - †Rhiptosocherma improcera
- †Rhizomaspora – type locality for genus
  - †Rhizomaspora divaricata – type locality for species
  - †Rhizomaspora lemniscata – type locality for species
  - †Rhizomaspora radiata – type locality for species
- †Rhizomospora
- †Rhizophyllum
- †Rhombocladia
- †Rhombopora
  - †Rhombopora johnsvalleyensis – type locality for species
  - †Rhombopora nitidula – type locality for species
- †Rhopalia
  - †Rhopalia catenata
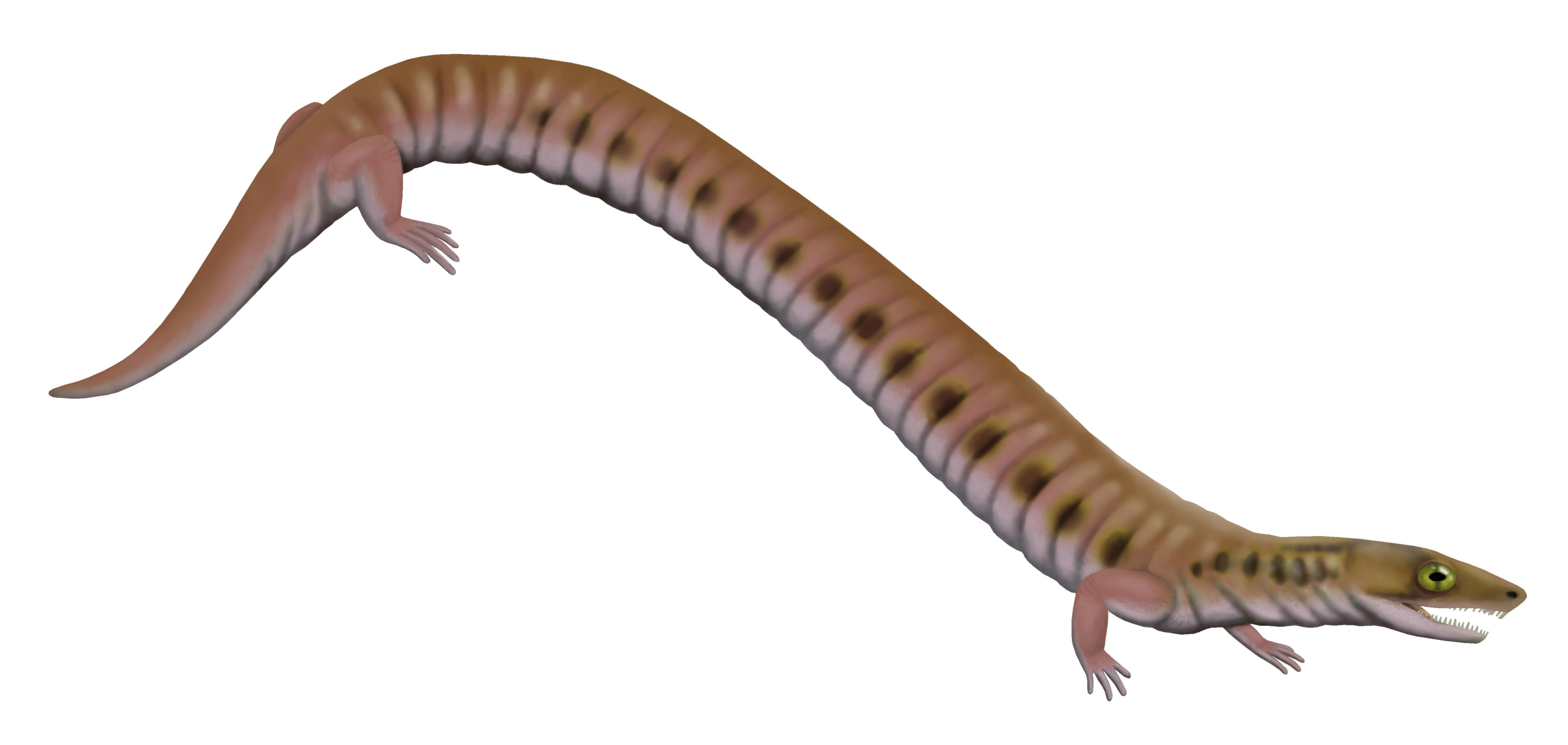
- Life restoration of the Permian amphibian Rhynchonkos
  †Rhynchonkos
  - †Rhynchonkos stovalli – type locality for species
- †Rhynchopora
  - †Rhynchopora kollari – type locality for species
  - †Rhynchopora persinuata
- †Rhynchospirina
  - †Rhynchospirina maxwelli – type locality for species
- †Rhynchotrema
  - †Rhynchotrema increbescens – tentative report
- †Richardsonites
  - †Richardsonites richardsonianus – type locality for species
- †Rishona
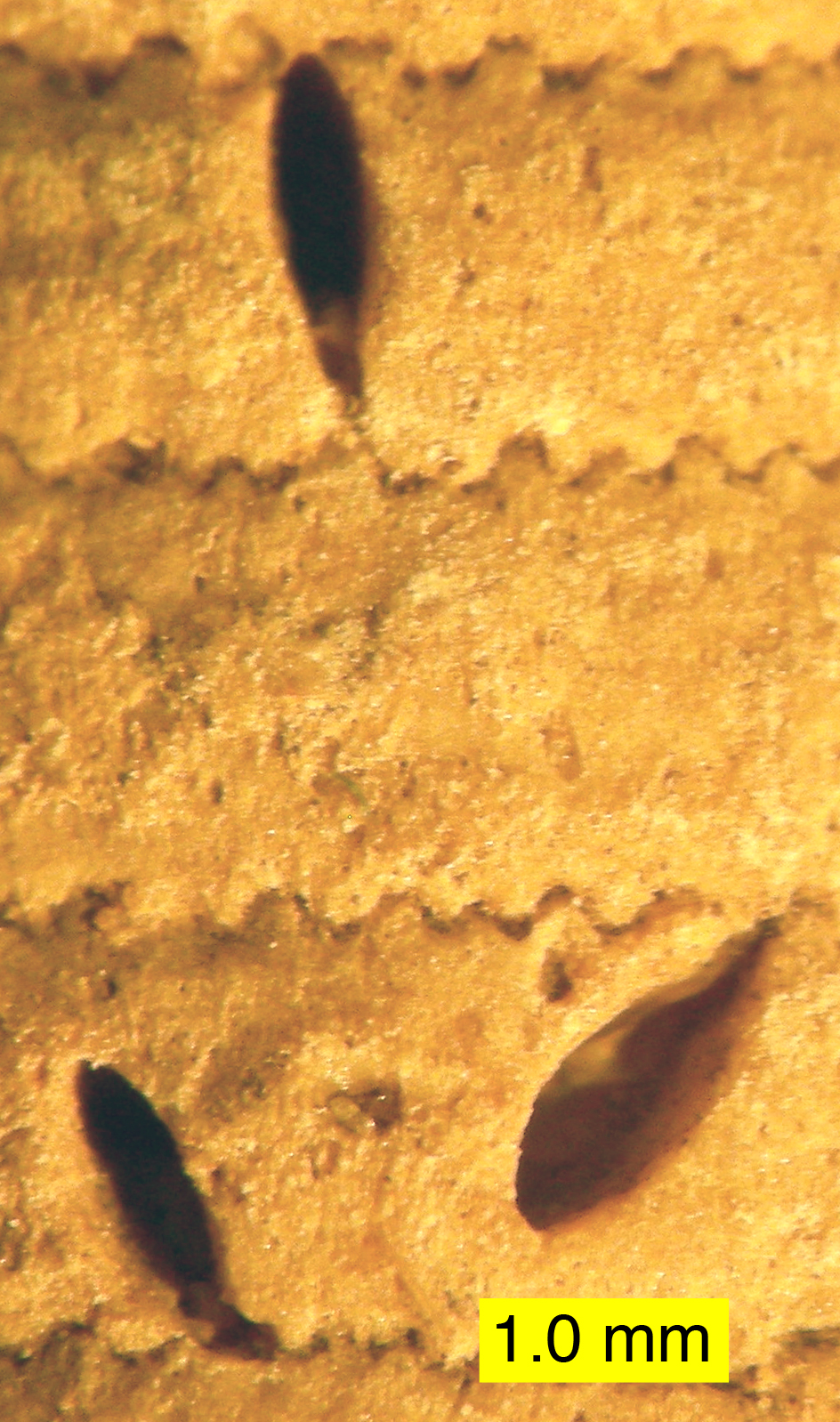
- Fossil of the barnacle boring ichnogenus Rogerella
  Rogerella
- †Rollia
  - †Rollia goodwini
- Rostricellula
  - †Rostricellula cuneata
- †Rothella
  - †Rothella haraganensis – type locality for species
  - †Rothella obliqua
  - †Rothella recta
- †Rothianiscus
  - †Rothianiscus robusta – type locality for species
- †Roundyella
  - †Roundyella bellatula
- †Rowleyella
  - †Rowleyella fabulites
- †Rugosochinetes
- †Rugosochonetes
  - †Rugosochonetes multicostus

== S ==
- †Saccocrinus
  - †Saccocrinus benedicti
- †Saffordotaxis
- †Sagenodus
  - †Sagenodus vinslovi
- †Sandia
- †Sanguinolites
  - †Sanguinolites omalianus
  - †Sanguinolites raleighensis
  - †Sanguinolites simulans
- †Sansabella
  - †Sansabella keslingi – type locality for species
  - †Sansabella truncata – or unidentified comparable form
- †Sansabelloides
- †Sargentina
  - †Sargentina allani – or unidentified comparable form
- †Saucrophyllum
- †Scaphiocrinus – tentative report
- †Schellwienella
  - †Schellwienella marcidula
- †Schistoceras
  - †Schistoceras unicum – type locality for species
- †Schizambon
  - †Schizambon perspinosum
- †Schizodus
  - †Schizodus chesterensis
  - †Schizodus ovatus
  - †Schizodus texanus
- †Schizonema
  - †Schizonema hami
- †Schizophoria
  - †Schizophoria mayesensis – type locality for species
- †Schmidtella
  - †Schmidtella affinis
  - †Schmidtella asymmetrica
  - †Schmidtella brevis
  - †Schmidtella crassimarginata
  - †Schmidtella excavata
  - †Schmidtella minuta
  - †Schmidtella ovalis
  - †Schmidtella transversa
- †Schopfipollenites
  - †Schopfipollenites signatus – type locality for species
- †Schuchertella
  - †Schuchertella attentuata
  - †Schuchertella haraganensis
- †Sciadiocrinus
  - †Sciadiocrinus cascus – type locality for species
  - †Sciadiocrinus crassacanthus
  - †Sciadiocrinus planulatus
- †Scolecia
  - †Scolecia filosa
- †Scolecopteris
  - †Scolecopteris altissima
  - †Scolecopteris gnoma
- †scolerodont
- †Scolopodus
  - †Scolopodus oklahomensis – type locality for species
  - †Scolopodus striatum – type locality for species
- †Scutepustula
  - †Scutepustula arctifossa
- †Scyphocrinites
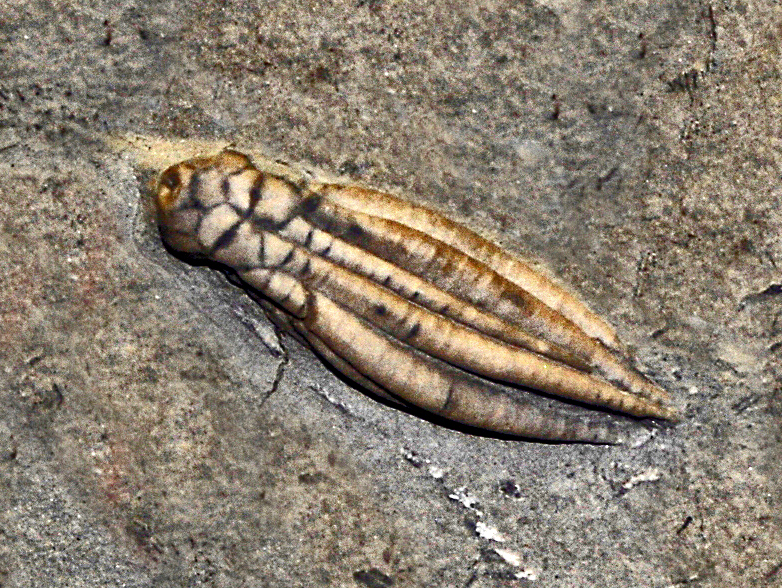
- Fossilized calyx of the Carboniferous crinoid ("sea lily") Scytalocrinus
  †Scytalocrinus
  - †Scytalocrinus crassibrachiatus – type locality for species
  - †Scytalocrinus sansabensis
- †Sedgwickia
  - †Sedgwickia rugosa – type locality for species
- †Seminolites
  - †Seminolites kosomensis – type locality for species
  - †Seminolites perforatus – type locality for species
  - †Seminolites pushmatahensis – type locality for species
- †Seminolithes
  - †Seminolithes clarkei – type locality for species
- †Senftenbergia
- †Septimyalina
  - †Septimyalina burmai
- †Septopora
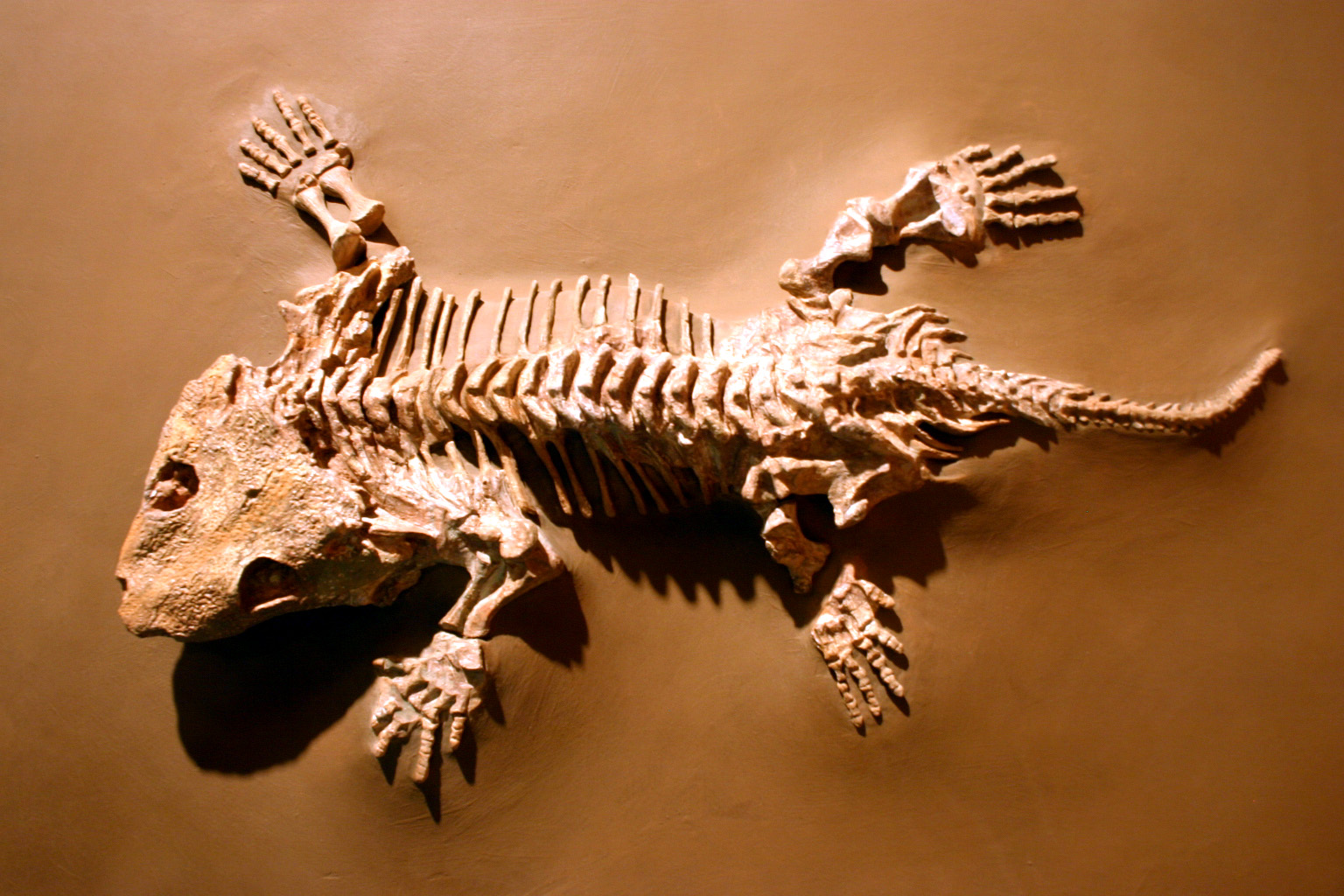
- Fossilized skeleton of the Permian primitive four-limbed animal Seymouria
  †Seymouria
  - †Seymouria baylorensis
- †Shaleria – tentative report
- †Shansiella
  - †Shansiella carbonaria – tentative report
- †Shumardoceras
- †Sibyrhynchus
- †Sieberella
  - †Sieberella roemeri
- †Sievertsia
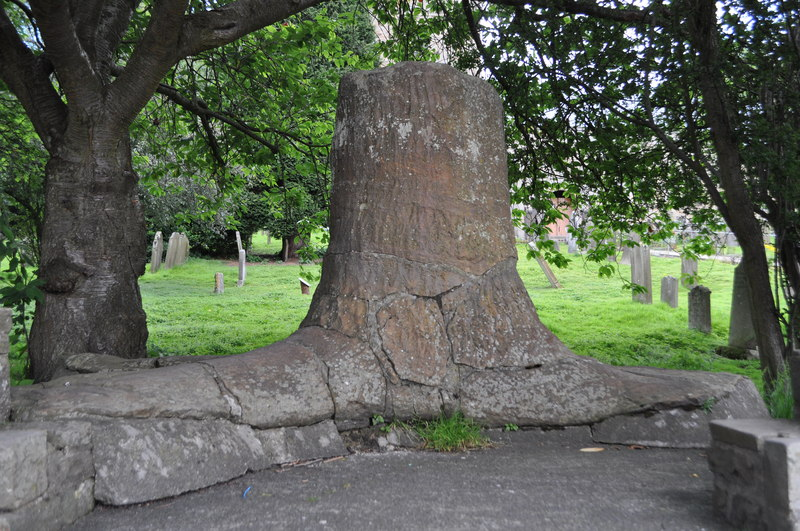
- Fossilized stump of the Carboniferous-Permian club moss relative Sigillaria
  †Sigillaria
- †Sigmophlebia – type locality for genus
  - †Sigmophlebia engeli – type locality for species
- †Sillerpeton – type locality for genus
  - †Sillerpeton permianum – type locality for species
- †Sinclairocystis
  - †Sinclairocystis angulatus
  - †Sinclairocystis praedicta
  - †Sinclairocystis sulphurensis
- †Sinuitina
  - †Sinuitina cordiformis – type locality for species
- †Sinuopea
  - †Sinuopea basiplanata
  - †Sinuopea vera
- †Siphonocrinus
  - †Siphonocrinus dignus
- †Skenidioides
  - †Skenidioides henryhousensis
  - †Skenidioides oklahomensis
  - †Skenidioides perfectus
- †Skenidium
  - †Skenidium insigne
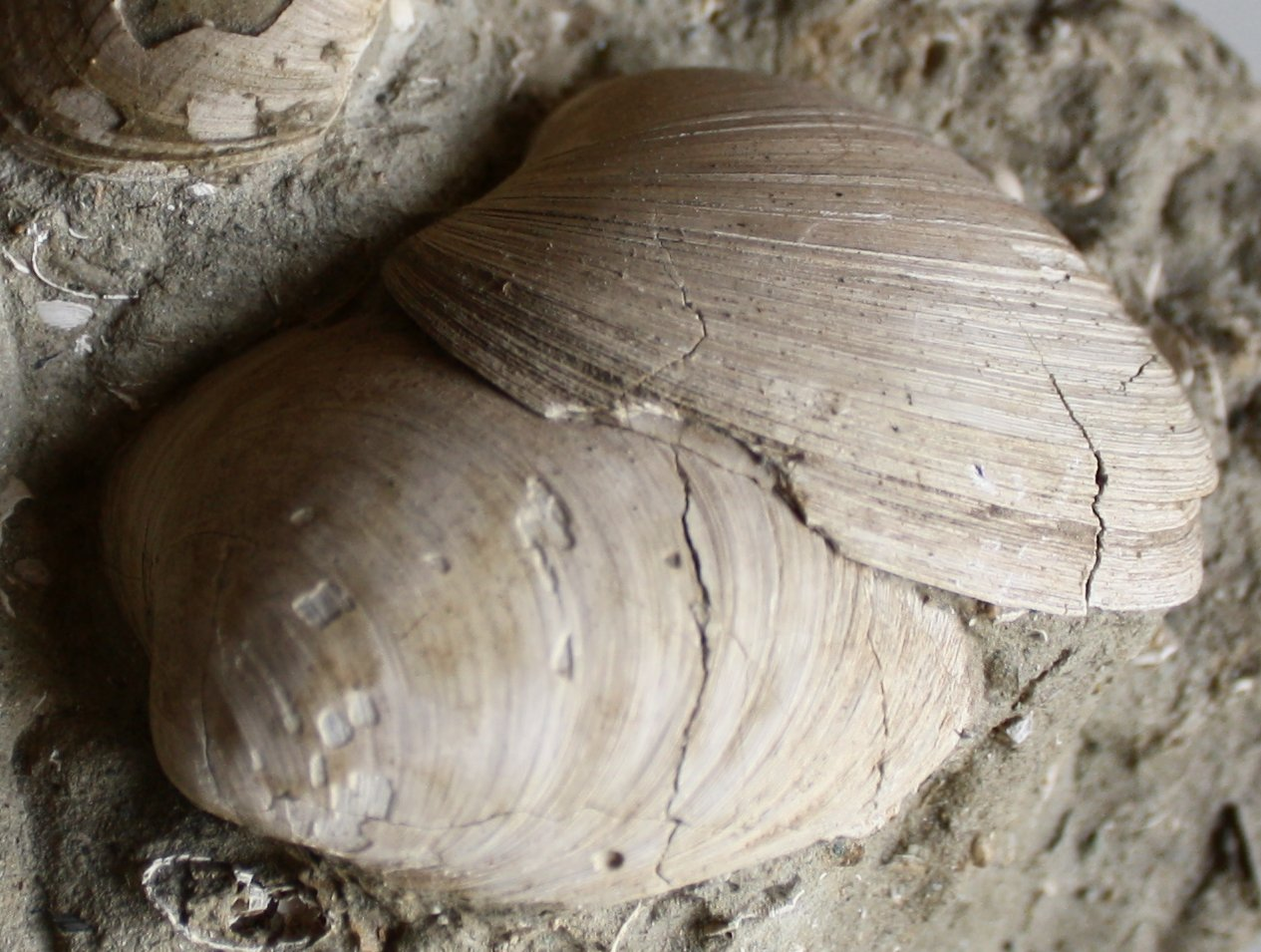
- Fossilized shells of the marine bivalve Solecurtus
  Solecurtus
  - †Solecurtus gardneri – type locality for species
- Solemya – report made of unidentified related form or using admittedly obsolete nomenclature
- †Soleniscus
  - †Soleniscus primigenia
  - †Soleniscus regularis
- †Solenochilus
- †Solenomorpha – tentative report
  - †Solenomorpha nitida – or unidentified comparable form
- †Somoholites
- †Sowerbyella
  - †Sowerbyella indistincta
  - †Sowerbyella plicatifera
  - †Sowerbyella variabilis
  - †Sowerbyella vulgata
- †Sowerbyites
  - †Sowerbyites hami
  - †Sowerbyites lamellosus
- †Spaniocrinus
- †Speyeris
  - †Speyeris hami
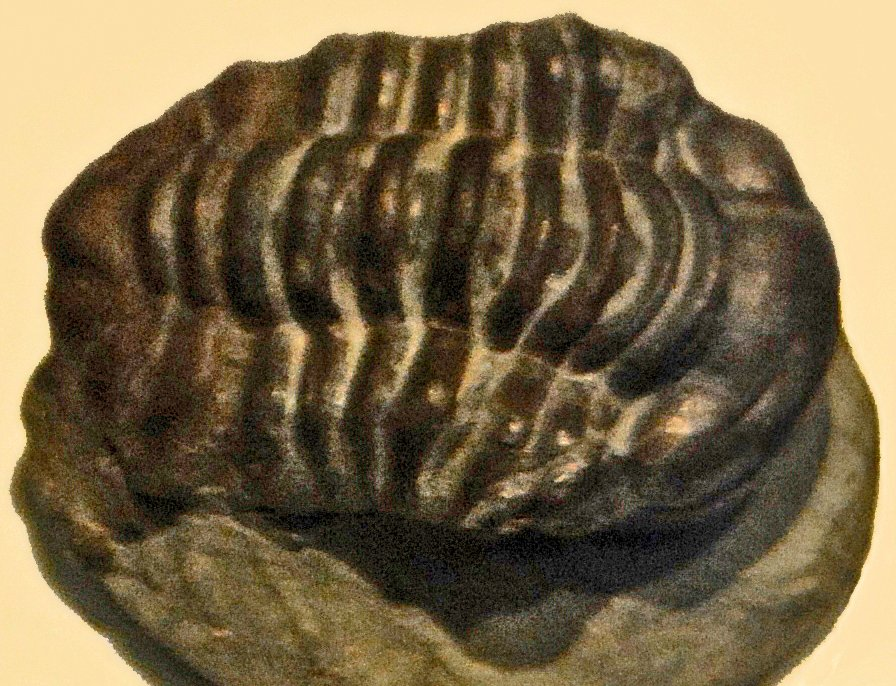
- Fossil of the Middle Ordovician-Silurian trilobite Sphaerexochus
  †Sphaerexochus
  - †Sphaerexochus glaber
- †Sphaerirhynchia
  - †Sphaerirhynchia glomerosa – type locality for species
  - †Sphaerirhynchia lindenensis
- †Sphaerocoryphe
- †Sphaerodoma
  - †Sphaerodoma gracilis
- †Sphaerolepis
  - †Sphaerolepis arctata
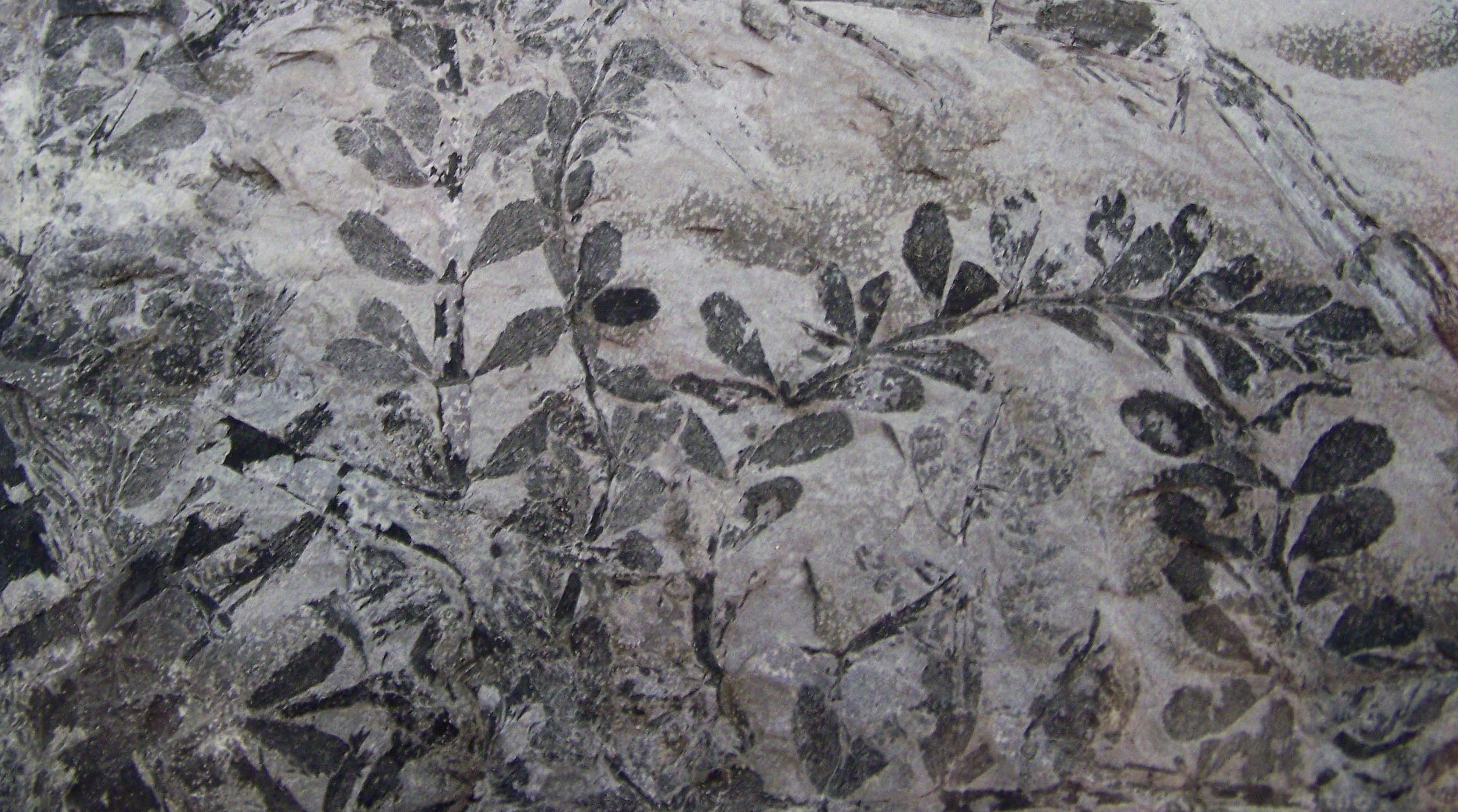
- Fossilized leaves and branches of the Devonian-Triassic horsetail relative Sphenophyllum
  †Sphenophyllum
  - †Sphenophyllum emarginatum
  - †Sphenophyllum gilmorei
  - †Sphenophyllum latifolium – or unidentified comparable form
  - †Sphenophyllum obovatum
  - †Sphenophyllum stoukenbergi – tentative report
- †Sphenopteris
  - †Sphenopteris macilenta
- †Spinobairdia
- †Spinocarinifera
  - †Spinocarinifera semicostata
- †Spinosporites
  - †Spinosporites exiguus
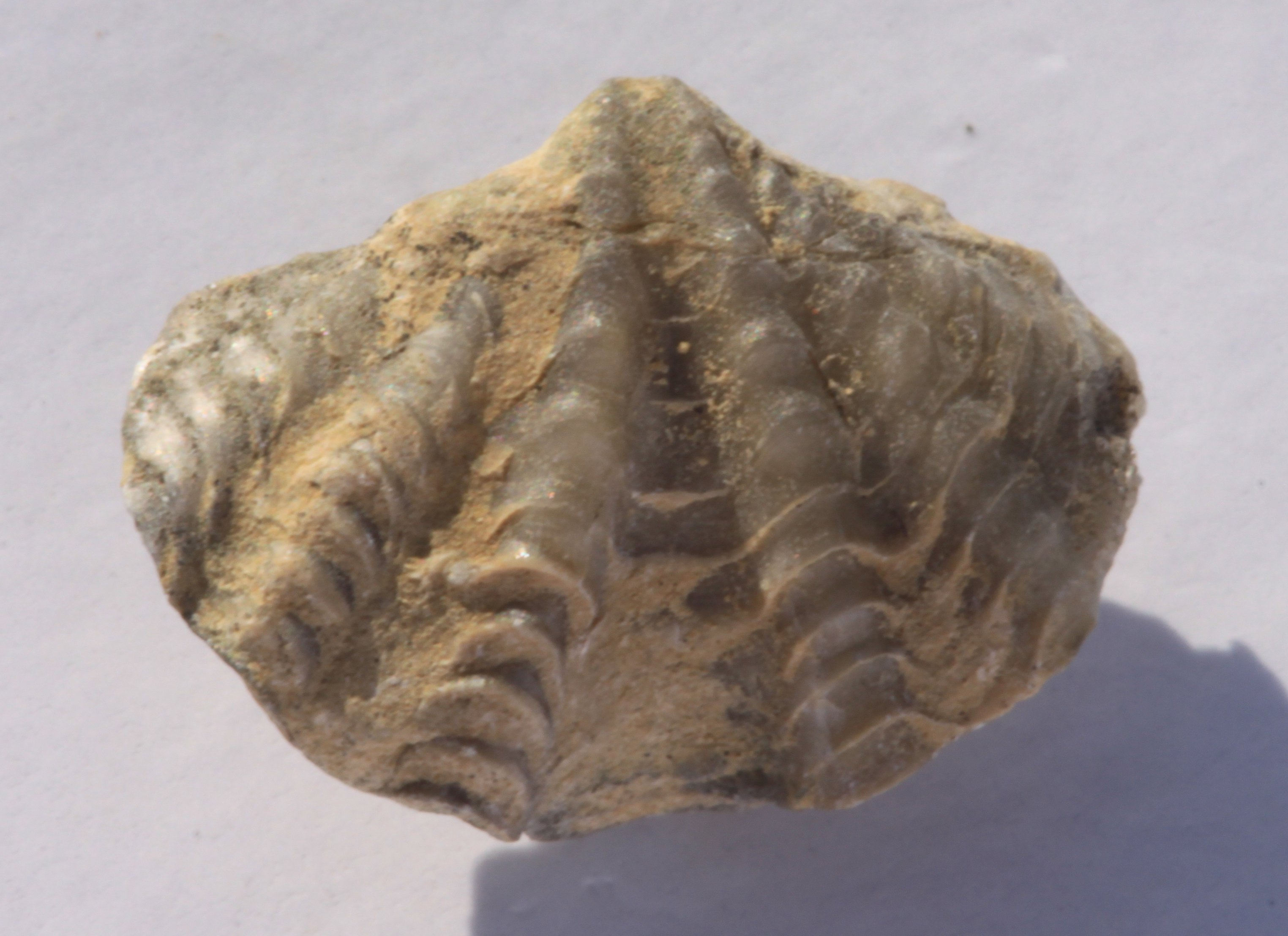
- Fossilized shell of the Late Ordovician-Late Triassic brachiopod Spirifer
  †Spirifer
  - †Spirifer casteri – type locality for species
  - †Spirifer grimesi
  - †Spirifer opimus
- †Spiriferellina
- †Spirillina
  - †Spirillina bendensis – type locality for species
- Spirorbis
  - †Spirorbis elegans – type locality for species
- †Spongophylloides
- †Squamularia
- †Stacheia
  - †Stacheia congesta
- †Staffella
- †Stegerhynchus
  - †Stegerhynchus carmelensis
  - †Stegerhynchus clairensis
  - †Stegerhynchus concinna
- †Stegnopsis
  - †Stegnopsis erythragora – type locality for species
  - †Stegnopsis wellingensis – type locality for species
- †Stegocoelia
- †Stellarocrinus
  - †Stellarocrinus cuneatus
- †Stenocladia – tentative report
  - †Stenocladia bassleri
- †Stenopecrinus
  - †Stenopecrinus ornatus – type locality for species
- †Stenopora
- †Stephanozyga
- †Steptognathodus
- †Stereobrachicrinus – type locality for genus
  - †Stereobrachicrinus pustullosus – type locality for species
- †Stereostylus
  - †Stereostylus perversus
- †Stictopora
  - †Stictopora fenestrata
- †Strabocystis – type locality for genus
  - †Strabocystis fayi – type locality for species
- †Straparollus
- †Straparolous
  - †Straparolous catilloides
  - †Straparolous catiloides
- †Streblochondria – tentative report
  - †Streblochondria tenuilineata
- †Strebloplax – type locality for genus
  - †Strebloplax crustacea – type locality for species
- †Streblotrypa
  - †Streblotrypa nicklesi
- †Streptognathodus
- †Streptorhynchus
- †Striatites
  - †Striatites richteri
- †Striatopodocarpites
  - †Striatopodocarpites caricicostatus
  - †Striatopodocarpites communis
  - †Striatopodocarpites olsonii
- †Strigigenalis
  - †Strigigenalis caudata
  - †Strigigenalis crassimarginata
  - †Strigigenalis derbyi
  - †Strigigenalis implexa
  - †Strigigenalis insentis
  - †Strigigenalis knighti – or unidentified comparable form
- †Strimplecystis – type locality for genus
  - †Strimplecystis oklahomensis – type locality for species
- †Strixella
  - †Strixella acutisulcata
- †Strobeus
  - †Strobeus brevis
  - †Strobeus gouldiana – type locality for species
  - †Strobeus intercalaris
  - †Strobeus paludinaeformis
- †Stroboceras
  - †Stroboceras furnishi – type locality for species
- †Stromatotrypa
  - †Stromatotrypa frondosa
- †Strongylocrinus
  - †Strongylocrinus hansoni – type locality for species
  - †Strongylocrinus ornatus – type locality for species
- †Strophochonetes
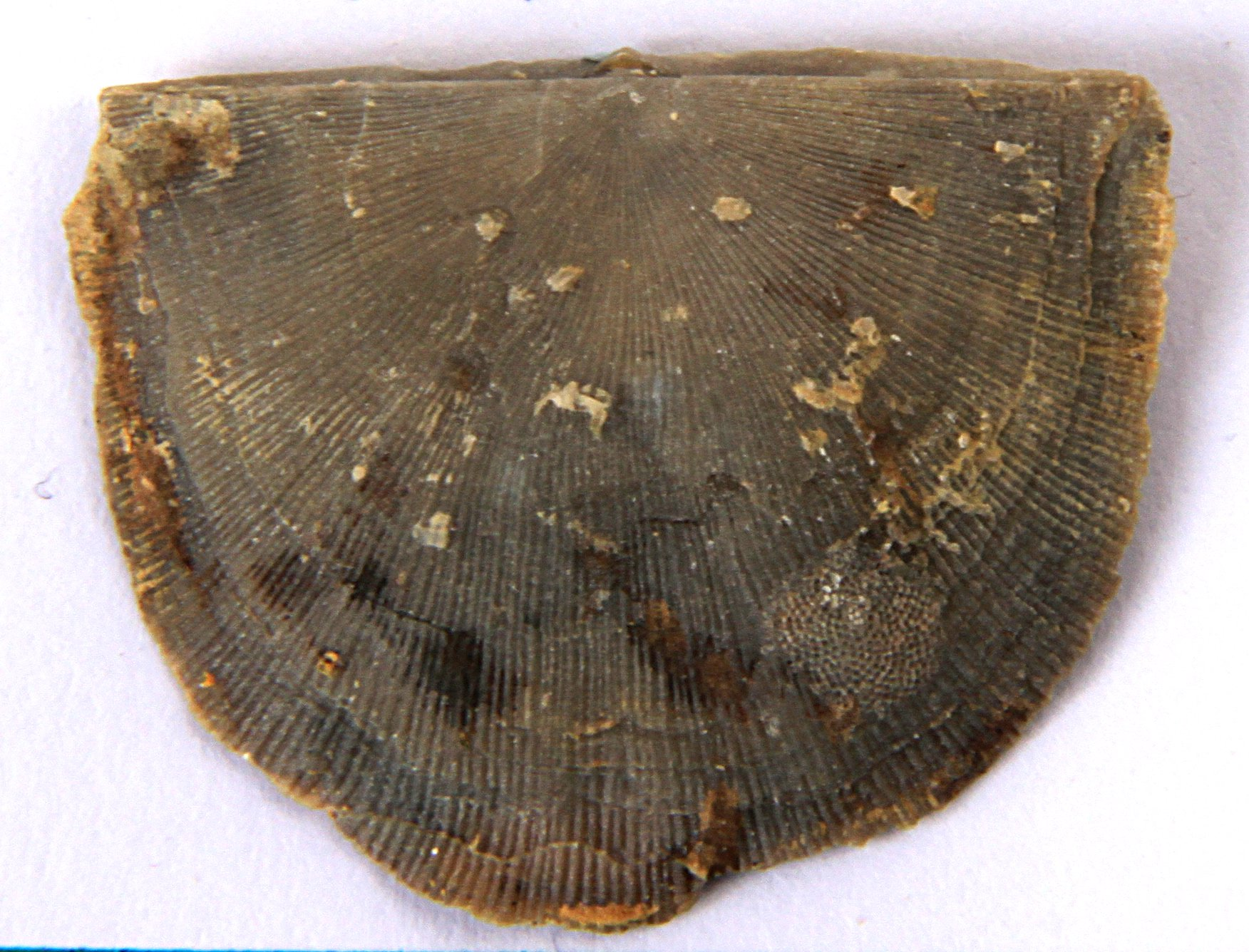
- Fossilized shell of the Ordovician-Silurian brachiopod Strophomena
  †Strophomena
  - †Strophomena clermontensis
  - †Strophomena costellata
  - †Strophomena crinerensis
  - †Strophomena neglecta
  - †Strophomena oklahomensis
  - †Strophomena perconcava – or unidentified comparable form
  - †Strophomena planumbona
  - †Strophomena trentonensis
- †Strophonella
  - †Strophonella alterniradiata
  - †Strophonella bransoni – type locality for species
  - †Strophonella laxiplicata
  - †Strophonella loeblichi
  - †Strophonella prolongata
- †Strophostylus
- †Strotersporites – type locality for genus
  - †Strotersporites communis – type locality for species
- †Stylocrinus
- †Sulcatisporites
  - †Sulcatisporites potoniei
- †Sylvohymen
  - †Sylvohymen ingens – type locality for species
- †Synchirocrinus
  - †Synchirocrinus divisus
  - †Synchirocrinus quadratus
- †Synerocrinus
  - †Synerocrinus farishi
- †Syngastrioceras
  - †Syngastrioceras clinei – type locality for species
  - †Syngastrioceras scotti
- †Syringaxon

== T ==
- †Tabulipora
  - †Tabulipora macnairi – type locality for species
  - †Tabulipora simplex – type locality for species
  - †Tabulipora tuberculata – or unidentified comparable form
- †Taeniaesporites
  - †Taeniaesporites noviaulensis – or unidentified comparable form
- †Taeniopteris
  - †Taeniopteris abnormis
  - †Taeniopteris multinervis
- †Tainoceras
  - †Tainoceras murrayi
- †Tanaocystis
  - †Tanaocystis watkinsi
- †Tarphyceras
  - †Tarphyceras chadwickense
- †Teguliferina
  - †Teguliferina parva – type locality for species
- †Tegulocrea
  - †Tegulocrea incerta
- †Teiichispira
  - †Teiichispira affinis – or unidentified comparable form
- †Tellinomorpha
  - †Tellinomorpha schencki – type locality for species
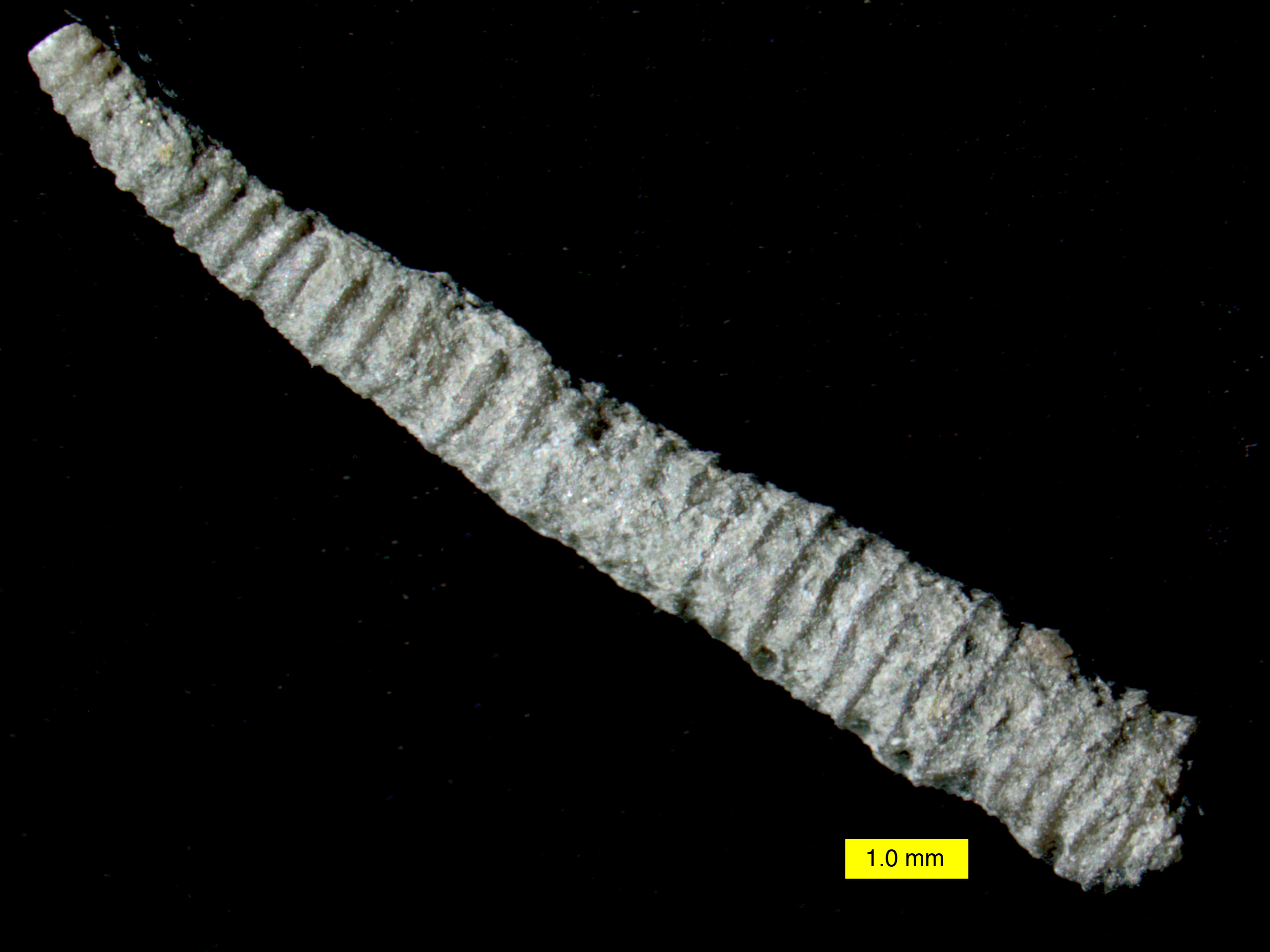
- Fossilized shell of the Early Ordovician-Late Devonian probable mollusc Tentaculites
  †Tentaculites
- †Terpnocrinus
- †Tersomius
  - †Tersomius dolesensis – type locality for species
  - †Tersomius mosesi – type locality for species
  - †Tersomius texensis – or unidentified comparable form
- †Tetradellina
  - †Tetradellina henningsmoeni
- †Tetrataxis
  - †Tetrataxis decurrens – or unidentified comparable form
  - †Tetrataxis lata
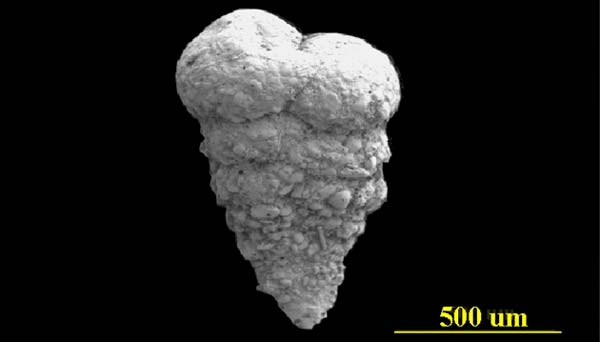
- Fossilized shell of the Carboniferous-modern foraminiferan Textularia
  Textularia
  - †Textularia grahamensis – or unidentified comparable form
- †Thalamocrinus
  - †Thalamocrinus elongatus
- †Thalattocanthus
  - †Thalattocanthus consonus
- †Thaleops
  - †Thaleops jaanussoni
- †Thallograptus
- †Thamniscus
  - †Thamniscus erectus – type locality for species
- †Thigriffides
  - †Thigriffides roundyi
- †Thlipsura
  - †Thlipsura furca
- †Thlipsurella
  - †Thlipsurella fossata
  - †Thlipsurella muricurva
  - †Thlipsurella murrayensis – type locality for species
  - †Thlipsurella putea
- †Thlipsuroides
- †Thomasatia
  - †Thomasatia auricula
- †Thomasatina
  - †Thomasatina bromidensis
  - †Thomasatina simplex
- †Thoracoceras
- †Thrausmosaurus – type locality for genus
  - †Thrausmosaurus serratidens – type locality for species
- †Thuroholia
  - †Thuroholia crinerensis
  - †Thuroholia croneisi
  - †Thuroholia overbrookensis
- †Thymnospora
  - †Thymnospora pseudothiessenii – or unidentified comparable form
- †Thymospora
  - †Thymospora pseudothiessenii
- †Tolypammina
- †Torispora
  - †Torispora securis
- †Torynifer
- †Trematospira
  - †Trematospira costata – or unidentified comparable form
  - †Trematospira hippolyte – or unidentified comparable form
- †Trepospira
  - †Trepospira depressa
- †Trigonirhynchia
  - †Trigonirhynchia acutirostella
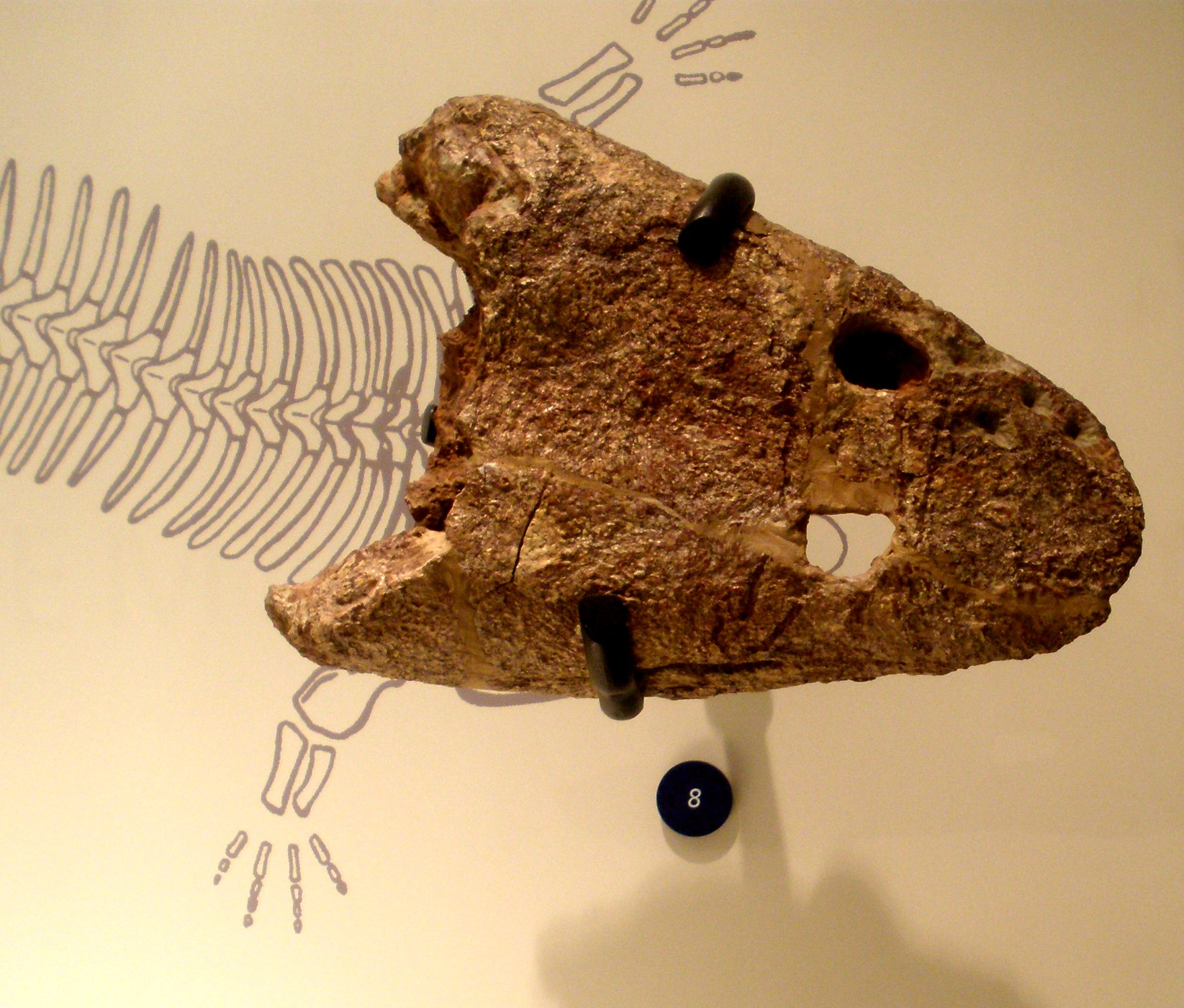
- Fossilized skull of the Permian amphibian Trimerorhachis
  †Trimerorhachis
  - †Trimerorhachis insignis
- †Triquitrites
  - †Triquitrites additus
  - †Triquitrites bransonii
  - †Triquitrites exiguus
  - †Triquitrites sculptilis
  - †Triquitrites spinosus
  - †Triquitrites subspinosus
  - †Triquitrites tribullatus
- †Tririctus – type locality for genus
  - †Tririctus reticulatus – type locality for species
- †Tritonoceras
- †Trochonodella
  - †Trochonodella obtusa
- †Trochosporites – type locality for genus
  - †Trochosporites reniformis – type locality for species
- †Trucherognathus
  - †Trucherognathus distorta
  - †Trucherognathus irregularis
- †Tryplasma
- †Tuberculatosporites
  - †Tuberculatosporites robustus
- †Tubulibairdia
  - †Tubulibairdia simplex
- †Tupus
  - †Tupus gracilis – type locality for species
- †Turgidacystis – type locality for genus
  - †Turgidacystis graffhami – type locality for species
- †Turrilepas
  - †Turrilepas whithersi – type locality for species

== U ==
- †Ulocrinus
- †Ulrichia
- †Ulrichidiscus
  - †Ulrichidiscus forbesi – type locality for species
- †Unibothriocidaris
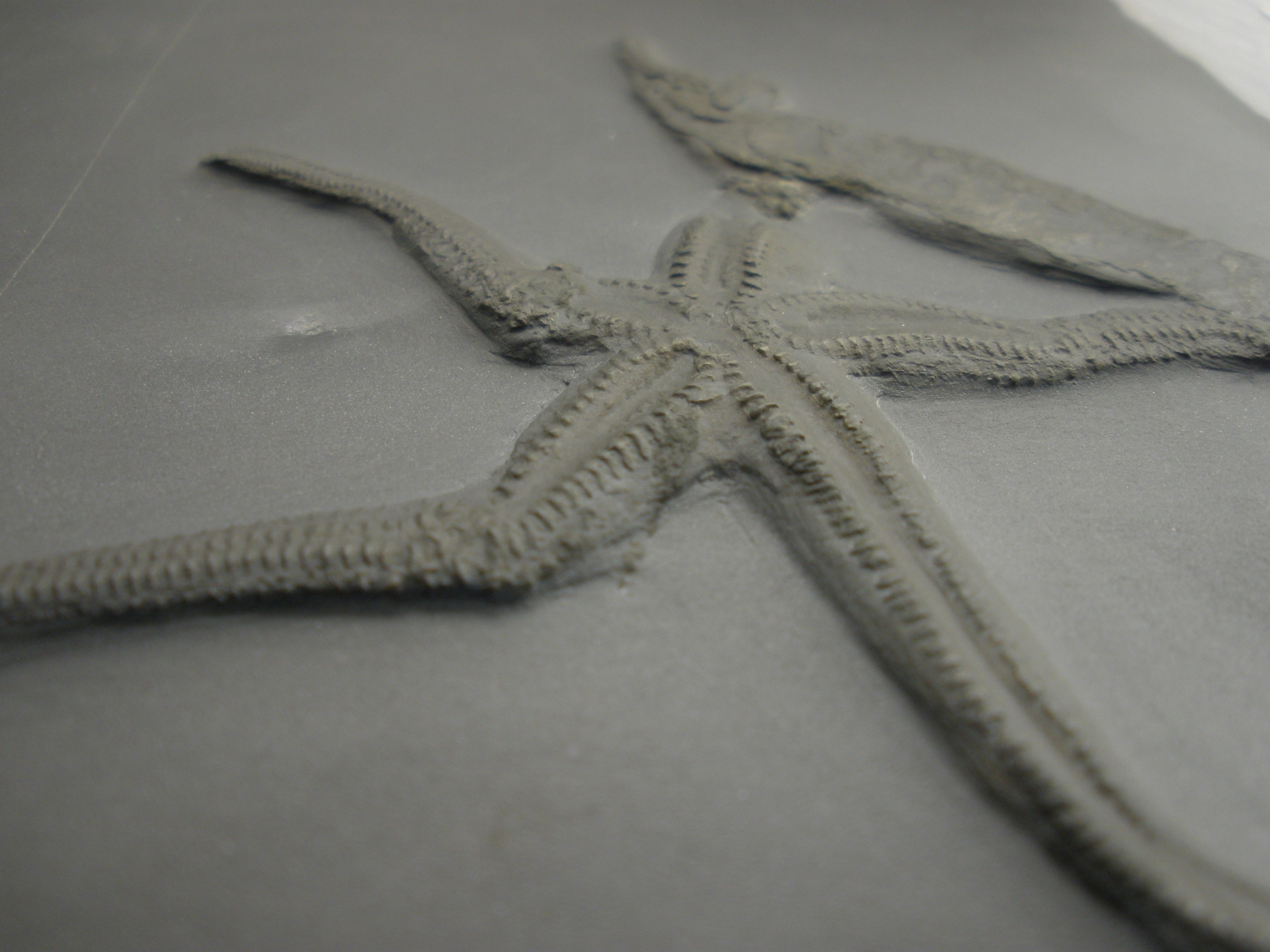
- Fossil of the Ordovician-Devonian sea star Urasterella
  †Urasterella
- †Utharocrinus
  - †Utharocrinus pentanodus

== V ==
- †Valcourea
  - †Valcourea transversa
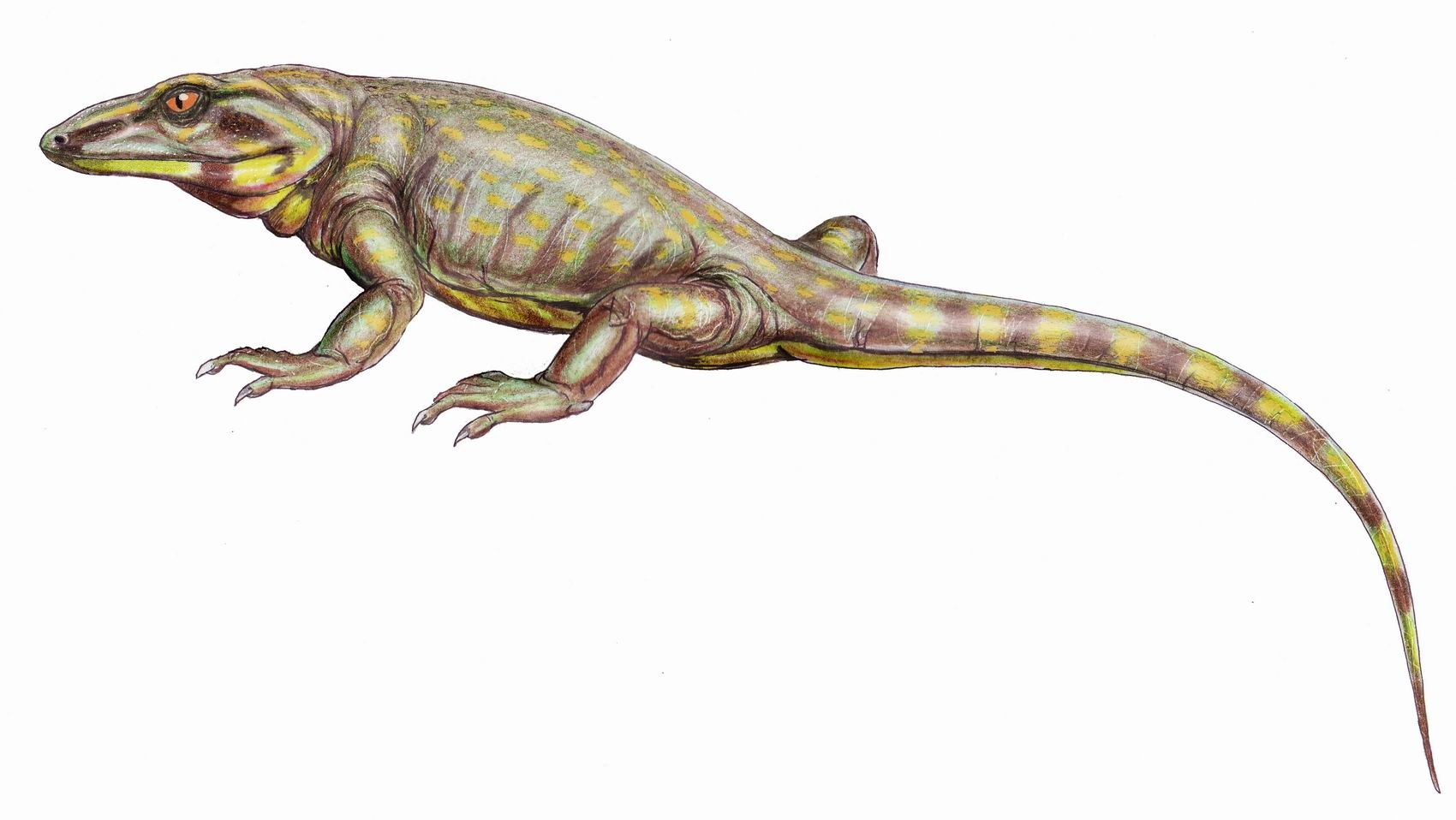
- Varanodon
  †Varanodon – type locality for genus
  - †Varanodon agilis – type locality for species
- †Varanops
  - †Varanops brevirostris – or unidentified comparable form
- †Veliberychia
- †Vermiporella – tentative report
- †Verrucosisporites
  - †Verrucosisporites grandiverrucosus
  - †Verrucosisporites microtuberosus
  - †Verrucosisporites verrucosus – or unidentified comparable form
- †Veryhachium
  - †Veryhachium bromidense
  - †Veryhachium irroratum
- †Vesicaspora
  - †Vesicaspora schemelii
  - †Vesicaspora wilsonii
- †Vestispora
  - †Vestispora fenestrata
  - †Vestispora foveata
  - †Vestispora pseudoreticulata
  - †Vestispora wanlessii
- †Victoriacystis
  - †Victoriacystis holmesorum – or unidentified related form
- †Villosacapsula
  - †Villosacapsula entriche
- †Vinella
  - †Vinella bilineata – type locality for species
- †Virginiata
  - †Virginiata arkansana
- †Vittatina
  - †Vittatina costabilis – type locality for species
  - †Vittatina lata – type locality for species
  - †Vittatina simplex
  - †Vittatina verrucosa
- †Vogdesia
  - †Vogdesia bromidensis
- †Voiseyella
  - †Voiseyella novamexicana

== W ==
- †Waagenella
  - †Waagenella crassus – or unidentified comparable form
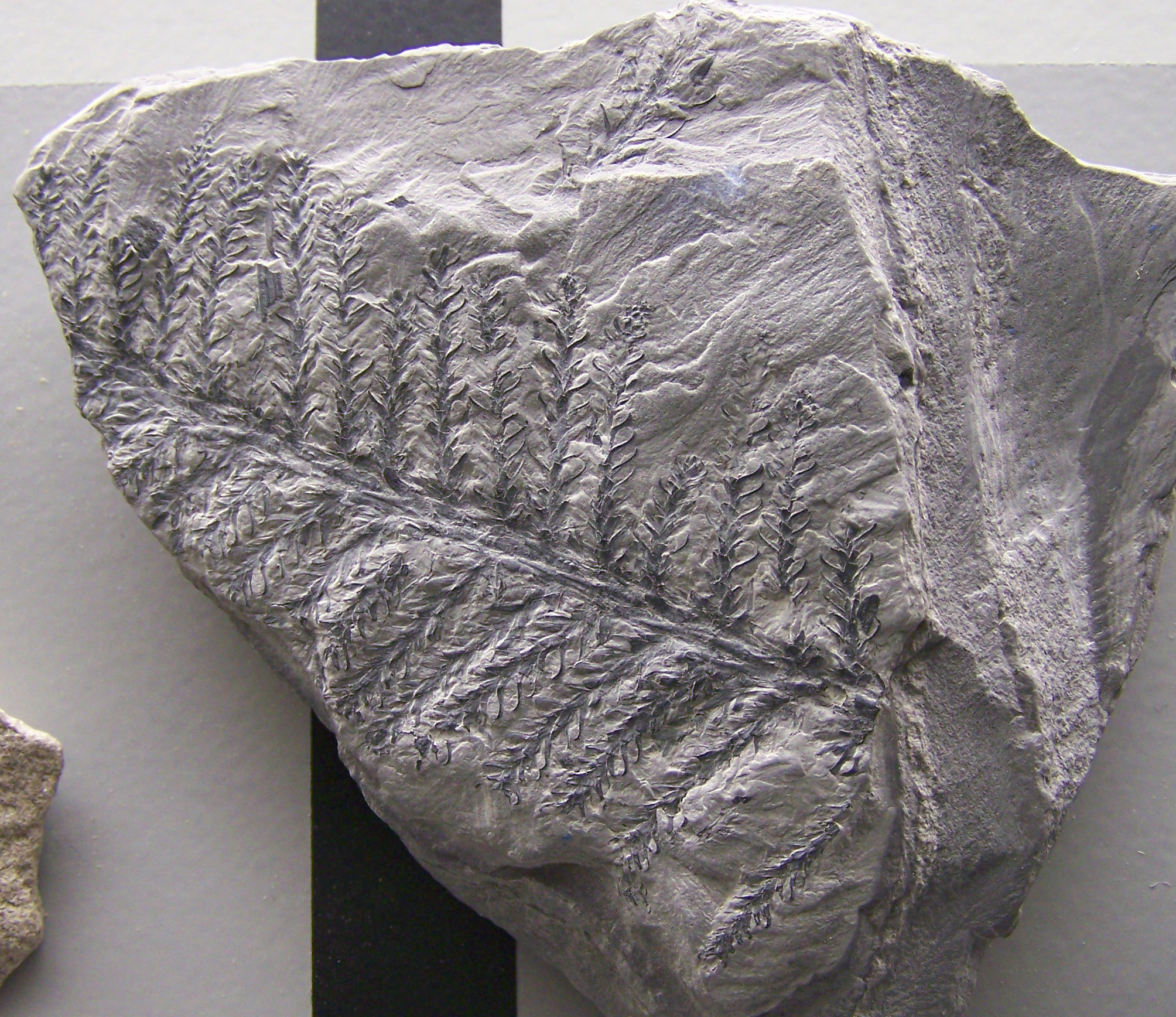
- Fossilized foliage of the Carboniferous-Permian conifer Walchia
  †Walchia
  - †Walchia gracilis – or unidentified comparable form
  - †Walchia imbricata – tentative report
- †Walliserodus
- †Watongia – type locality for genus
  - †Watongia meieri – type locality for species
- †Wedekindellina
- †Wellerella
- †Wellergyi
  - †Wellergyi brazerianum
- †Wellerites
  - †Wellerites mohri
- †Wewokella
  - †Wewokella solida
- †Wewokites
  - †Wewokites venatus
- †Whitspakia
  - †Whitspakia schucherti
- †Wichitoceras
  - †Wichitoceras crassum
  - †Wichitoceras decipiens
- †Wiedeyoceras
- †Wilkingia
  - †Wilkingia rothi
- †Wilsonites
  - †Wilsonites delicatus
  - †Wilsonites vesicatus
- †Winchellatina
  - †Winchellatina cornuta
  - †Winchellatina longispina
- †Worthenia
  - †Worthenia tabulata
- †Wurmiella
  - †Wurmiella excavata
  - †Wurmiella posthamata

== X ==
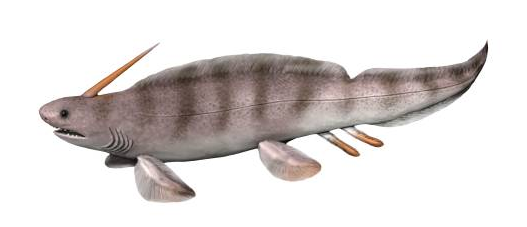
- Restoration of the Late Devonian–Triassic freshwater shark Xenacanthus
  †Xenacanthus

== Y ==
- †Yochelsonospira
  - †Yochelsonospira thomasi – type locality for species
- Yoldia
- †Youngiella
  - †Youngiella wapanuckensis – type locality for species

== Z ==
- †Zaphrentites
  - †Zaphrentites arkansanus
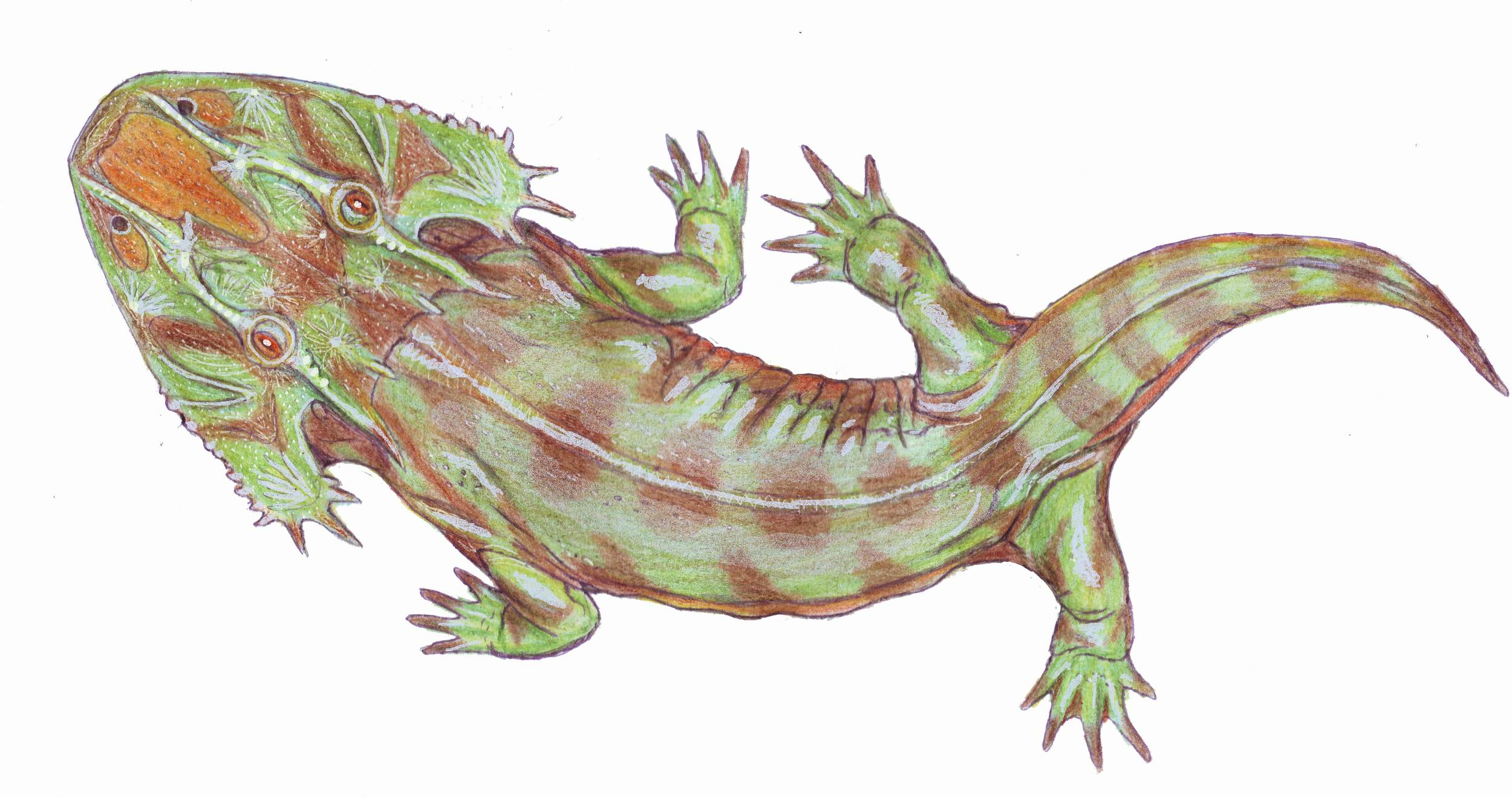
- Life restoration of the Permian amphibian Zatrachys
  †Zatrachys
  - †Zatrachys serratus
- †Zeilleria
- †Zelophyllum
- †Zenocrinus
  - †Zenocrinus zeus – type locality for species
- †Zonalasporites
  - †Zonalasporites punctaticus – type locality for species
  - †Zonalasporites punctatus
- †Zophocrinus
  - †Zophocrinus angulatus
- †Zosterosporites
  - †Zosterosporites triangularis
- †Zygopleura
- †Zygopteris
  - †Zygopteris illinoiensis
