= List of the prehistoric life of Oklahoma =

This list of the prehistoric life of Oklahoma contains the various prehistoric life-forms whose fossilized remains have been reported from within the US state of Oklahoma.

== Precambrian ==
The Paleobiology Database records no known occurrences of Precambrian fossils in Oklahoma.

== Paleozoic ==
=== Selected Paleozoic taxa of Oklahoma ===
- †Abyssomedon – type locality for genus
  - †Abyssomedon williamsi – type locality for species
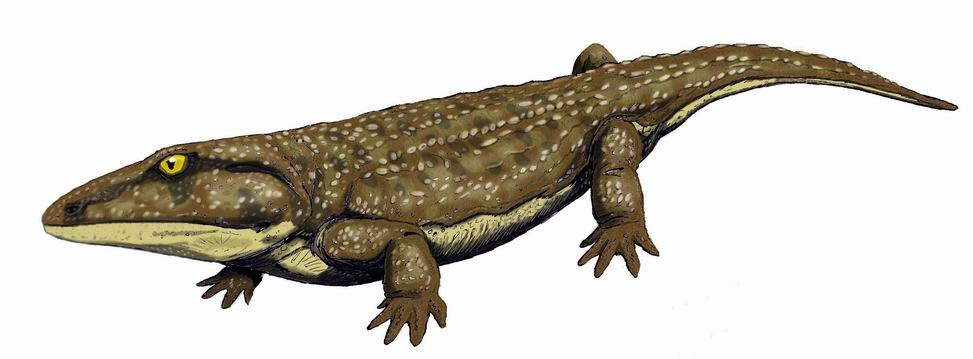
- Restoration of the Permian amphibian Acheloma
  †Acheloma
  - †Acheloma cumminsi – or unidentified comparable form
  - †Acheloma dunni – type locality for species
- †Acleistorhinus – type locality for genus
  - †Acleistorhinus pteroticus – type locality for species
- †Albertoceras
- †Alethopteris
  - †Alethopteris serlii
- †Alexandrinia
  - †Alexandrinia directa – type locality for species
- Ammodiscus
- †Amphiscapha
- †Anabathra
- †Ananaspis
- †Anataphrus
- †Angelosaurus
  - †Angelosaurus romeri – type locality for species
- † Anisophyllum
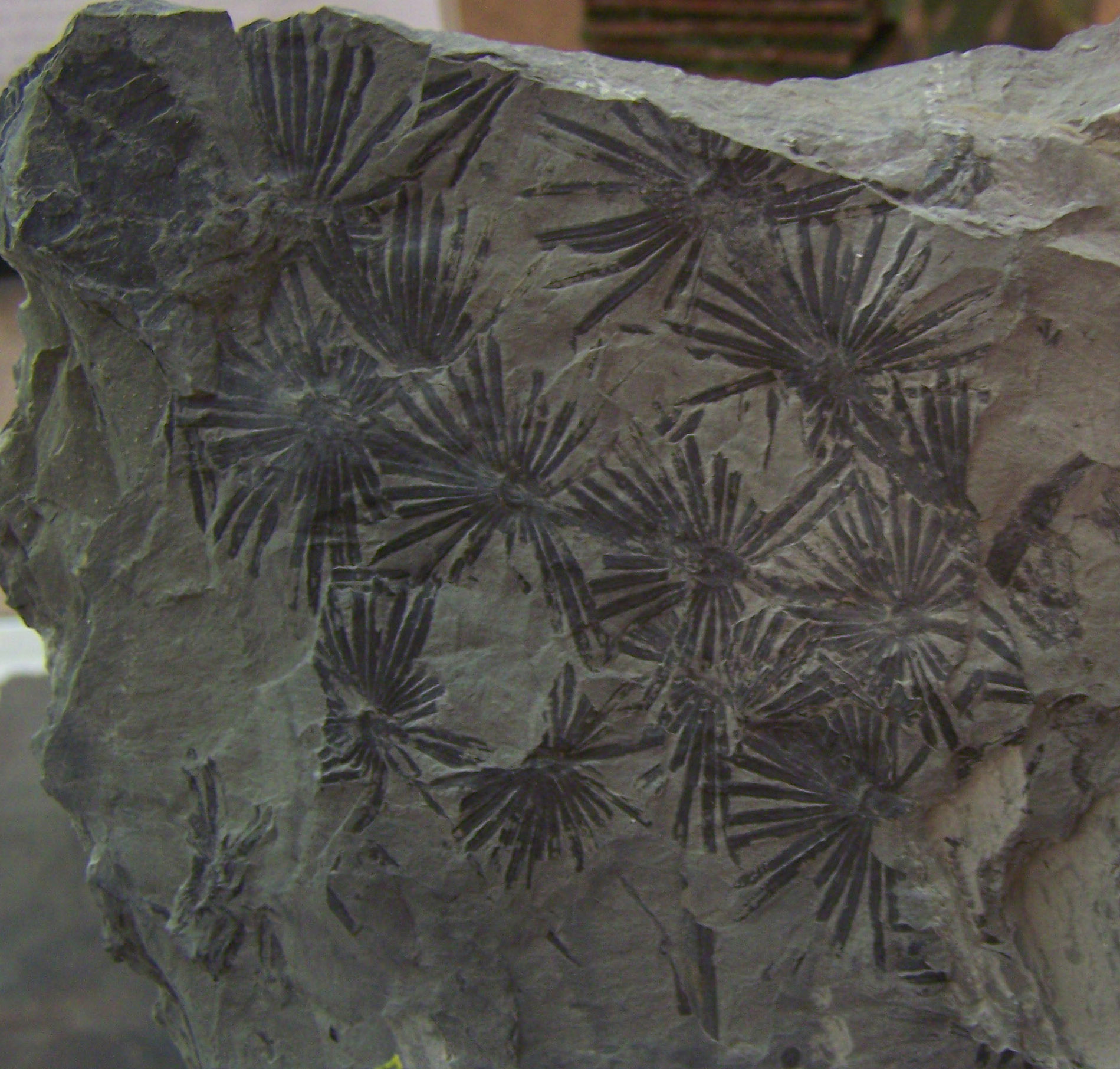
- Fossil of the Carboniferous horsetail relative Annularia
  †Annularia
  - †Annularia sphenophylloides
  - †Annularia stellata
- †Anomphalus
- †Anthracoceras
- †Aphlebia
- †Archaeocidaris
- Archaeolithophyllum
- †Archeria
- †Archimedes
  - †Archimedes distans
  - †Archimedes meekanoides
  - †Archimedes meekanus – or unidentified comparable form
- †Arkanites
- †Aspidosaurus – or unidentified comparable form
- †Athyris
- †Atrypa
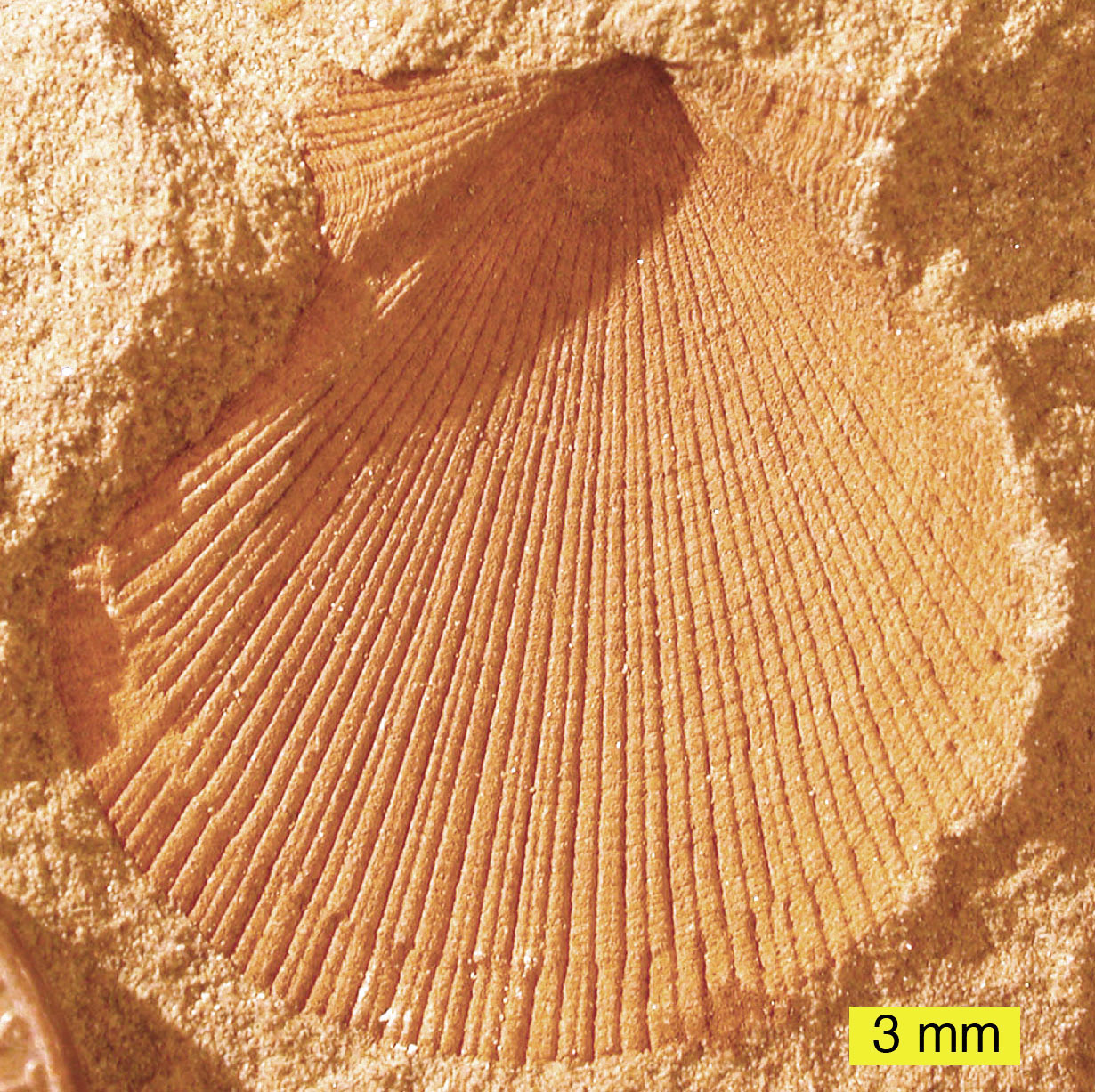
- Mold fossil of a shell of the Early Devonian-Late Triassic bivalve Aviculopecten
  †Aviculopecten
  - †Aviculopecten halensis
  - †Aviculopecten multilineatus
  - †Aviculopecten nodocosta – type locality for species
- †Avonia – tentative report
- †Axinolobus
- †Baeotherates – type locality for genus
  - †Baeotherates fortsillensis – type locality for species
- †Bellerophon
- †Benthamaspis
- †Bicornella
- †Bilinguites
- †Bisatoceras – type locality for genus
- †Bolbocephalus
- †Bolosaurus
  - †Bolosaurus grandis – type locality for species
  - †Bolosaurus striatus
- †Bolterpeton – type locality for genus
- †Bothriocidaris
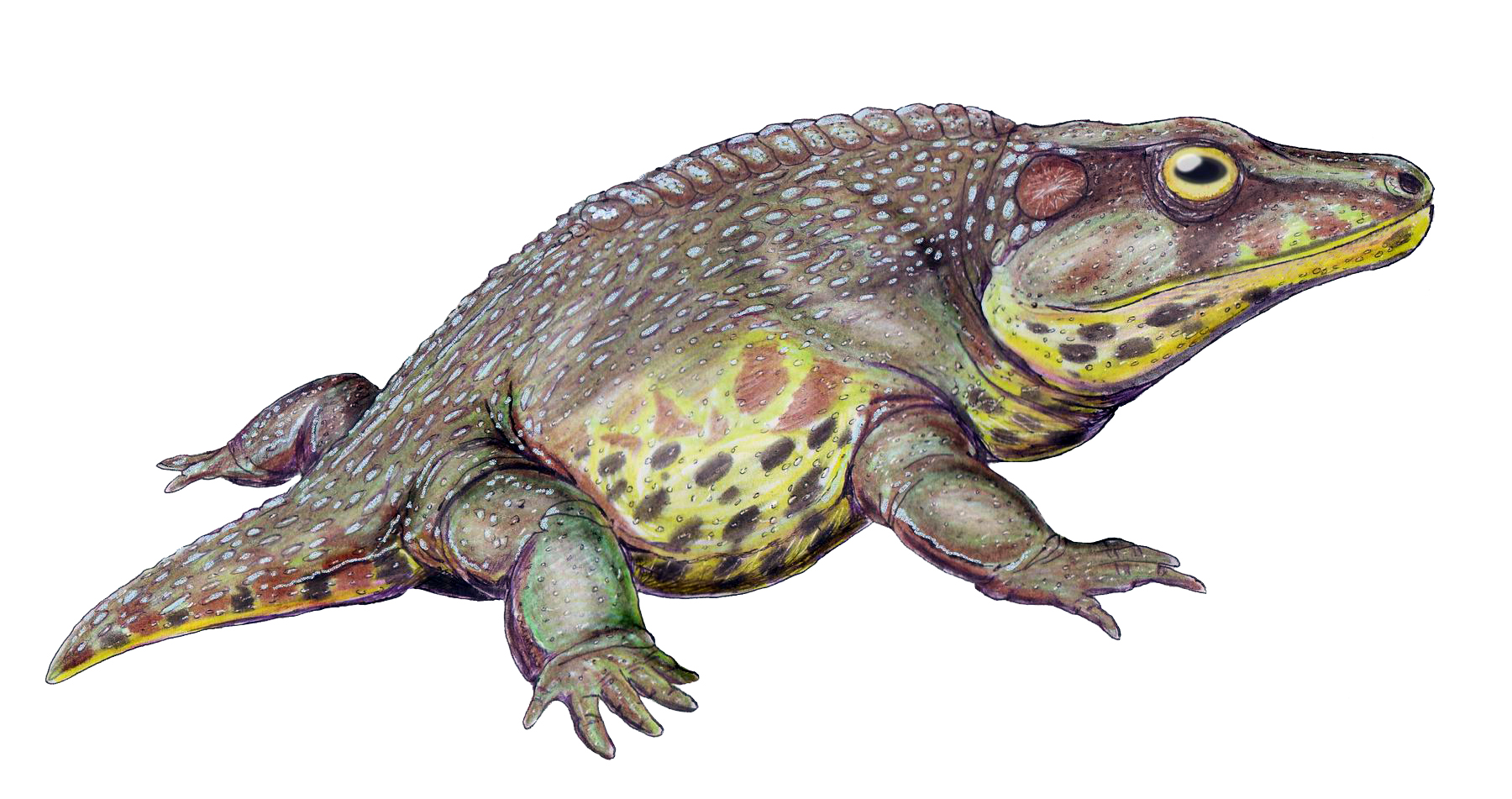
- Life restoration of the Permian amphibian Cacops
  †Cacops
  - †Cacops morrisi – type locality for species
  - †Cacops woehri – type locality for species
- †Calamites
- †Callipteris
- †Calymene
  - †Calymene clavicula
- †Calyptaulax
- †Camarotoechia
- † Camerate
- †Campbelloceras
- †Cancelloceras
- †Capnophyllum
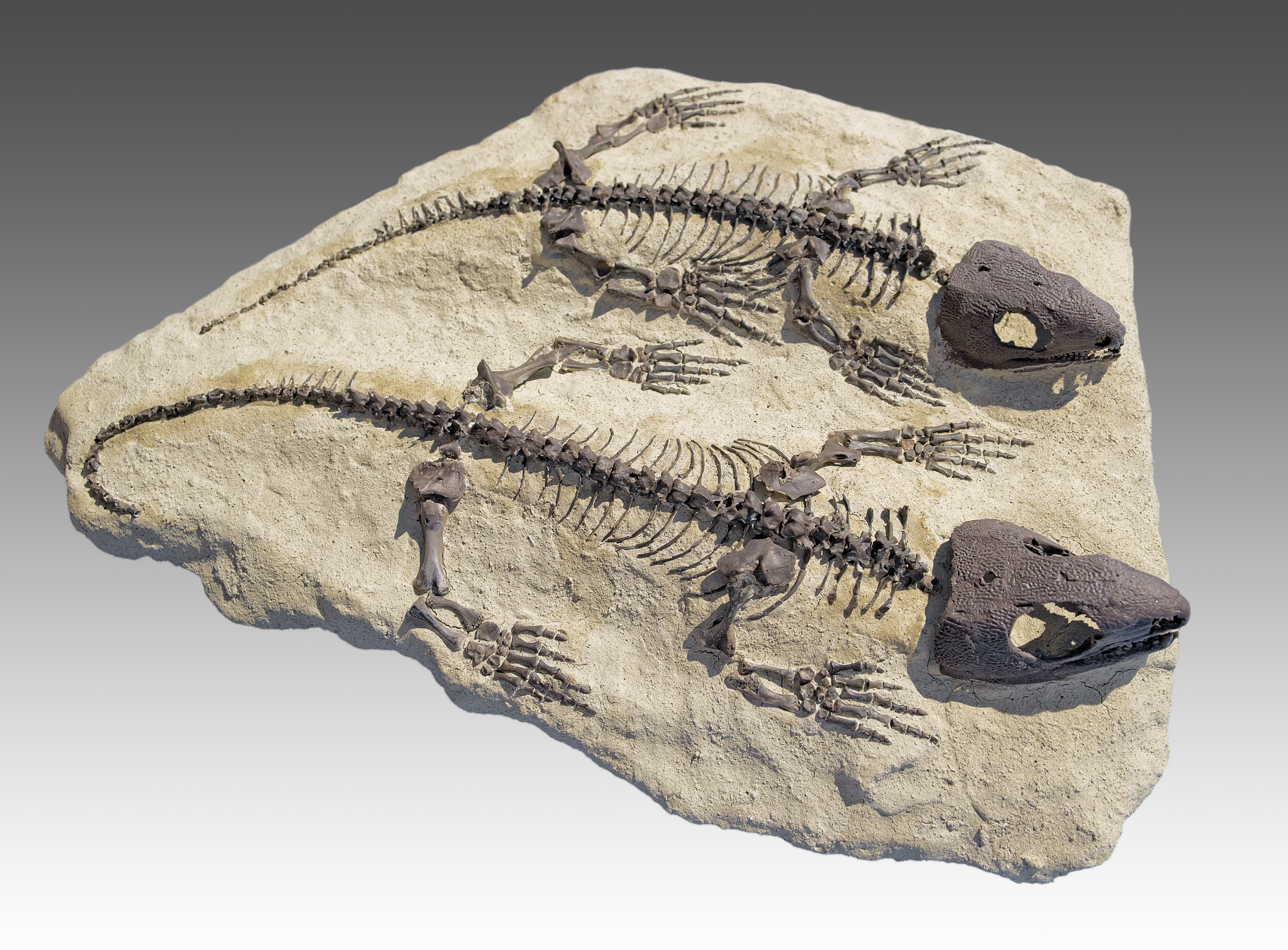
- Fossilized skeletons of the Permian reptile Captorhinus
  †Captorhinus
  - †Captorhinus aguti
- †Cardiocephalus
  - †Cardiocephalus peabodyi – type locality for species
  - †Cardiocephalus sternbergi – or unidentified comparable form
- †Carolinites
- †Ceramopora
- †Ceratiocaris
- †Ceratocephala
- †Ceraurinella
- †Ceraurus
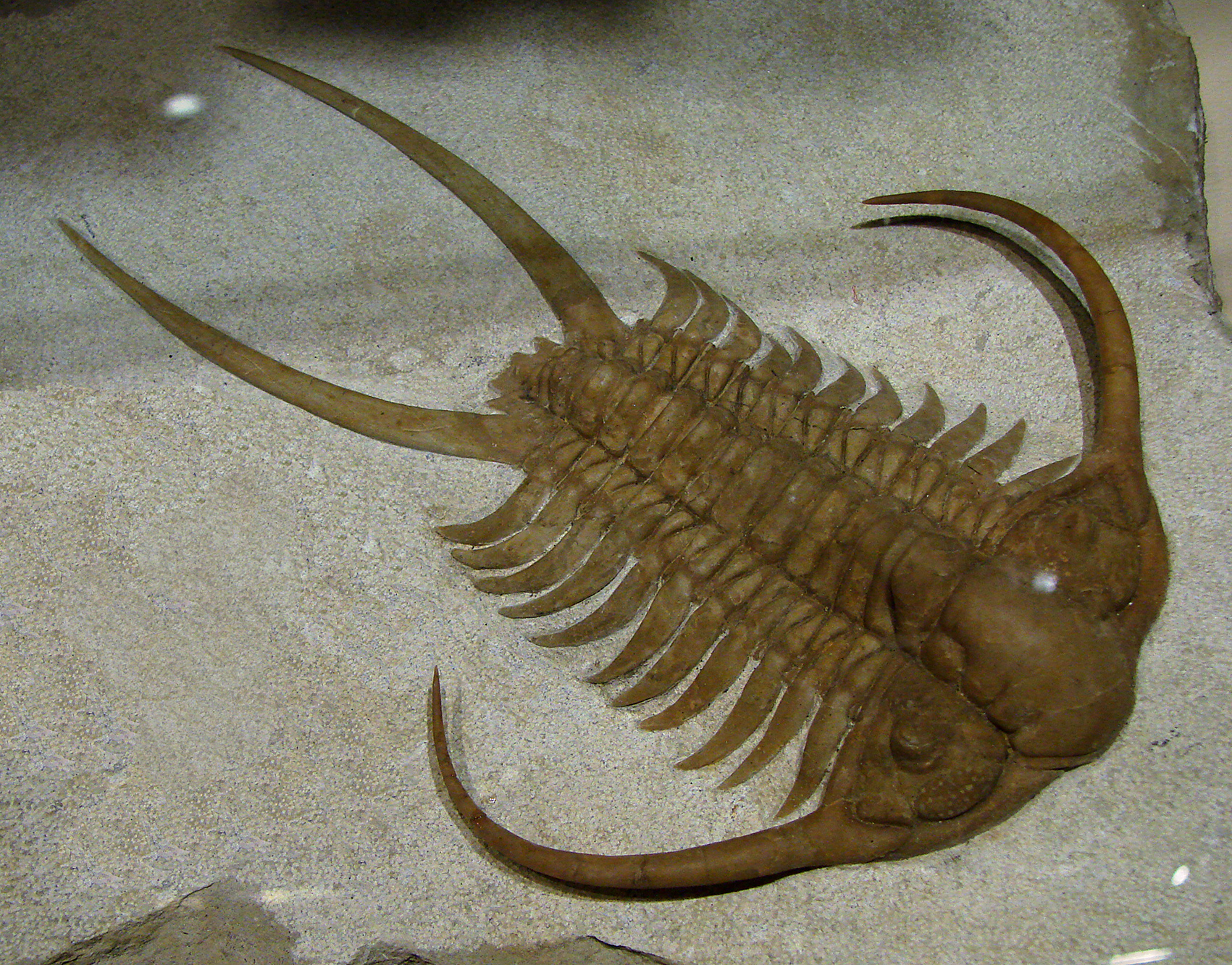
- Fossil of the Cambrian-Middle Devonian trilobite Cheirurus
  †Cheirurus
- †Chonetes
  - †Chonetes mesoloba
- †Cladochonus
- †Cleiothyridina
  - †Cleiothyridina orbicularis
- †Clepsydrops
- Cliona
- †Colobomycter – type locality for genus
  - †Colobomycter pholeter – type locality for species
- †Composita
  - †Composita mexicana
  - †Composita rotunda
  - †Composita subcircularis
  - †Composita subtilita
- †Coolinia
- †Cordania
  - †Cordania falcata
- †Cordylodus
- †Cornulites
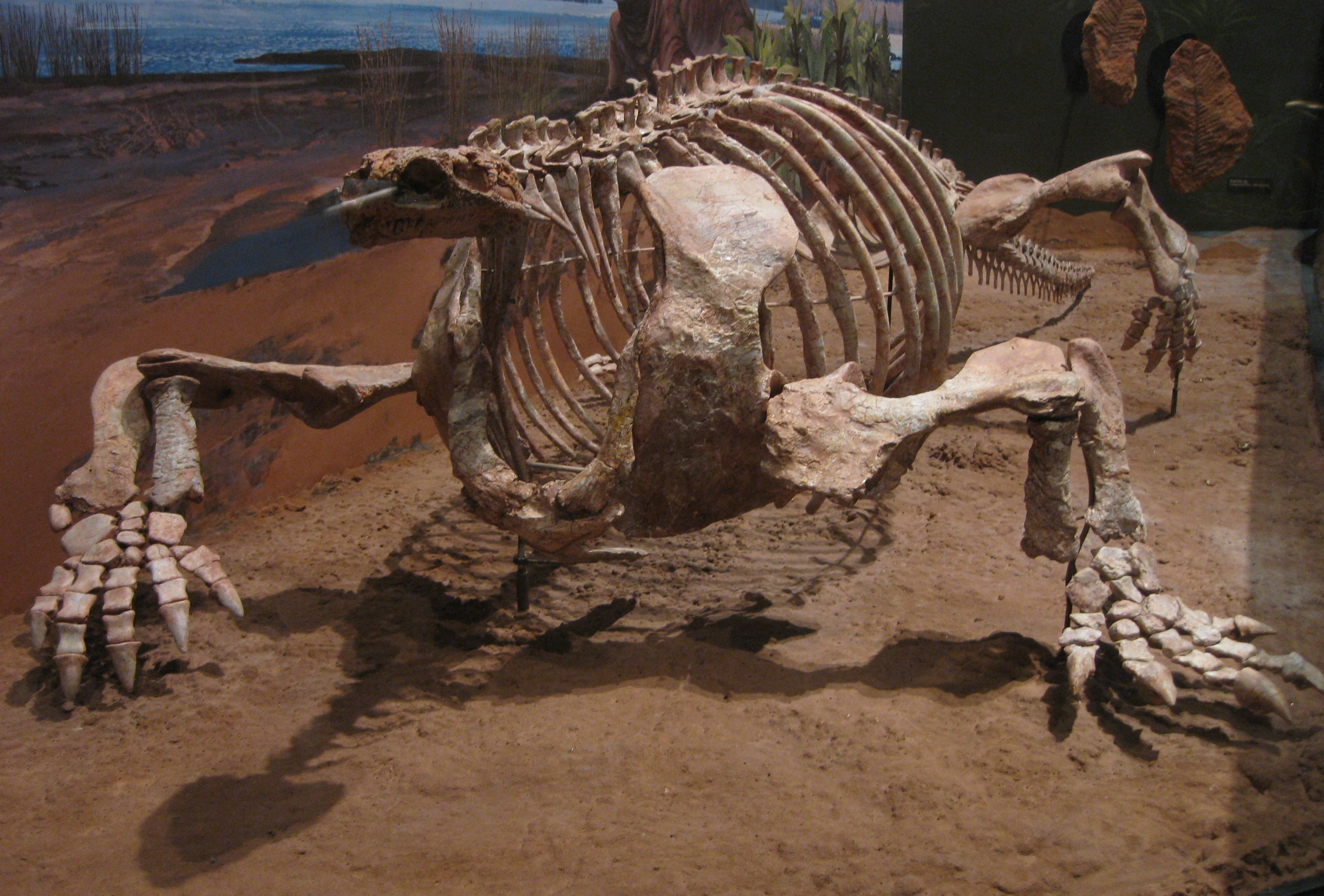
- Mounted fossilized skeleton of the Permian synapsid (mammal precursor) Cotylorhynchus
  †Cotylorhynchus – type locality for genus
  - †Cotylorhynchus bransoni – type locality for species
  - †Cotylorhynchus romeri – type locality for species
- Crania
- †Craniops
- †Cravenoceras
- †Cricotus
- †Crossotelos – type locality for genus
- †Ctenacanthus – report made of unidentified related form or using admittedly obsolete nomenclature
- †Curtognathus
- †Cybelopsis
- †Cycloceras
- †Cyclonema
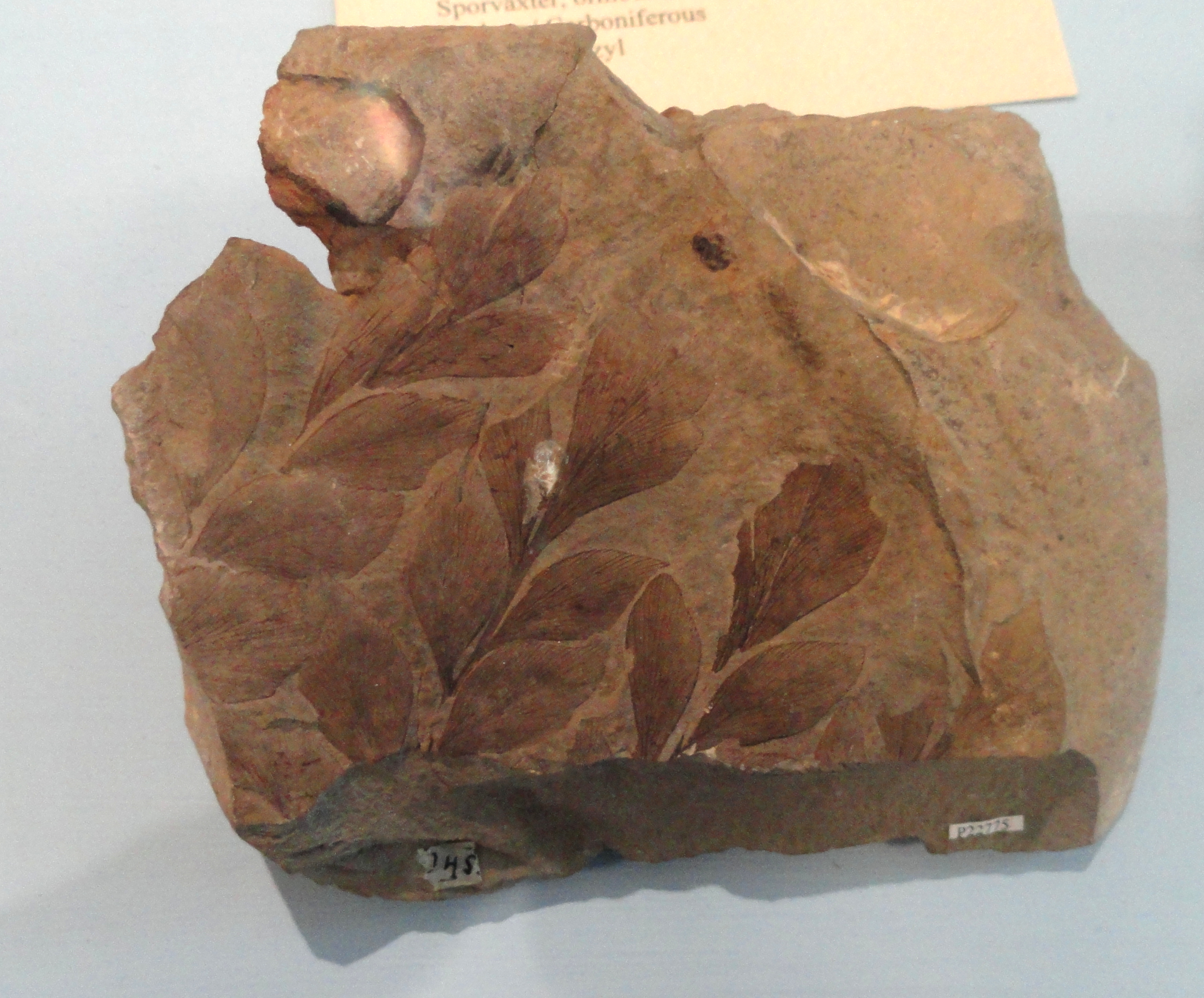
- Fossilized foliage from the Carboniferous seed fern Cyclopteris
  †Cyclopteris
- †Cyphaspis
- †Cyrtograptus
- †Cystodictya
  - †Cystodictya elegans – type locality for species
- †Dalmanites
- †Delorhynchus – type locality for genus
  - †Delorhynchus cifellii – type locality for species
  - †Delorhynchus priscus – type locality for species
- †Diacalymene
- †Diadectes
- †Dicoelosia
- †Dicranurus
  - †Dicranurus hamatus
- †Dictyonema
- †Dimeropygiella
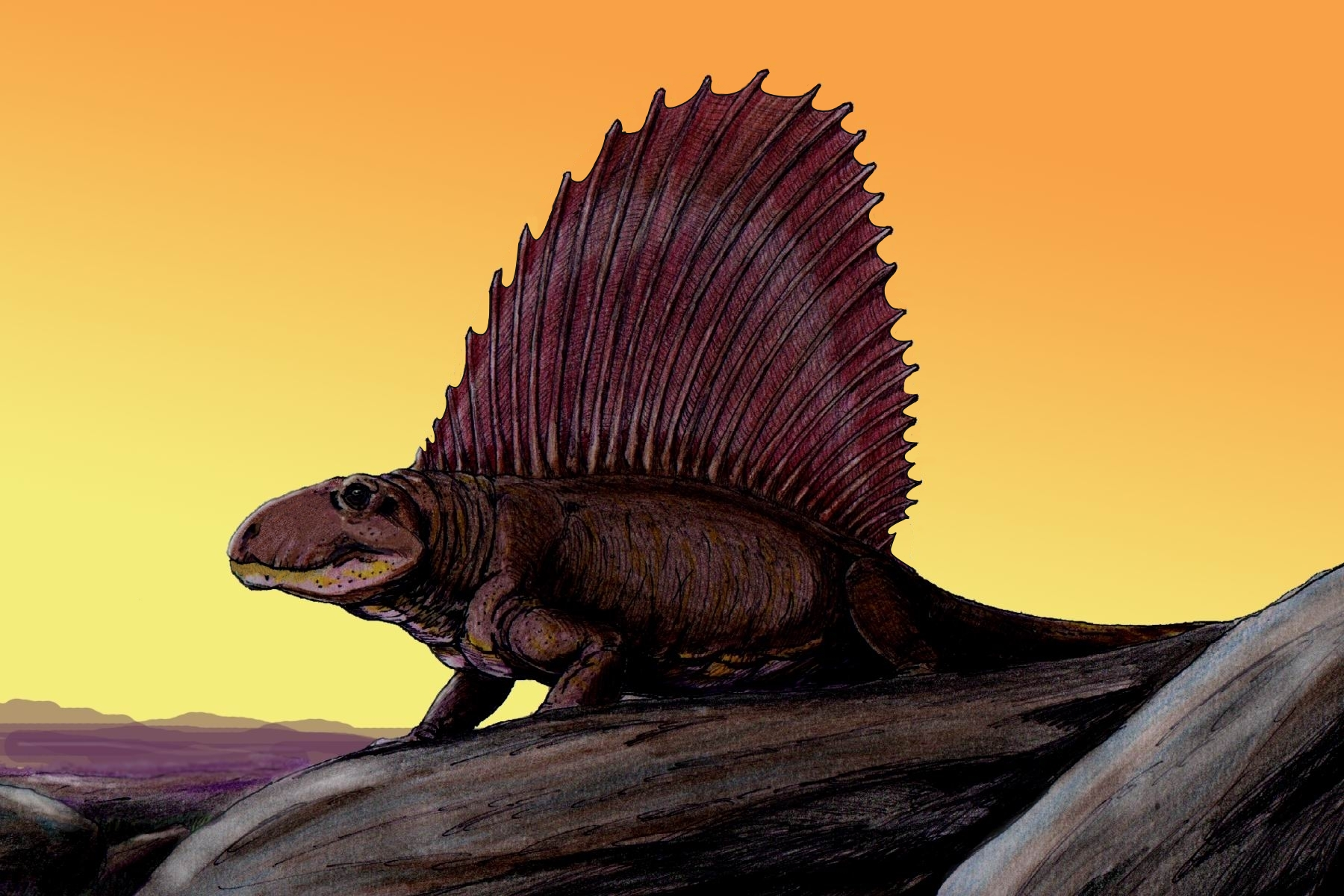
- Life restoration of the Permian synapsid (mammal precursor) Dimetrodon
  †Dimetrodon
  - †Dimetrodon dollovianus
  - †Dimetrodon limbatus – or unidentified comparable form
  - †Dimetrodon loomisi
  - †Dimetrodon macrospondylus
- †Diplocaulus – type locality for genus
  - †Diplocaulus magnicornis
- †Diplograptus
- †Discitoceras
- †Doleserpeton – type locality for genus
- †Domatoceras
- †Eatonia
- †Echinaria
- †Echinosphaerites
- †Ectosteorhachis
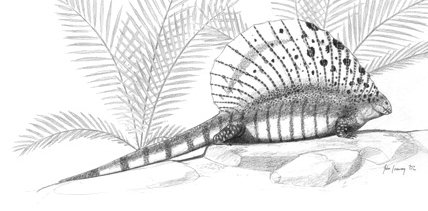
- Life restoration of the Carboniferous-Permian synapsid (mammal precursor) Edaphosaurus
  †Edaphosaurus
  - †Edaphosaurus cruciger
- †Edestus – type locality for genus
- †Edmondia
- †Eodictyonella
- †Eospirifer
- †Epiphyton
- †Eryops
  - †Eryops megacephalus
- †Estheria
- †Eucalyptocrinites
- †Euryodus
  - †Euryodus dalyae – type locality for species
  - †Euryodus primus – or unidentified comparable form
- †Favosites
- †Fayella – type locality for genus
- †Feeserpeton – type locality for genus
  - †Feeserpeton oklahomensis – type locality for species
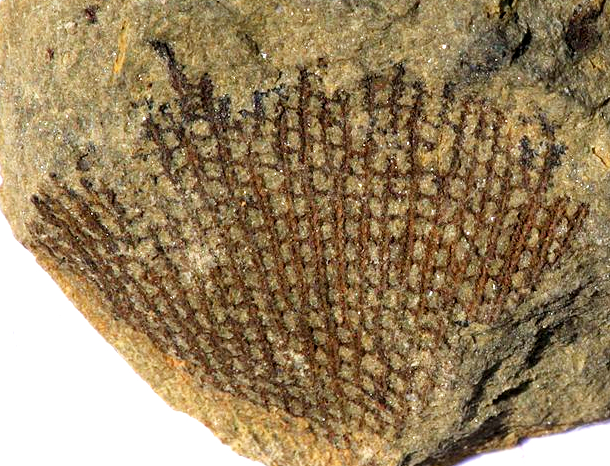
- Fossil of the Middle Ordovician-Late Triassic bryozoan ("moss animal") Fenestella
  †Fenestella
  - †Fenestella cestriensis
  - †Fenestella exigua
- †Foerstia
- †Fragiscutum
- †Frencrinuroides
- †Fusulina
- †Gastrioceras
- †Girvanella
- †Glaphurochiton
- †Glyptopleura
- †Gnathodus
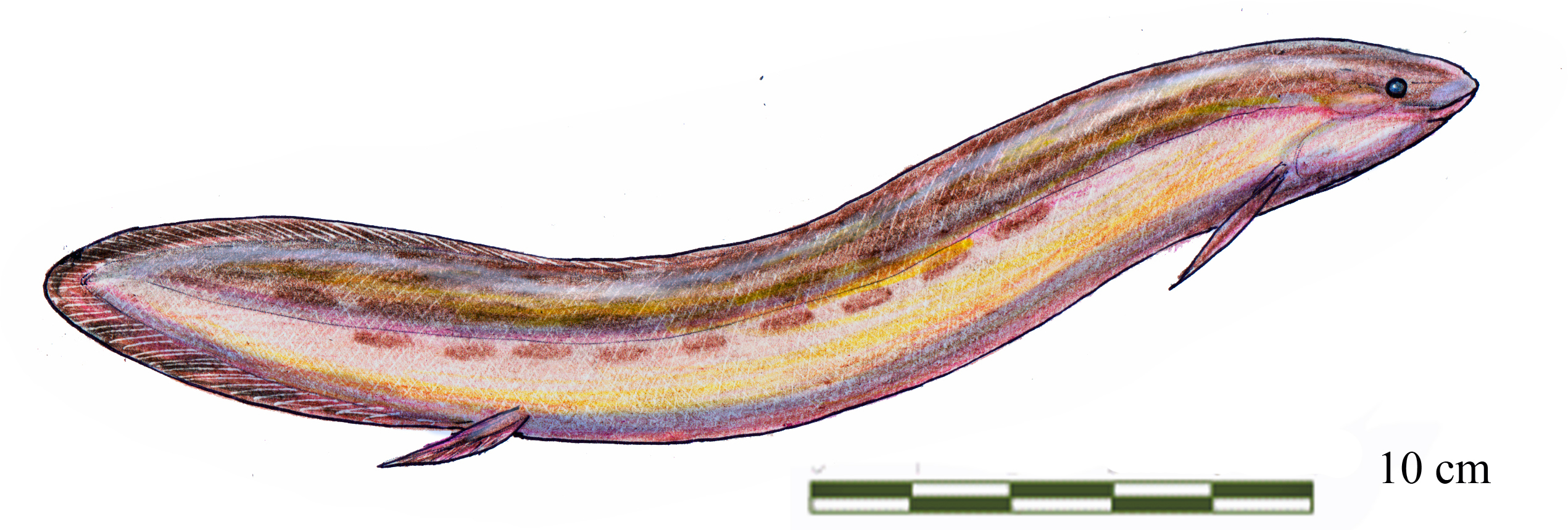
- Life restoration of the Permian lungfish Gnathorhiza
  †Gnathorhiza
- †Goniatites
- †Gotlandochiton
- †Gymnophyllum
  - †Gymnophyllum wardi
- †Hallopora
- †Halysites
- †Hapsidopareion – type locality for genus
  - †Hapsidopareion lepton – type locality for species
- †Helminthochiton
- †Hibbertia
- †Hindia
- †Holopea – tentative report
- †Huntoniatonia
- †Idiognathodus
- †Illaenus
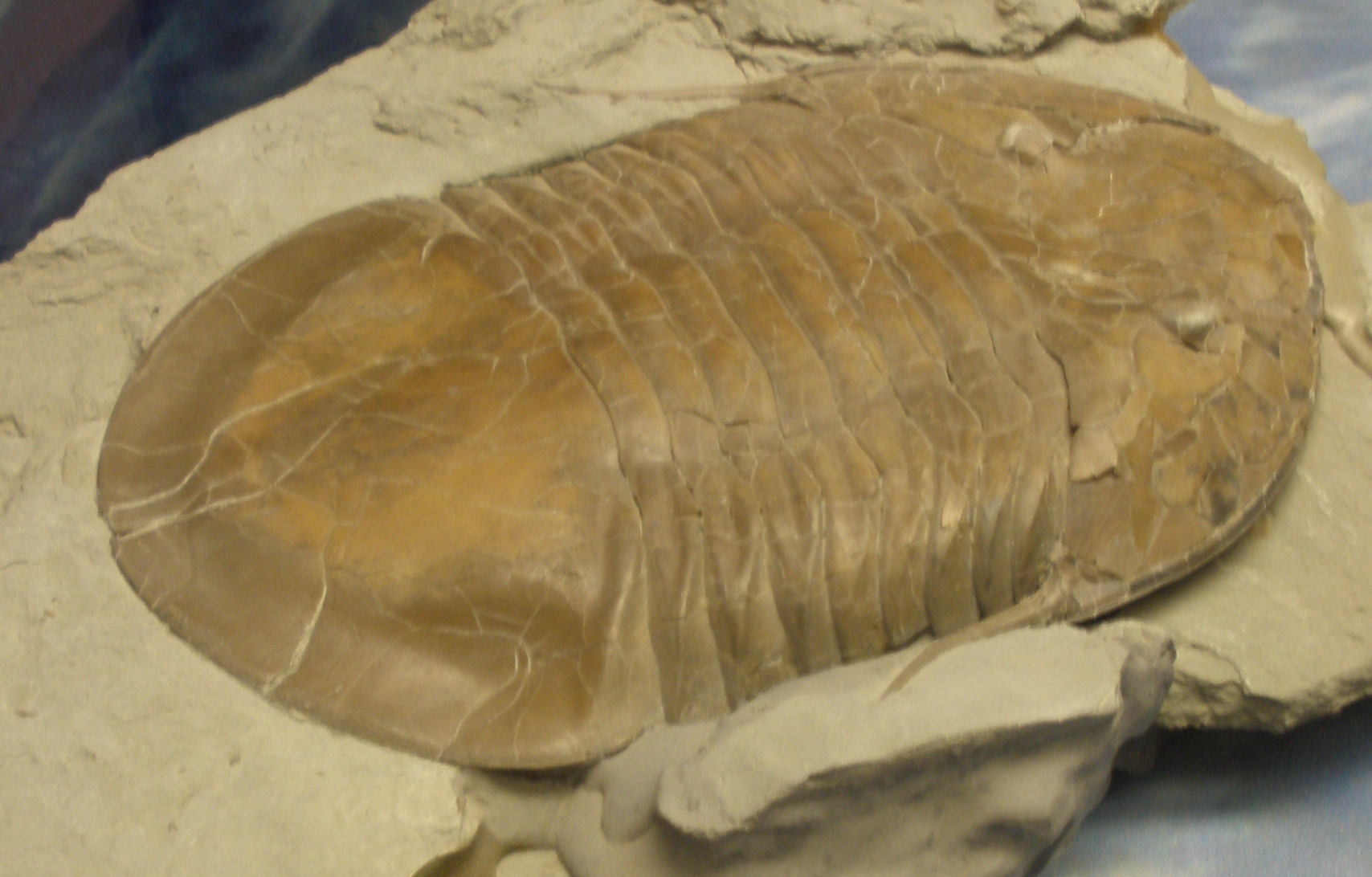
- Fossil of the Middle-Late Ordovician giant trilobite Isotelus.
  †Isotelus
- †Ivoechiton
- †Jeffersonia
- †Kainops
- †Kawina
- †Kennedya
- †Kockelella
- †Krausella
- †Labidosaurikos – type locality for genus
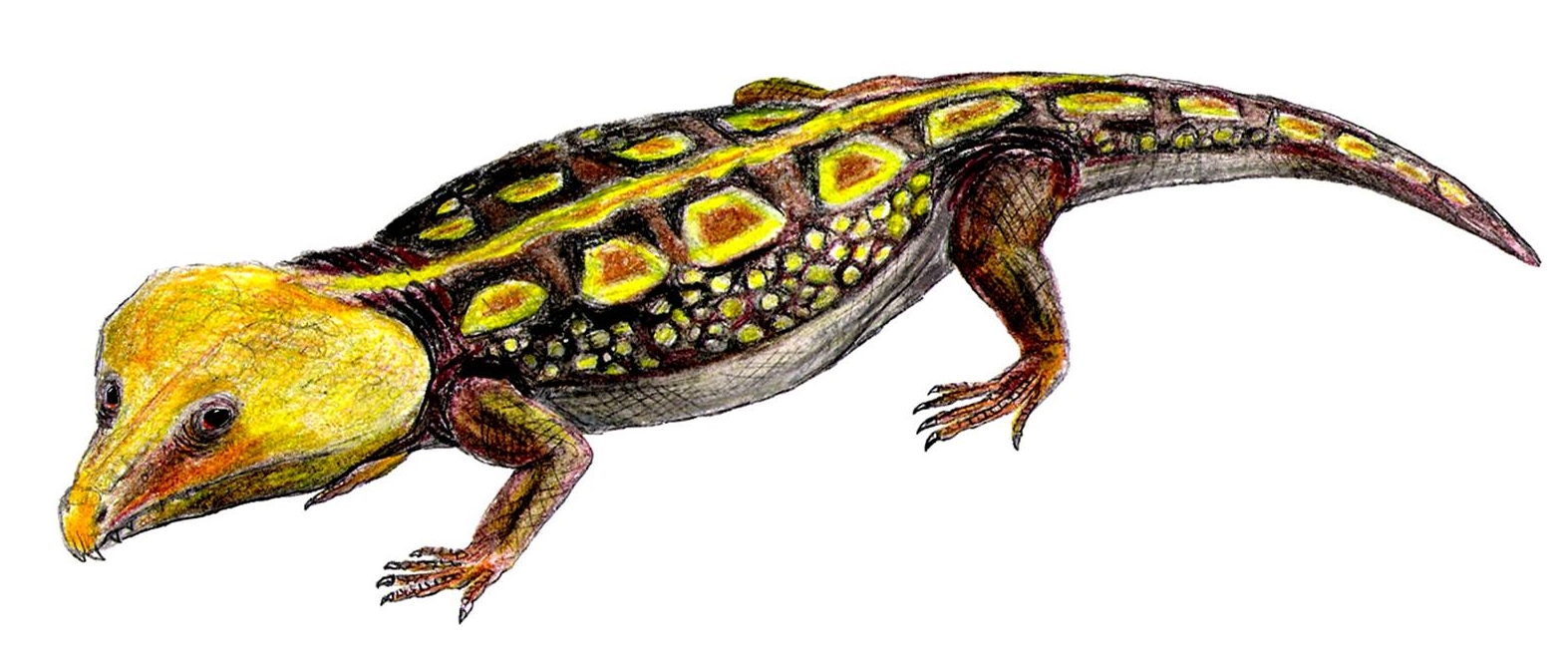
- Life restoration of the Permian reptile Labidosaurus
  †Labidosaurus
- †Leonaspis
- †Lepidodendron
- Lingula
- †Lingulella
- †Liroceras
- †Lisca
- Lithophaga
- †Llistrofus – type locality for genus
- †Lonchodomas
- †Lutesvillia
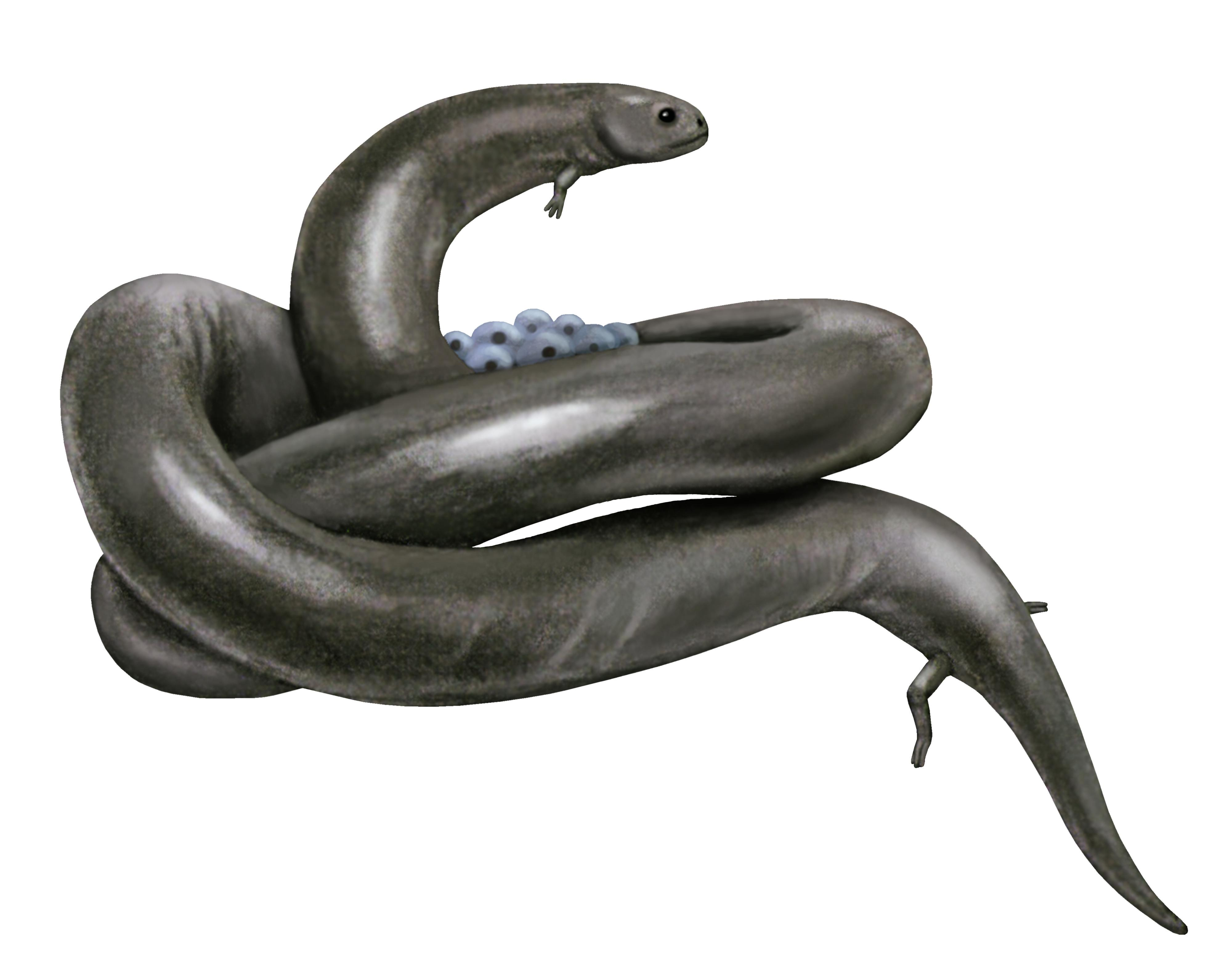
- Life restoration of the Permian snake-like amphibian Lysorophus showing speculative egg-coiling behavior
  †Lysorophus
- †Macroleter
  - †Macroleter agilis – type locality for species
- †Marsupiocrinus
- †Maximites
- †Mcqueenoceras
- †Meganeuropsis
- †Meristella
- †Meristina
- †Metacoceras
- †Michelinoceras
- †Micraroter – type locality for genus
  - †Micraroter erythrogeios – type locality for species
- †Microleter – type locality for genus
  - †Microleter mckinzieorum – type locality for species
- †Micula – tentative report
- †Misthodotes
- Modiolus
- †Monograptus
- †Moravia
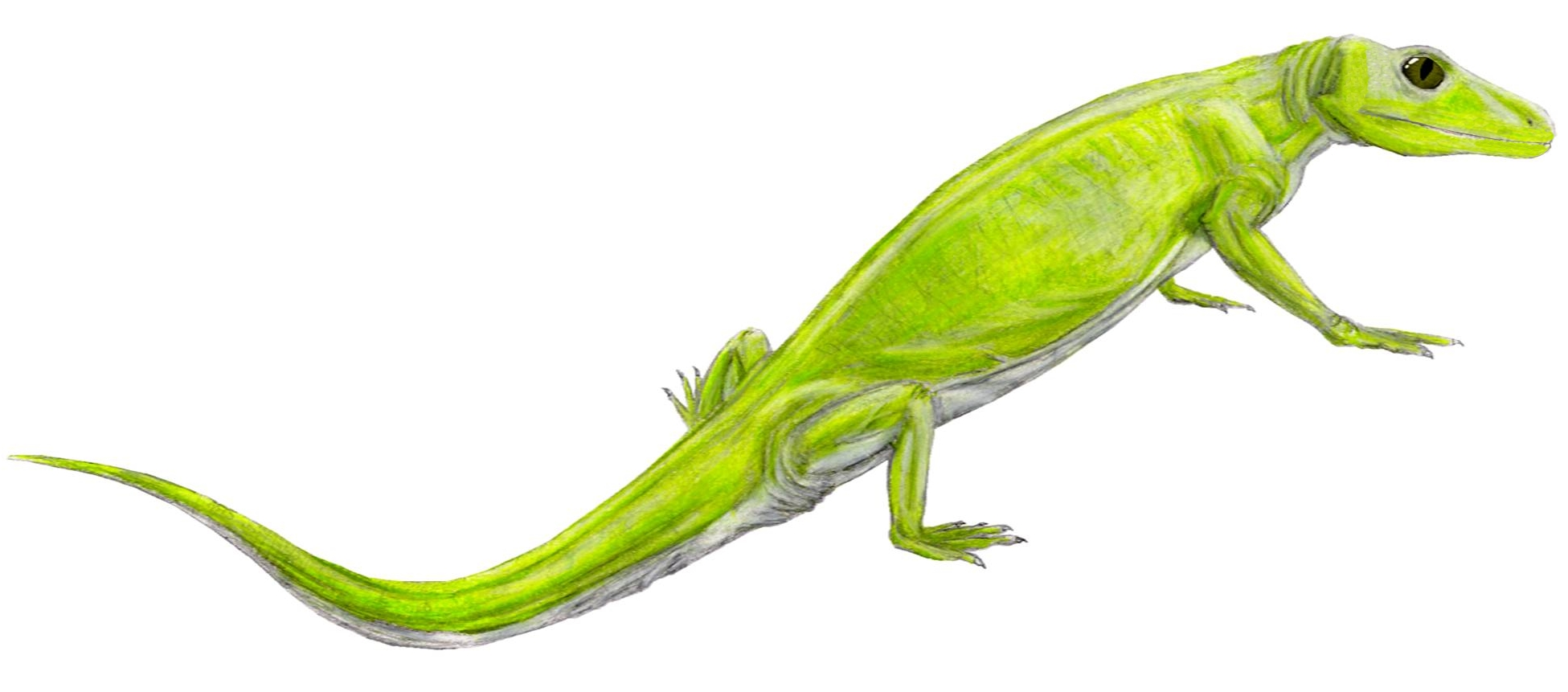
- Life restoration of the Permian synapsid (mammal precursor) Mycterosaurus
  †Mycterosaurus – type locality for genus
  - †Mycterosaurus longiceps – type locality for species
- †Nannaroter – type locality for genus
- †Nannospondylus – type locality for genus
- †Naticopsis
  - †Naticopsis transversa – type locality for species
- †Neospirifer
  - †Neospirifer dunbari
- †Neuropteris
  - †Neuropteris heterophylla
  - †Neuropteris obliqua
  - †Neuropteris rarinervis
- Nucula
- †Odontochile
- †Oinochoe
- † Oliveria
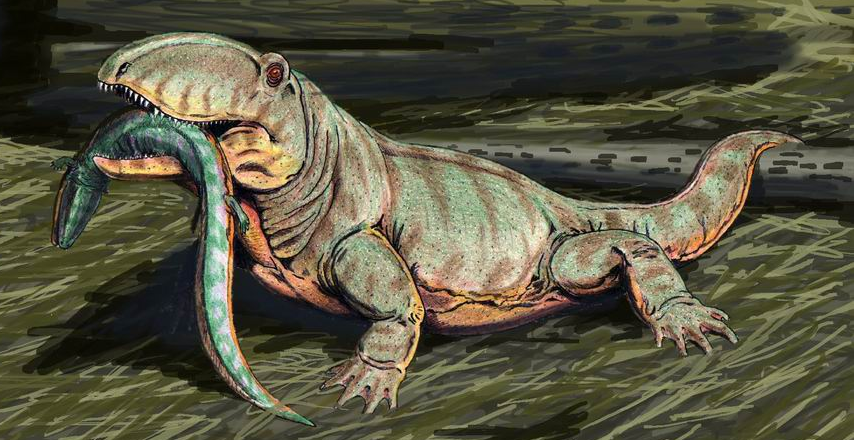
- Life restoration of the Carboniferous-Permian synapsid (mammal precursor) Ophiacodon
  †Ophiacodon
  - †Ophiacodon major
  - †Ophiacodon mirus – or unidentified comparable form
  - †Ophiacodon uniformis
- †Opisthodontosaurus – type locality for genus
- †Oromycter – type locality for genus
  - †Oromycter dolesorum – type locality for species
- †Orovenator – type locality for genus
  - †Orovenator mayorum – type locality for species
- †Orthacanthus
- †Orthoceras
- †Oulodus
- †Ozarkodina
  - †Ozarkodina confluens
- †Pachylyroceras
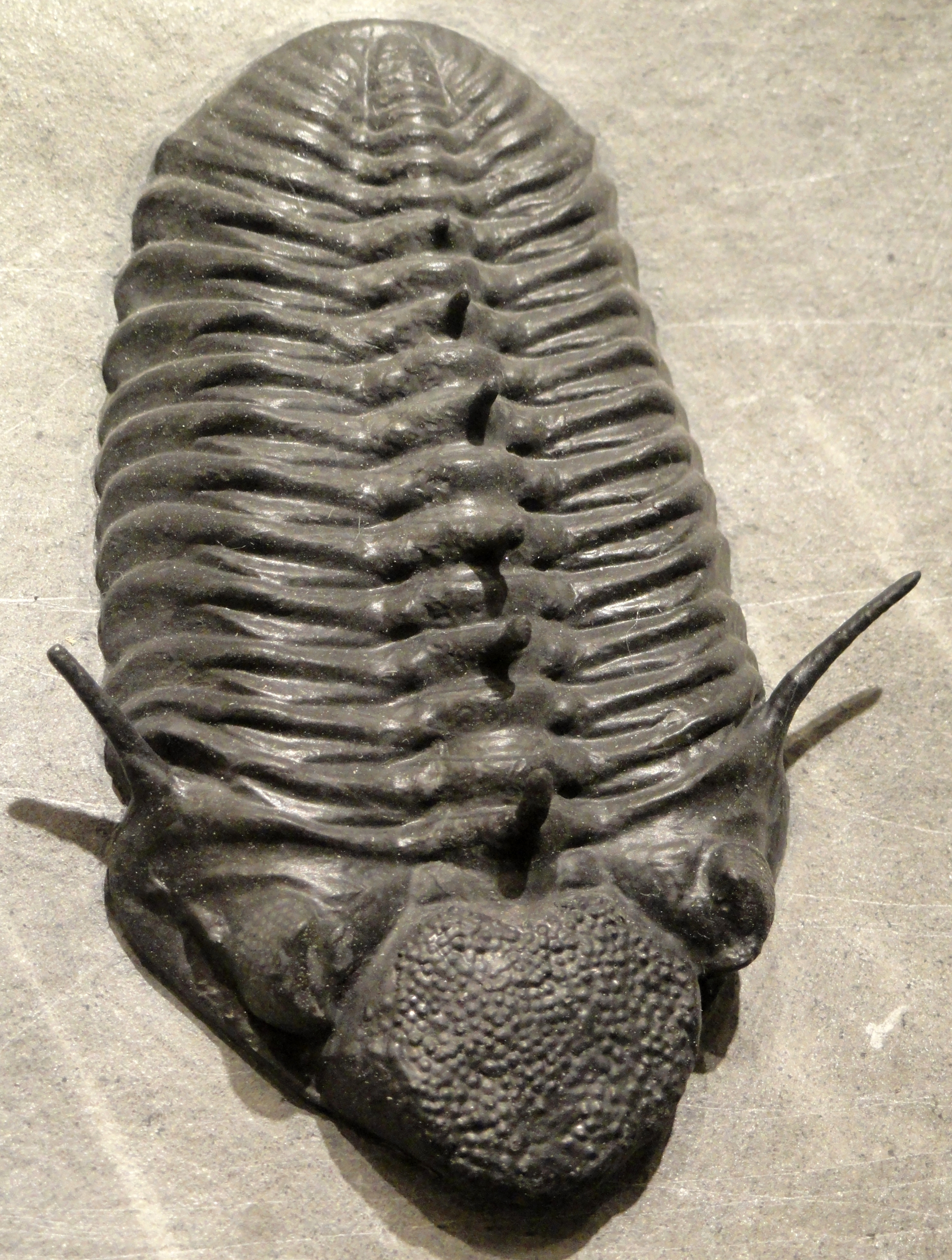
- Fossil of the trilobite Paciphacops
  †Paciphacops
- †Paladin
- Palaeoaplysina – tentative report
- †Paleochiton
- †Paralegoceras
- †Pasawioops – type locality for genus
- †Pecopteris
  - †Pecopteris hemitelioides
- †Pentremites
- †Peripetoceras
- †Perryella – type locality for genus
- †Petalodus
- †Phillipsia – tentative report
- †Phragmolites
- †Pinnularia
- †Plaesiomys
- †Platyceras
- †Platycrinites
- †Platysomus
- †Platystrophia
- †Plectodonta
- †Pleuracanthus
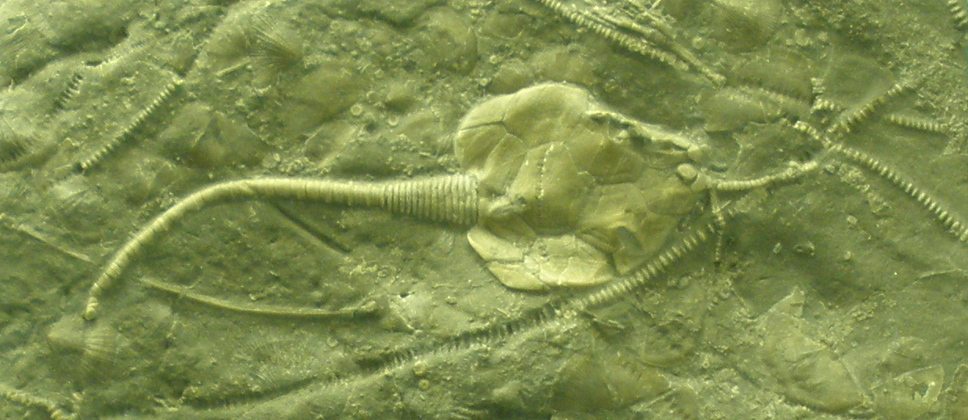
- Fossil of the Late Ordovician cystoid echinoderm Pleurocystites
  †Pleurocystites
- †Plicochonetes
- †Polygnathodella – type locality for genus
- †Polygnathus
- †Prioniodus
- †Prodentalium
- †Proetus
- †Protocaptorhinus
  - †Protocaptorhinus pricei
- †Punka
- †Rayella
- †Rayonnoceras
- †Reedops
- †Remopleurides
- †Reteocrinus
- †Rhopalia
- †Rhynchonkos
  - †Rhynchonkos stovalli – type locality for species
- Rogerella
- †Sagenodus
- †Sandia
- †Scytalocrinus
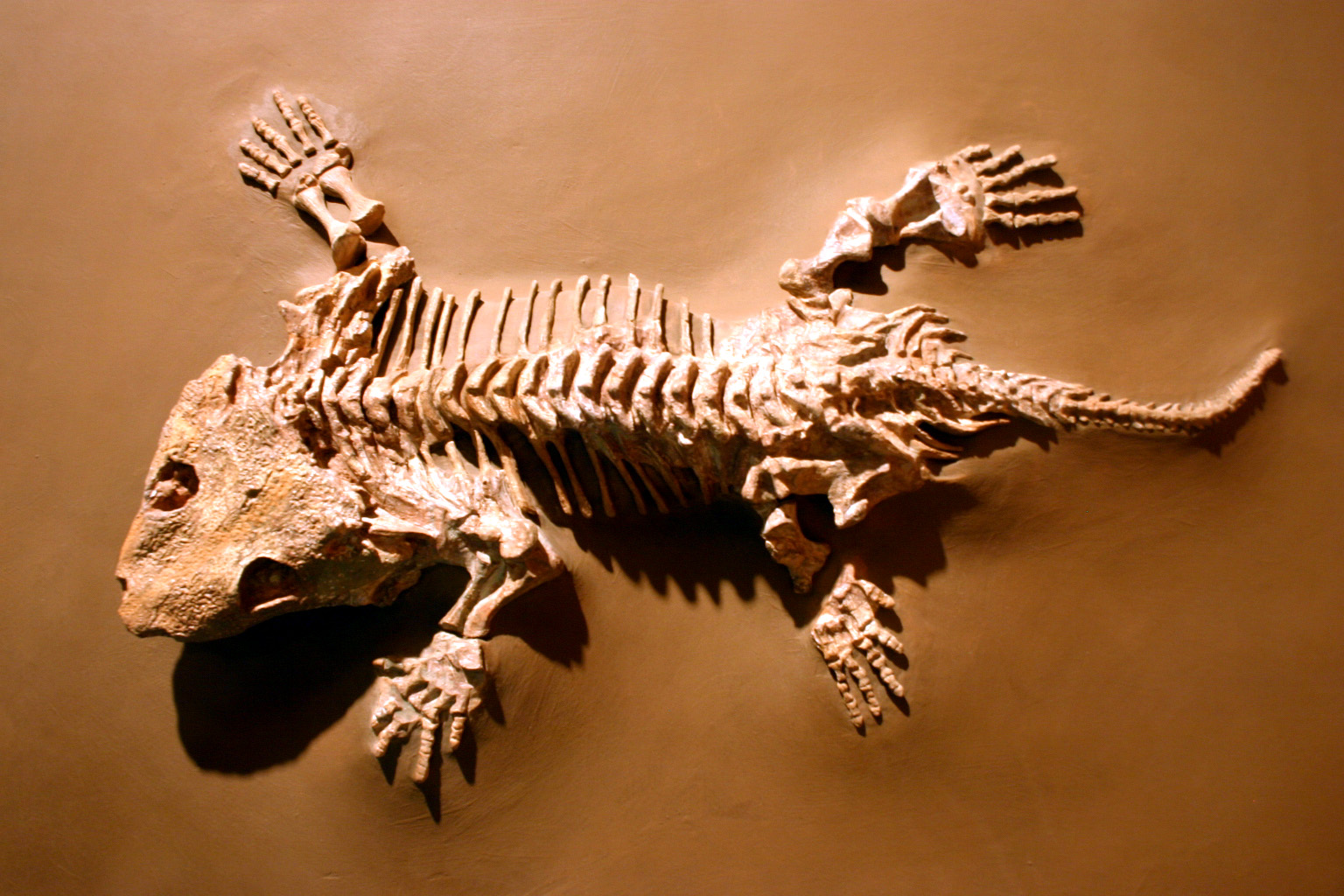
- Fossilized skeleton of the Permian primitive four-limbed animal Seymouria
  †Seymouria
  - †Seymouria baylorensis
- †Sigillaria
- †Sillerpeton – type locality for genus
- †Skenidioides
- Solecurtus
- Solemya – report made of unidentified related form or using admittedly obsolete nomenclature
- †Solenochilus
- †Solenomorpha – tentative report
- †Sowerbyella
- †Sphaerexochus
- †Sphaerocoryphe
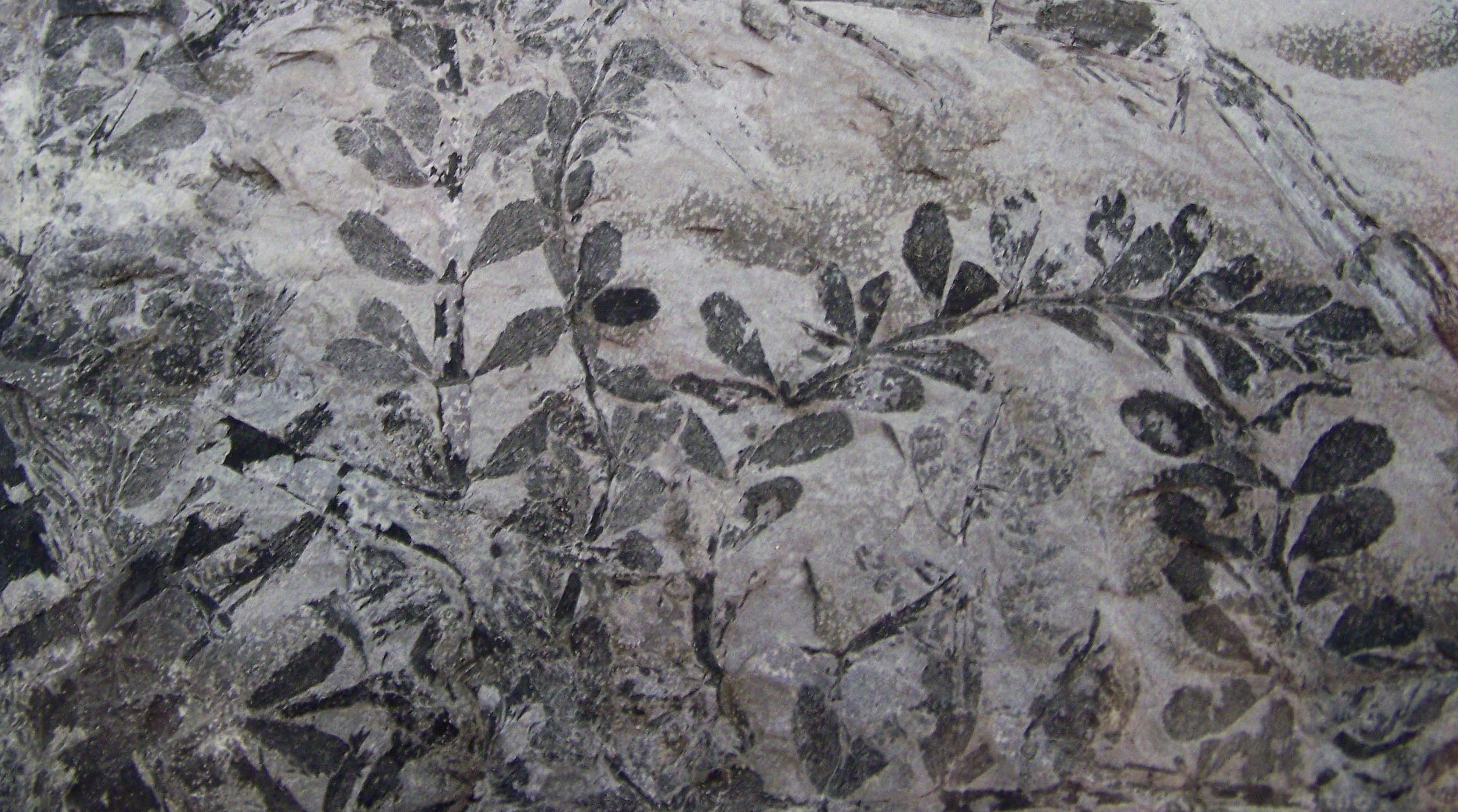
- Fossilized leaves and branches of the Devonian-Triassic horsetail relative Sphenophyllum
  †Sphenophyllum
  - †Sphenophyllum emarginatum
  - †Sphenophyllum gilmorei
  - †Sphenophyllum latifolium – or unidentified comparable form
  - †Sphenophyllum stoukenbergi – tentative report
- †Sphenopteris
- †Spirifer
  - †Spirifer grimesi
  - †Spirifer opimus
- Spirorbis
- †Streptognathodus
- †Stroboceras
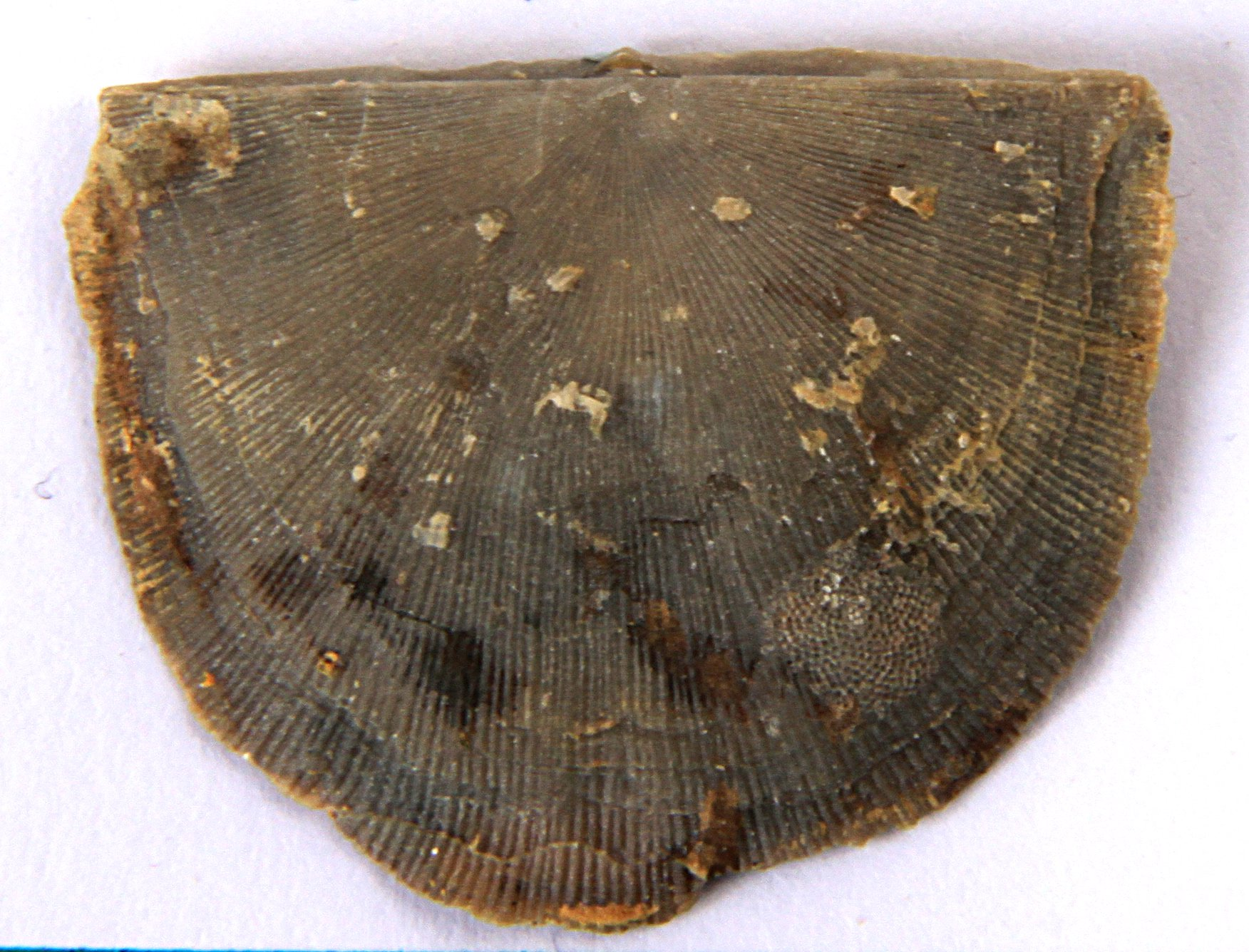
- Fossilized shell of the Ordovician-Silurian brachiopod Strophomena
  †Strophomena
  - †Strophomena costellata
  - †Strophomena neglecta
  - †Strophomena perconcava – or unidentified comparable form
  - †Strophomena planumbona
- †Tainoceras
- †Tarphyceras
- †Tentaculites
- †Tersomius
  - †Tersomius texensis – or unidentified comparable form
- †Tetrataxis
- Textularia
- †Thoracoceras
- †Thrausmosaurus – type locality for genus
- †Trimerorhachis
  - †Trimerorhachis insignis
- †Urasterella
- †Varanodon – type locality for genus
  - †Varanodon agilis – type locality for species
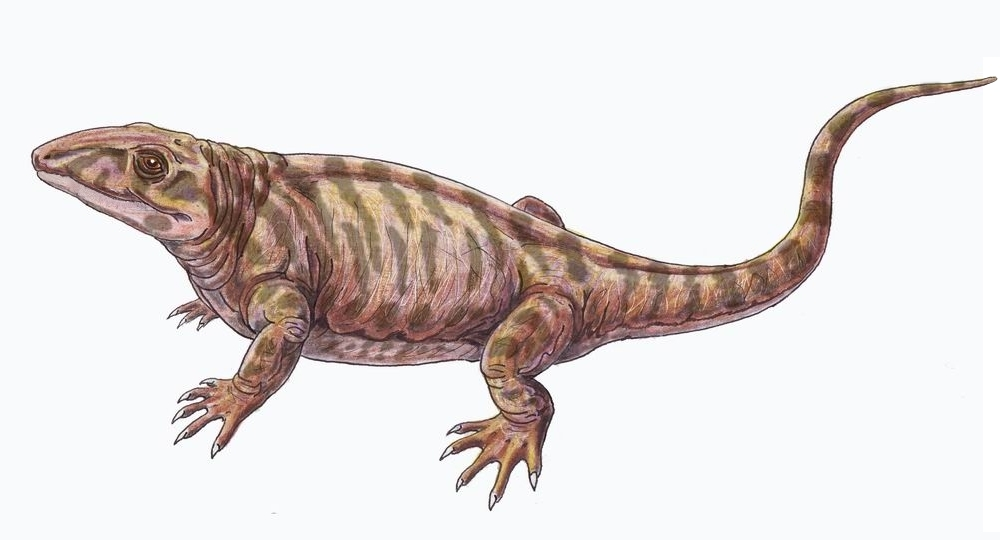
- Life restoration of the Permian synapsid (mammal precursor) Varanops
  †Varanops
  - †Varanops brevirostris – or unidentified comparable form
- †Vinella
- †Walchia
- †Watongia – type locality for genus
  - †Watongia meieri – type locality for species
- †Wilkingia
- †Worthenia
- †Wurmiella
  - †Wurmiella excavata
- †Xenacanthus
- Yoldia
- †Zatrachys

== Mesozoic ==
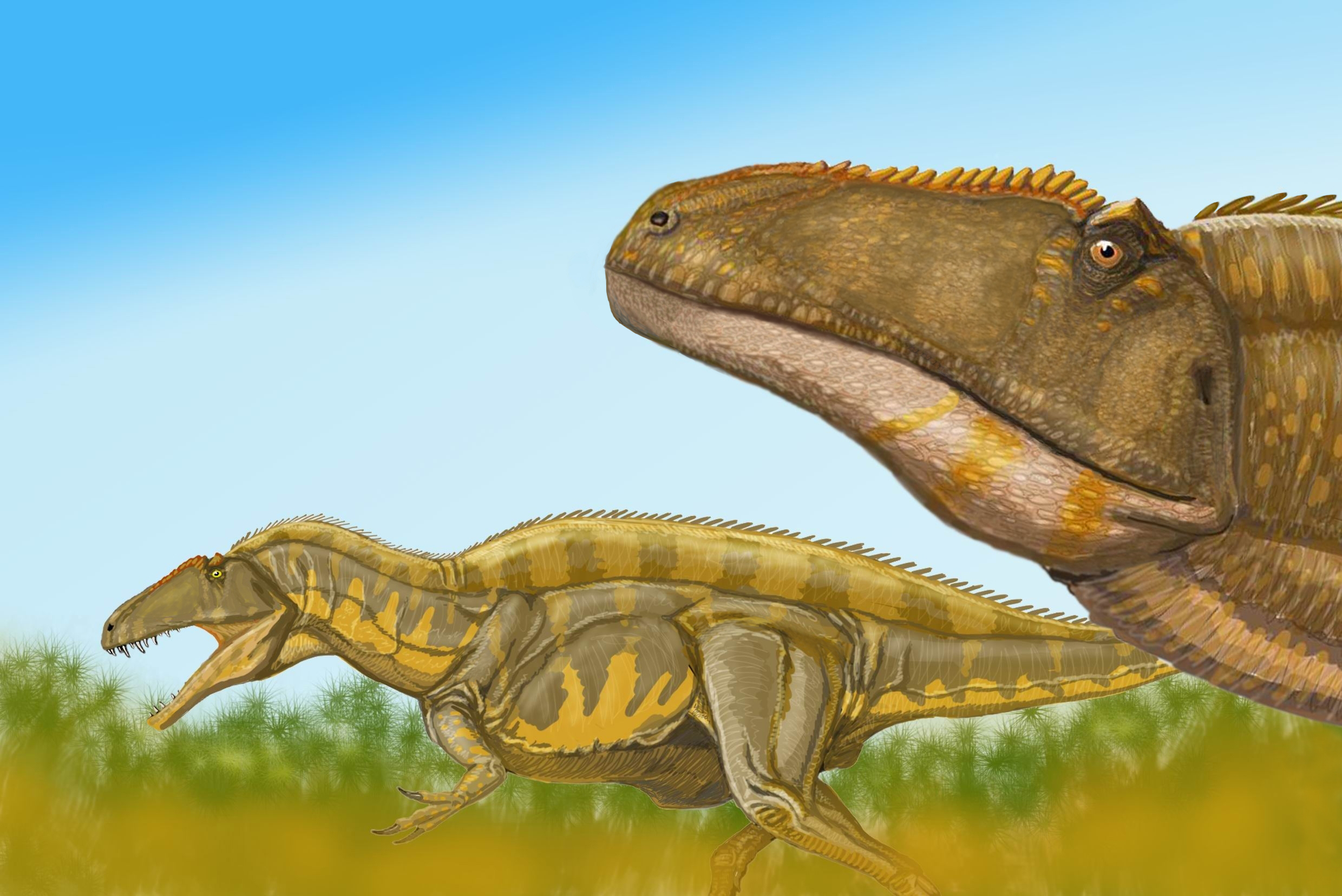
- Life restoration of the Early Cretaceous theropod dinosaur Acrocanthosaurus
  †Acrocanthosaurus – type locality for genus
  - †Acrocanthosaurus atokensis – type locality for species
- †Albanerpeton
  - †Albanerpeton arthridion
- †Allosaurus – type locality for genus
  - †Allosaurus fragilis – type locality for species
- Ammobaculites
  - †Ammobaculites subgoodlandensis – type locality for species
- †Apatosaurus
- †Arcellites
  - †Arcellites hexapartitus – or unidentified comparable form
- †Astroconodon
  - †Astroconodon denisoni – or unidentified comparable form
- †Astrodon
- †Atokasaurus – type locality for genus
  - †Atokasaurus metarsiodon – type locality for species
- †Atokatheridium – type locality for genus
  - †Atokatheridium boreni – type locality for species
- †Barosaurus
- †Bernissartia
- †Brachiosaurus
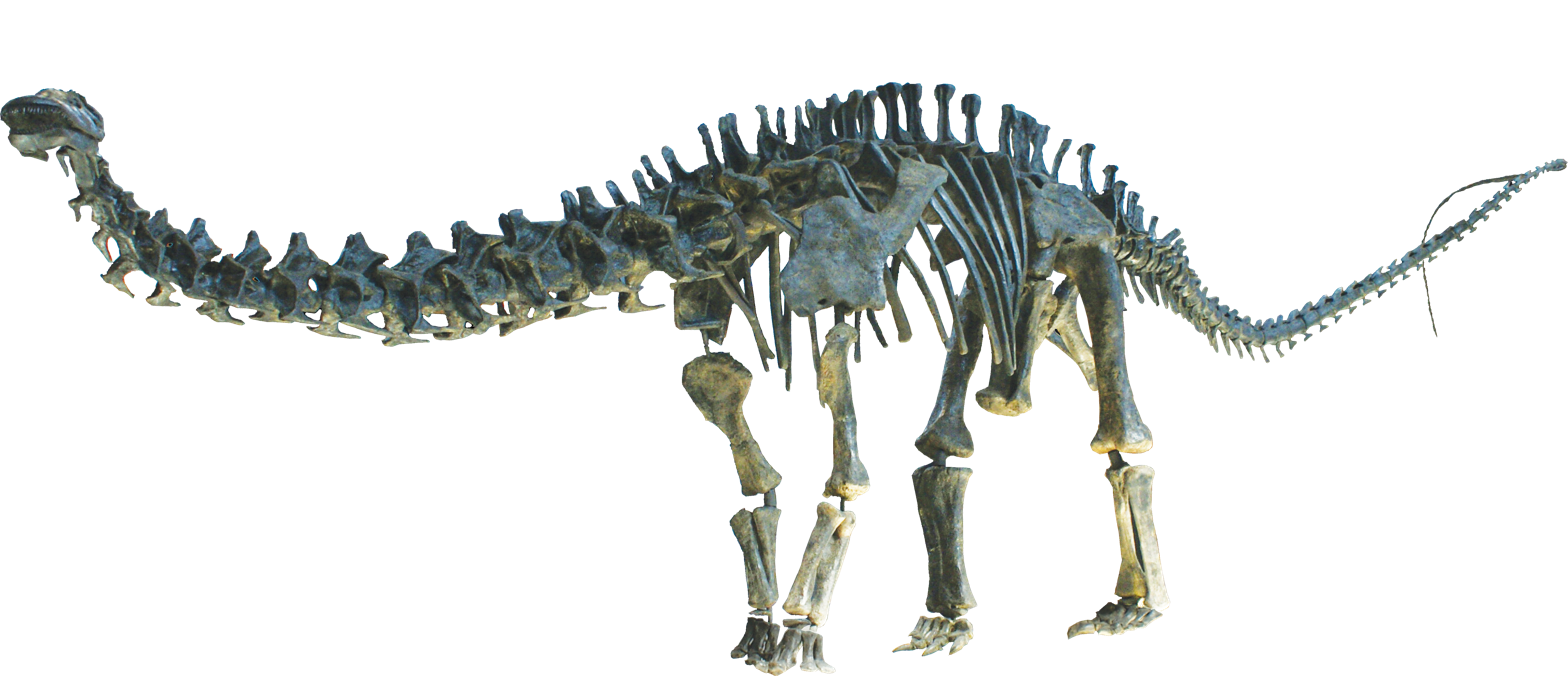
- Mounted fossilized skeleton of the Late Jurassic long-necked dinosaur Brontosaurus
  †Brontosaurus
  - †Brontosaurus parvus
- †Camarasaurus
- †Camptosaurus
  - †Camptosaurus dispar
- †Caririchnium
  - †Caririchnium leonaridii
- †Ceratodus
- †Ceratosaurus – tentative report
- Cythere
  - †Cythere concentrica
- †Cythereis
  - †Cythereis carpenterae
  - †Cythereis mahonae
  - †Cythereis subgoodlandensis – type locality for species
- Cytherella
  - †Cytherella ovata
- Cytherelloidea
  - †Cytherelloidea rhomboidalis – type locality for species
  - †Cytherelloidea subgoodlandensis – type locality for species
- Cytheridea
  - †Cytheridea amygdaloides
  - †Cytheridea oliverensis
  - †Cytheridea rotundus – or unidentified comparable form
- Cytheropteron
  - †Cytheropteron howelli
  - †Cytheropteron trinitiensis
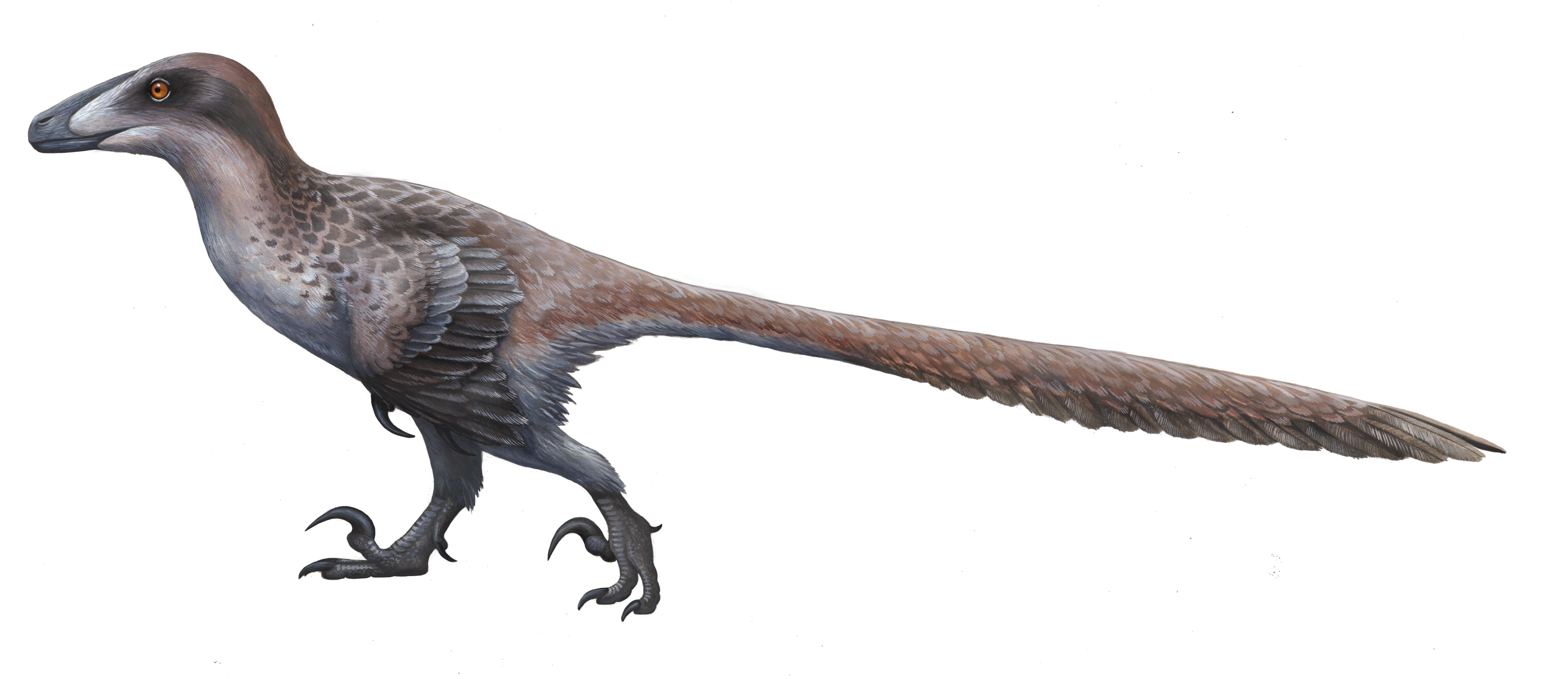
- Life restoration of the Early Cretaceous dromaeosaur ("raptor") Deinonychus
  †Deinonychus
  - †Deinonychus antirrhopus
- †Diplodocus
- †Escharoides – tentative report
  - †Escharoides nomas – type locality for species
- †Exogyra
  - †Exogyra ponderosa
  - †Exogyra texana
- †Glyptops
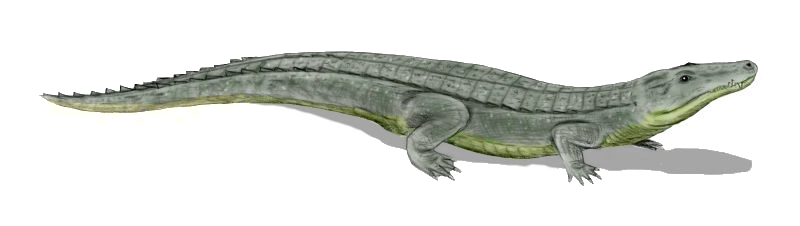
- Restoration of the Late Jurassic-Early Cretaceous crocodile relative Goniopholis
  †Goniopholis
  - †Goniopholis stovalli – type locality for species
- †Grallator
- †Gyronchus
  - †Gyronchus dumblei
- †Holoclemensia
  - †Holoclemensia texana
- †Hybodus
  - †Hybodus butleri
- †Kermackia
  - †Kermackia texana
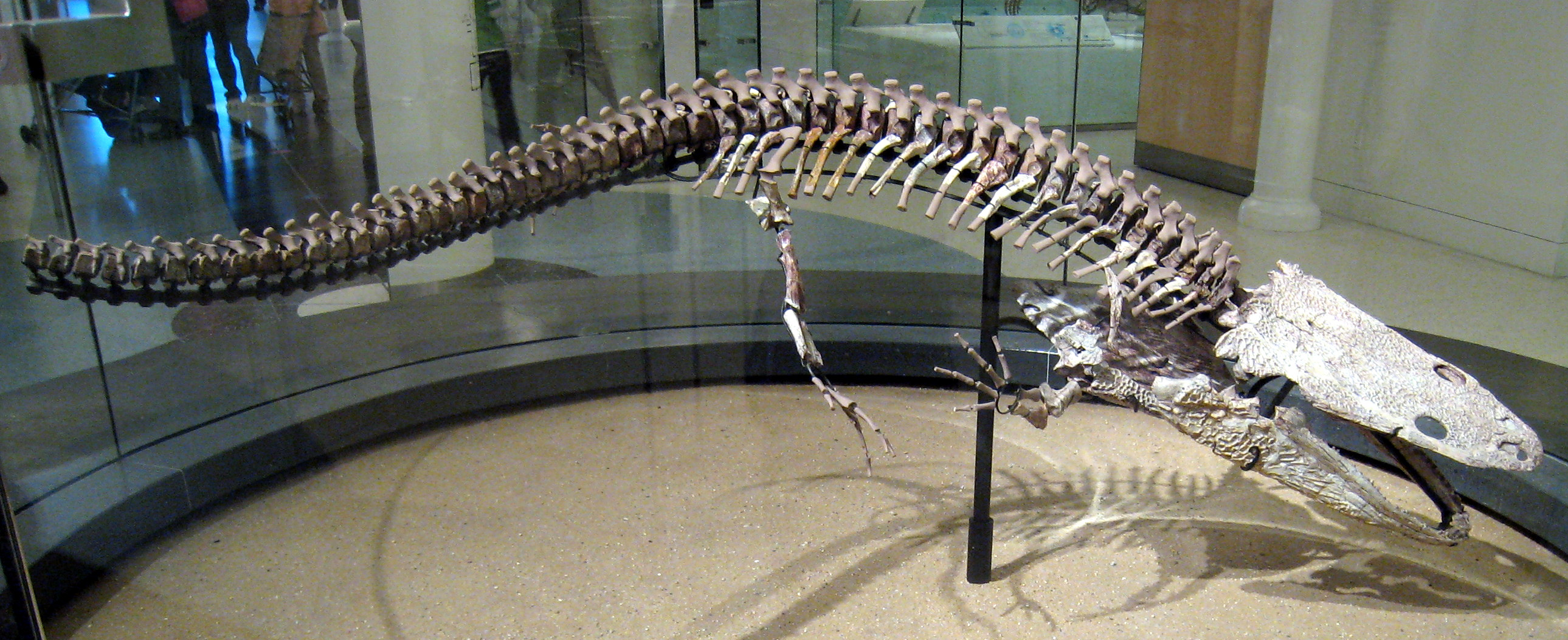
- Fossilized skeleton of the Late Triassic amphibian Koskinonodon
  †Koskinonodon
- Lituotuba
- †Lonchidion
  - †Lonchidion anitae
- †Magnoavipes
- †Megalosauripus
- †Naomichelys
- †Oklatheridium – type locality for genus
  - †Oklatheridium minax – type locality for species
  - †Oklatheridium szalayi – type locality for species
- Ostrea
  - †Ostrea crenulimargo
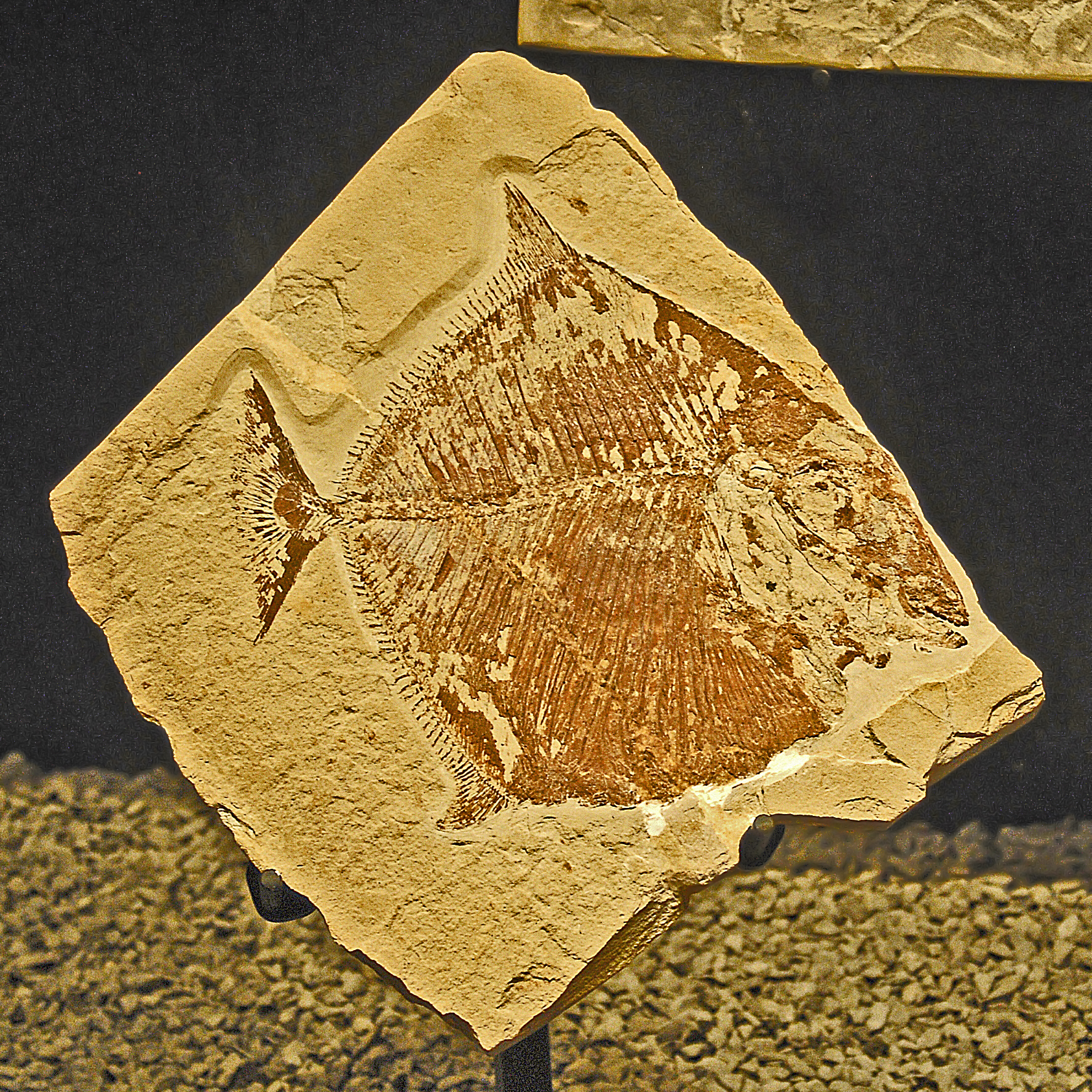
- Fossilized skeleton of the Early Cretaceous-Eocene bony fish Palaeobalistum
  †Palaeobalistum – tentative report
- †Pappotherium
  - †Pappotherium pattersoni
- †Paracimexomys – tentative report
  - †Paracimexomys crossi – type locality for species
- Paracypris
  - †Paracypris siliqua
- Patellina
  - †Patellina subcretacea
- Planulina
- †Pleurocoelus
- †Pteraichnus
- †Ptilotodon – type locality for genus
  - †Ptilotodon wilsoni – type locality for species
- Pyripora
- Ramphonotus
  - †Ramphonotus pedunculatus
- Ramulina
- Reophax
  - †Reophax subgoodlandensis – type locality for species
- †Saurophaganax – type locality for genus
  - †Saurophaganax maximus – type locality for species
- †Sauroposeidon – type locality for genus
  - †Sauroposeidon proteles – type locality for species
- †Stegosaurus
- †Tenontosaurus
- Textularia
  - †Textularia conica
- Vaginulina
  - †Vaginulina intumescens

== Cenozoic ==
- †Adelphailurus
- †Aelurodon
  - †Aelurodon taxoides – or unidentified comparable form
- †Aepycamelus
  - †Aepycamelus robustus
- †Agriotherium
  - †Agriotherium schneideri
- †Alforjas
  - †Alforjas taylori
- Alligator
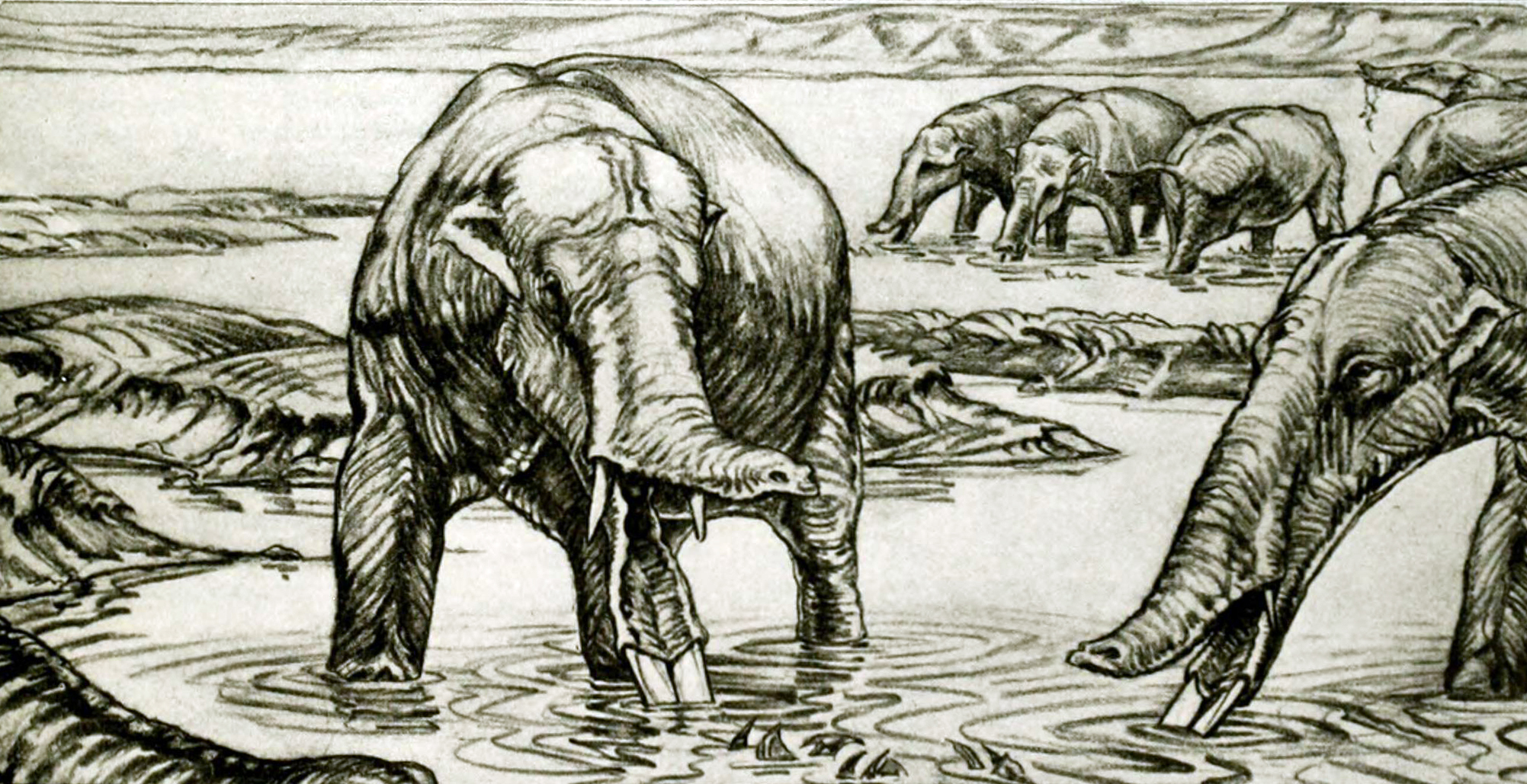
- Life restoration of the Miocene elephant relative Amebelodon. Margret Flinsch (1932).
  †Amebelodon
- †Amphimachairodus
  - †Amphimachairodus coloradensis
- †Aphelops
  - †Aphelops malacorhinus
- †Arctonasua
  - †Arctonasua fricki – type locality for species
- †Astrohippus
  - †Astrohippus ansae
- †Barbourofelis
  - †Barbourofelis loveorum
- Bison
  - †Bison antiquus
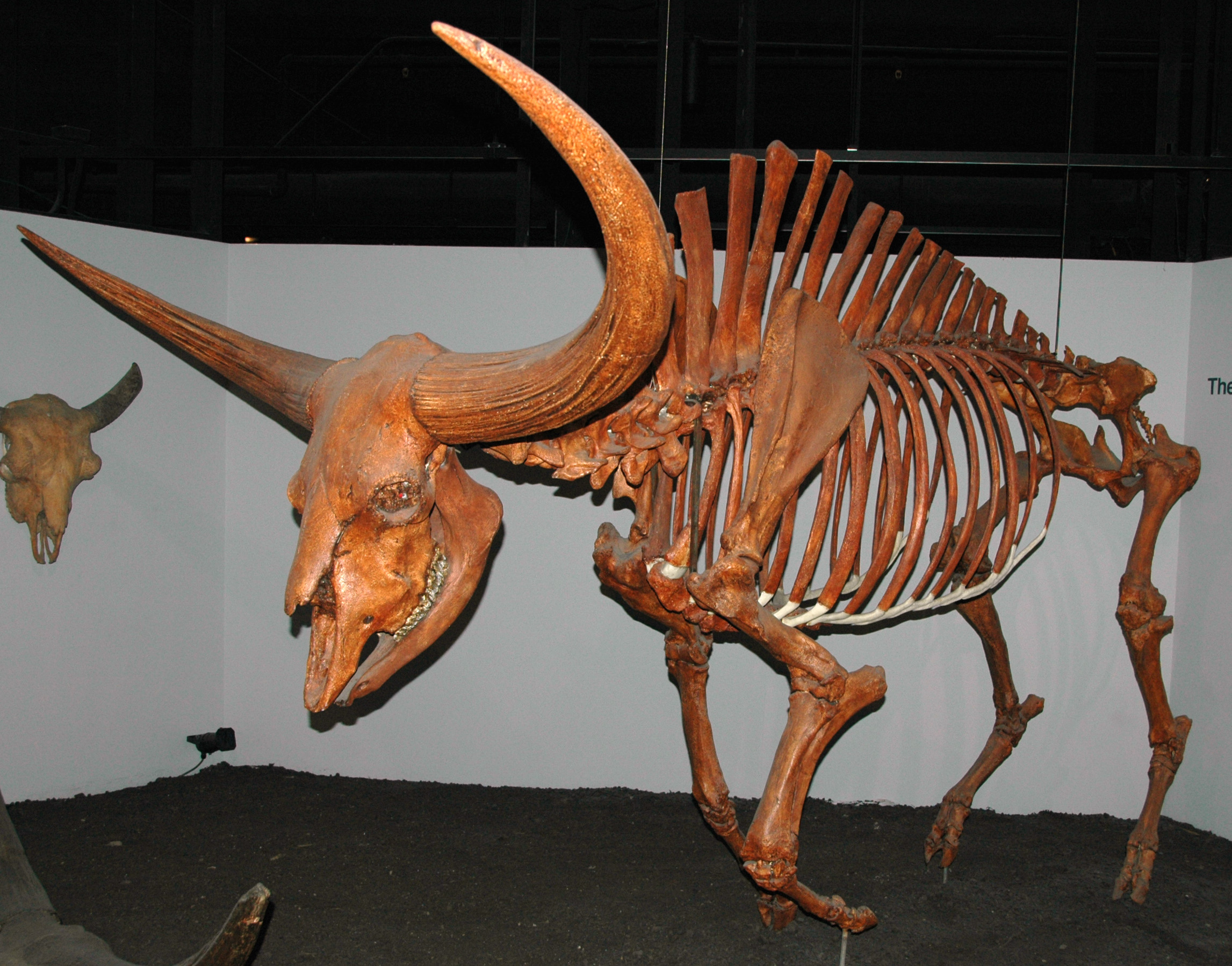
  - Mounted fossilized skeleton of the Pleistocene Bison latifrons, or long-horned bison
    †Bison latifrons – or unidentified comparable form
- Blarina
  - †Blarina brevicauda
- †Bootherium
  - †Bootherium bombifrons
- †Borophagus
  - †Borophagus secundus
- †Buisnictis
  - †Buisnictis schoffi – type locality for species
- †Calippus
  - †Calippus martini – type locality for species
  - †Calippus regulus
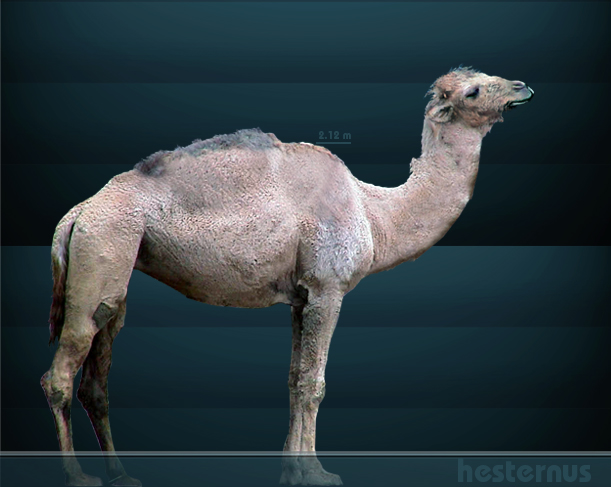
- Life restoration of the Pliocene-Holocene camel Camelops
  †Camelops
- Canis
  - †Canis ferox
  - †Canis latrans
- †Carpocyon
  - †Carpocyon limosus
- †Castoroides
  - †Castoroides ohioensis – or unidentified comparable form
- Chaetodipus
  - †Chaetodipus hispidus – or unidentified comparable form
- Coluber
  - †Coluber constrictor
- †Copemys
  - †Copemys mariae – type locality for species
  - †Copemys shotwelli
- †Cormohipparion
  - †Cormohipparion occidentale
- Crotalus
  - †Crotalus viridis – or unidentified comparable form
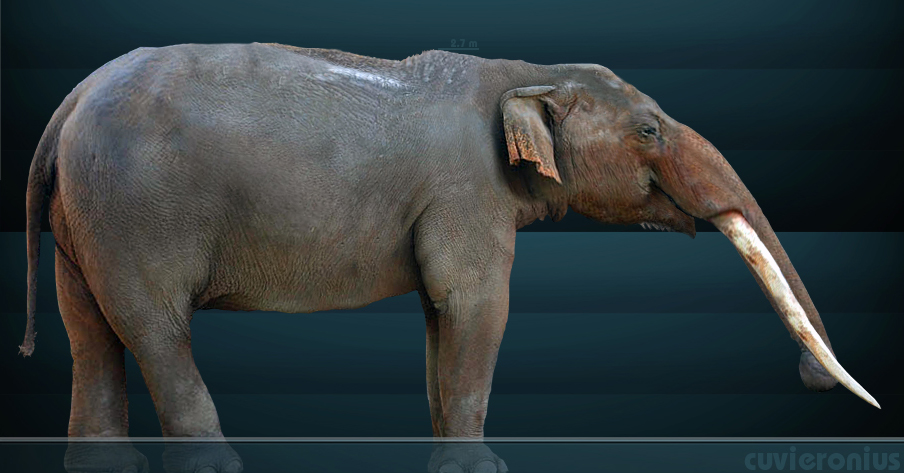
- Life restoration of the Pliocene-Holocene elephant relative Cuvieronius
  †Cuvieronius
  - †Cuvieronius priestleyi
- Cynomys
  - †Cynomys ludovicianus
- Dasypus
  - †Dasypus bellus
- †Desmathyus
  - †Desmathyus brachydontus
- †Dinohippus
  - †Dinohippus leidyanus
- †Dipoides
  - †Dipoides stovalli
- †Domninoides
  - †Domninoides hessei – type locality for species
  - †Domninoides knoxjonesi – type locality for species
- Elaphe
  - †Elaphe buisi – type locality for species
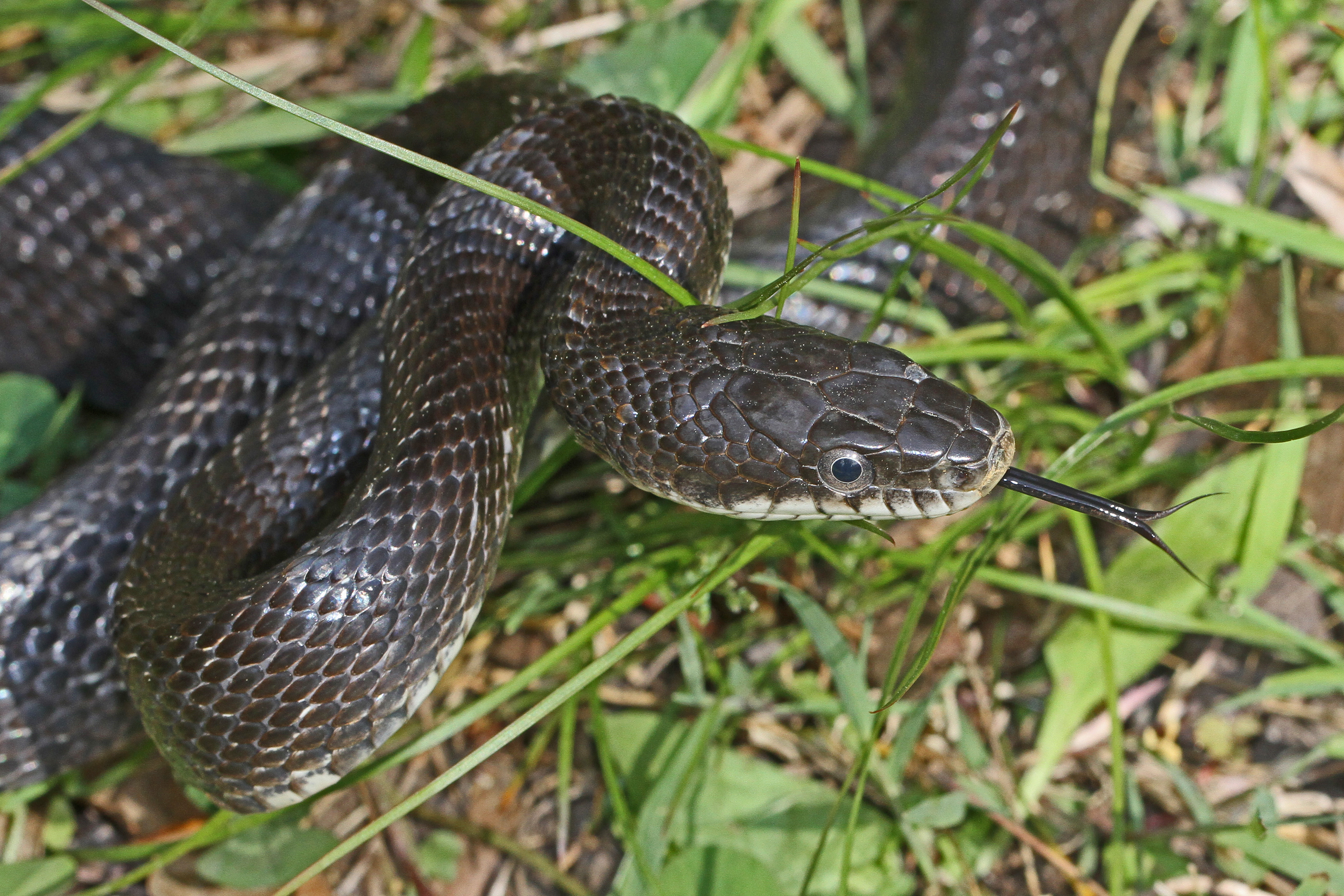
  - A living Pantherophis obsoletus, or black rat snake
    †Elaphe obsoleta – or unidentified comparable form
  - †Elaphe vulpina
- †Epicyon
  - †Epicyon haydeni
  - †Epicyon saevus
- Equus
  - †Equus excelsus
  - †Equus francisci
  - †Equus giganteus
  - †Equus niobrarensis
  - †Equus scotti
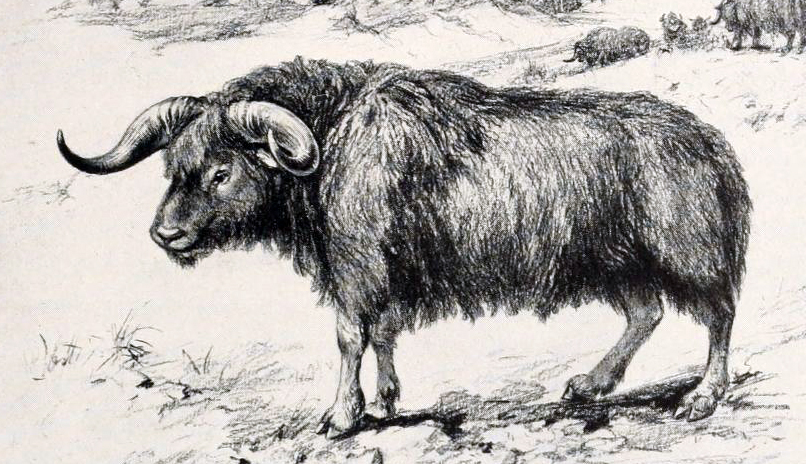
- Life restoration of the Pleistocene bovid Euceratherium, or the shrub ox. Robert Bruce Horsfall (1913).
  †Euceratherium
  - †Euceratherium collinum – type locality for species
- †Eucyon
  - †Eucyon davisi
- Felis
  - †Felis rexroadensis
- Geochelone
- Geomys
  - †Geomys bursarius
- †Gigantocamelus
  - †Gigantocamelus spatulus
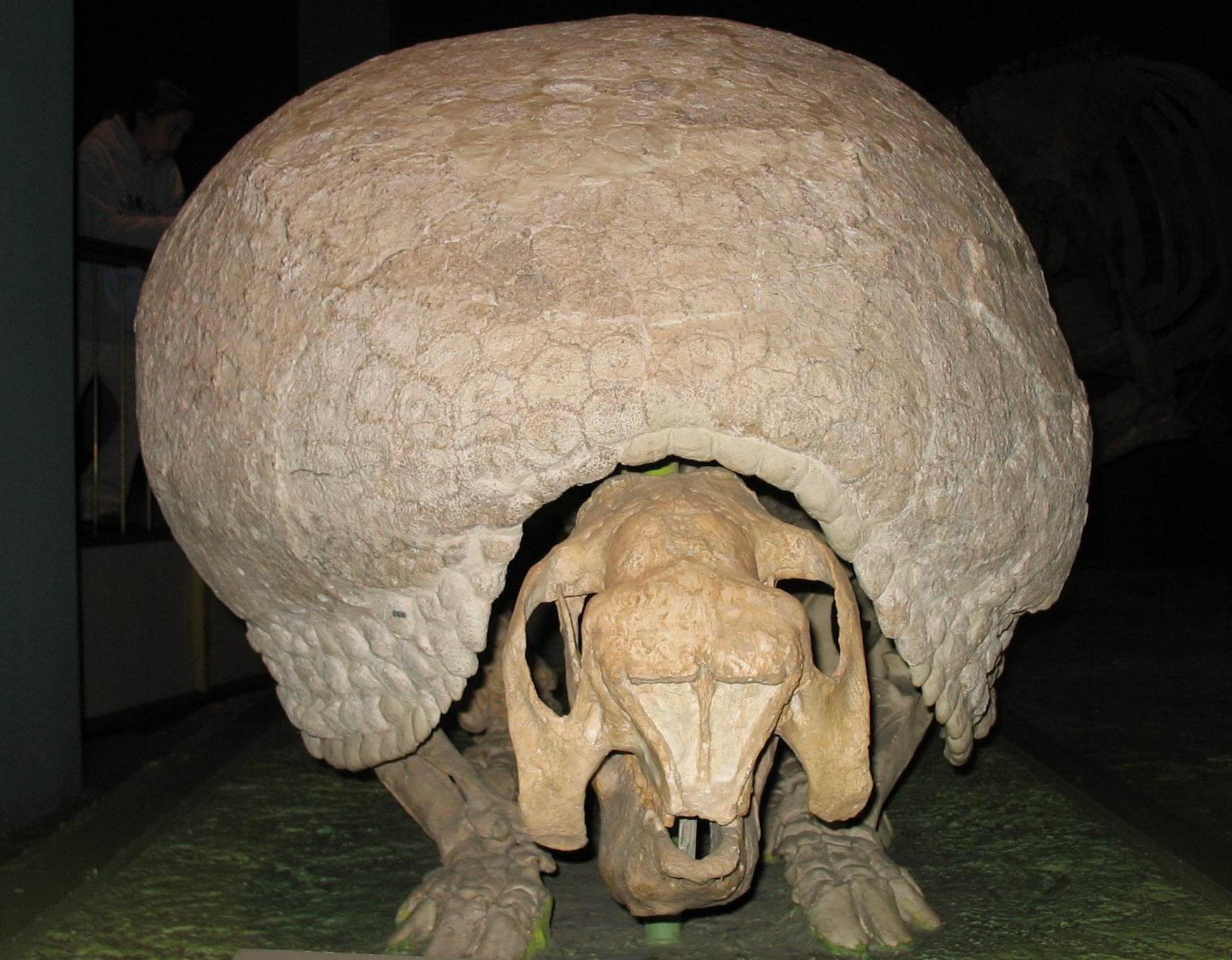
- Mounted fossilized skeleton of the Pleistocene armadillo relative Glyptotherium
  †Glyptotherium
  - †Glyptotherium arizonae
- †Gomphotherium
  - †Gomphotherium obscurum
- Gopherus
- †Hemiauchenia
  - †Hemiauchenia macrocephala
- †Hesperoscalops
- †Hesperotestudo
  - †Hesperotestudo riggsi
- Heterodon
  - †Heterodon nasicus
  - †Heterodon platyrhinos
  - †Heterodon plionasicus
- †Hipparion
  - †Hipparion tehonense
- †Hippotherium
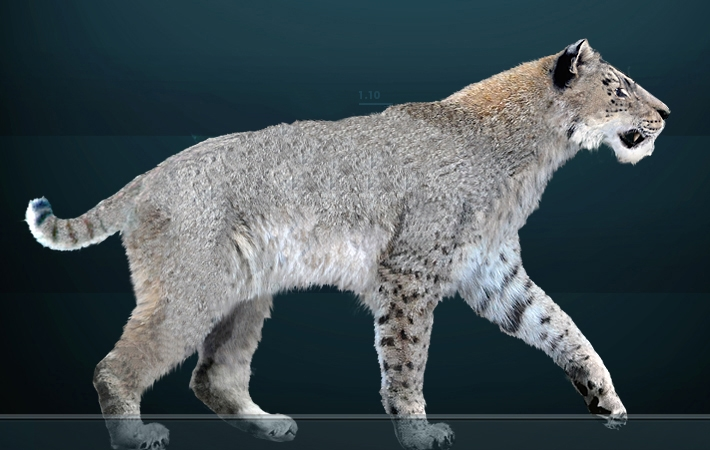
- Restoration of Pliocene-Pleistocene Homotherium, or scimitar cat
  †Homotherium – type locality for genus
  - †Homotherium serum – type locality for species
- †Hypolagus
  - †Hypolagus vetus
- Lampropeltis
  - †Lampropeltis doliata
  - †Lampropeltis getulus
  - †Lampropeltis triangulum
- Lasionycteris
  - †Lasionycteris noctivagans
- †Leptodontomys
- Lepus
- Lophodytes
  - †Lophodytes cucullatus
- Lynx
  - †Lynx proterolyncis
- †Macrognathomys
  - †Macrognathomys gemmacolis
- †Mammut
- †Mammuthus
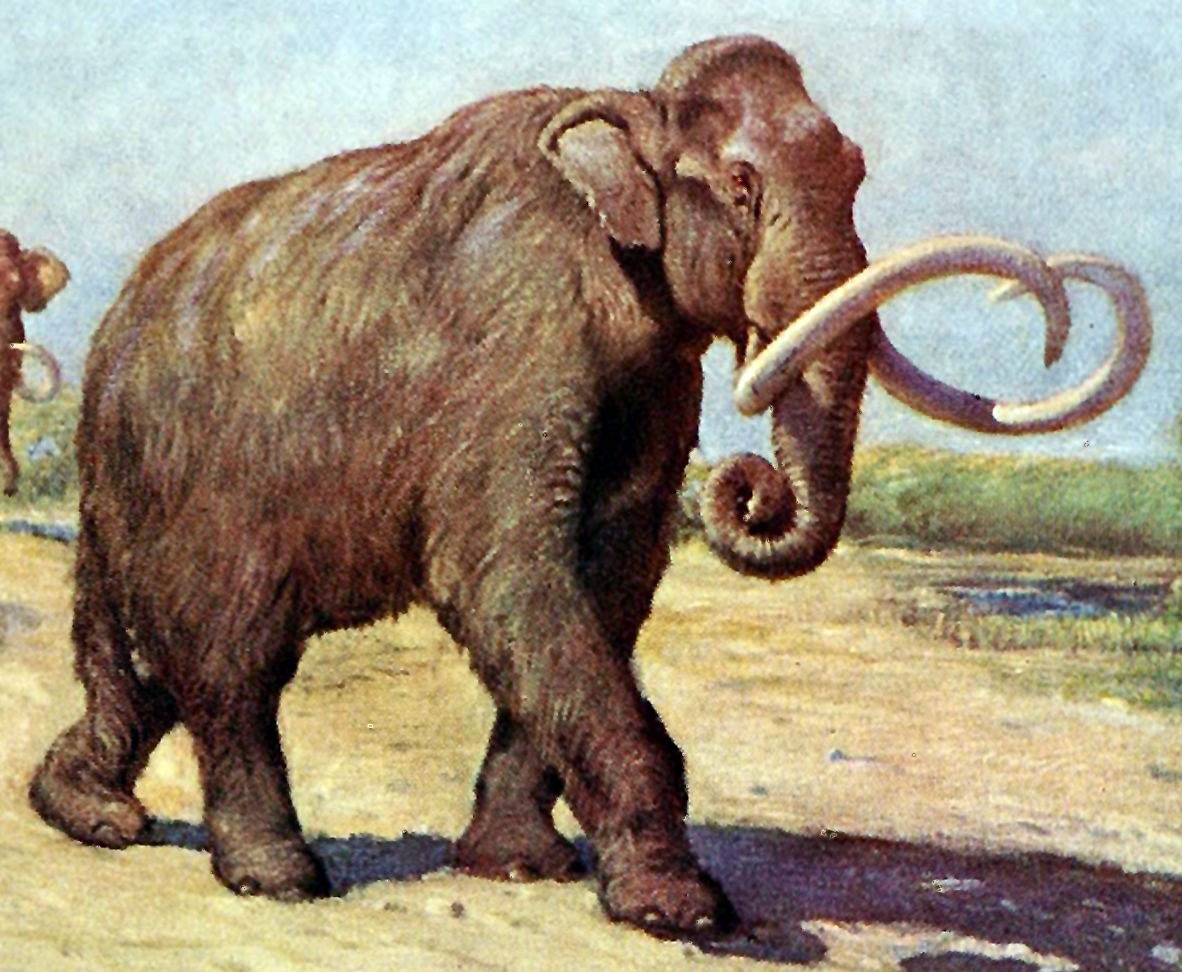
  - Life restoration of a herd of Mammuthus columbi, or Columbian mammoths. The extent of the fur depicted is hypothetical. Charles R. Knight (1909).
    †Mammuthus columbi
  - †Mammuthus hayi
- Marmota
- †Megalonyx
  - †Megalonyx jeffersonii
- †Megatylopus
  - †Megatylopus matthewi
- †Merychippus
  - †Merychippus coloradense – or unidentified comparable form
- †Merychyus
  - †Merychyus novomexicanus
- Microtus
  - †Microtus ochrogaster – or unidentified comparable form
  - †Microtus pennsylvanicus
- †Miospermophilus
  - †Miospermophilus lavertyi – type locality for species
- †Mylohyus
  - †Mylohyus fossilis
- Myotis
  - †Myotis yumanensis – or unidentified comparable form
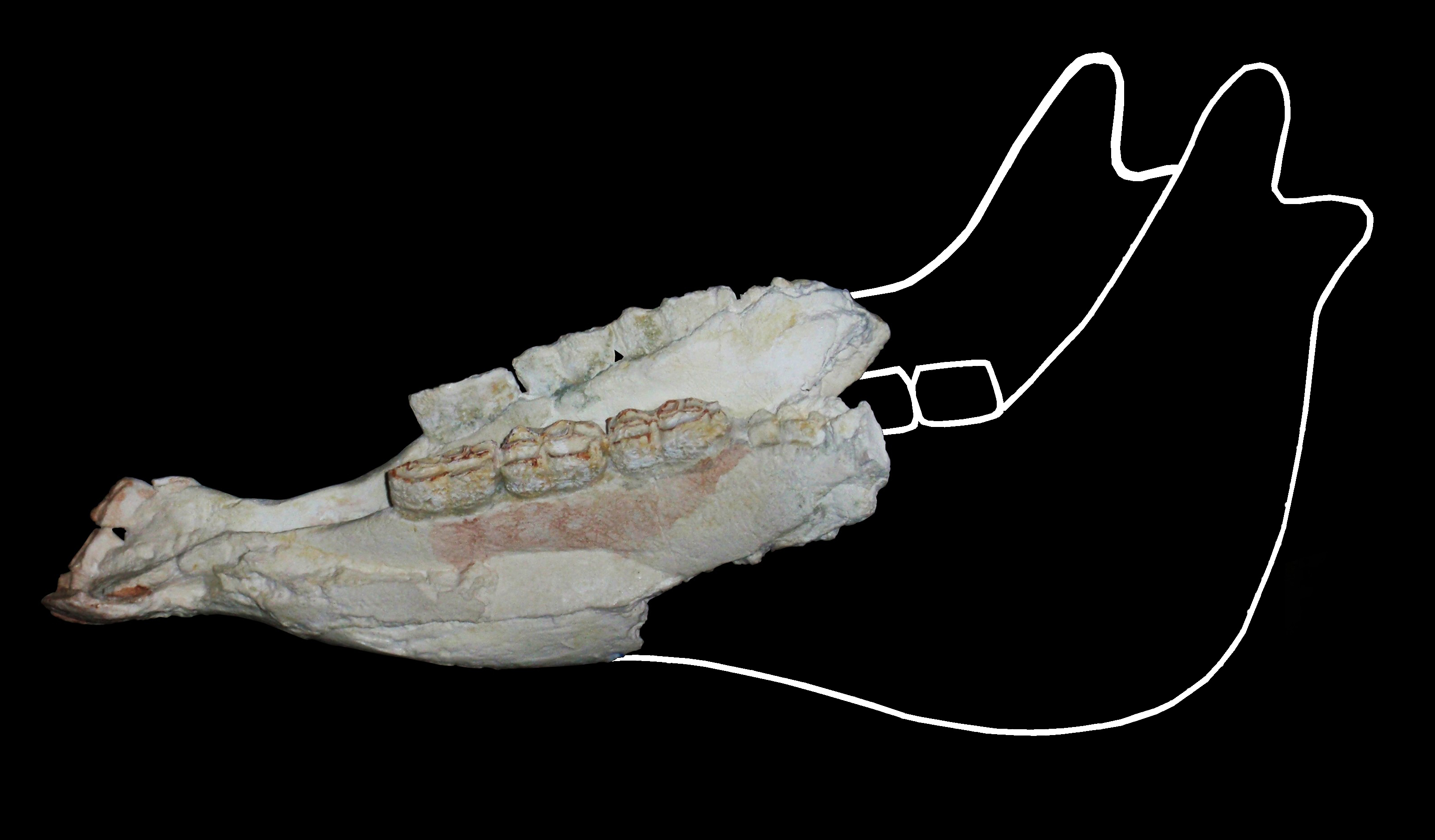
- Partial fossilized mandible of the Miocene-Pliocene horse Nannippus
  †Nannippus
  - †Nannippus aztecus
  - †Nannippus lenticularis
- †Neohipparion
  - †Neohipparion eurystyle
  - †Neohipparion gidleyi
  - †Neohipparion leptode
- Neotoma
- Nerodia
- †Nimravides
  - †Nimravides thinobates – or unidentified comparable form
- †Nothodipoides
  - †Nothodipoides planus – type locality for species
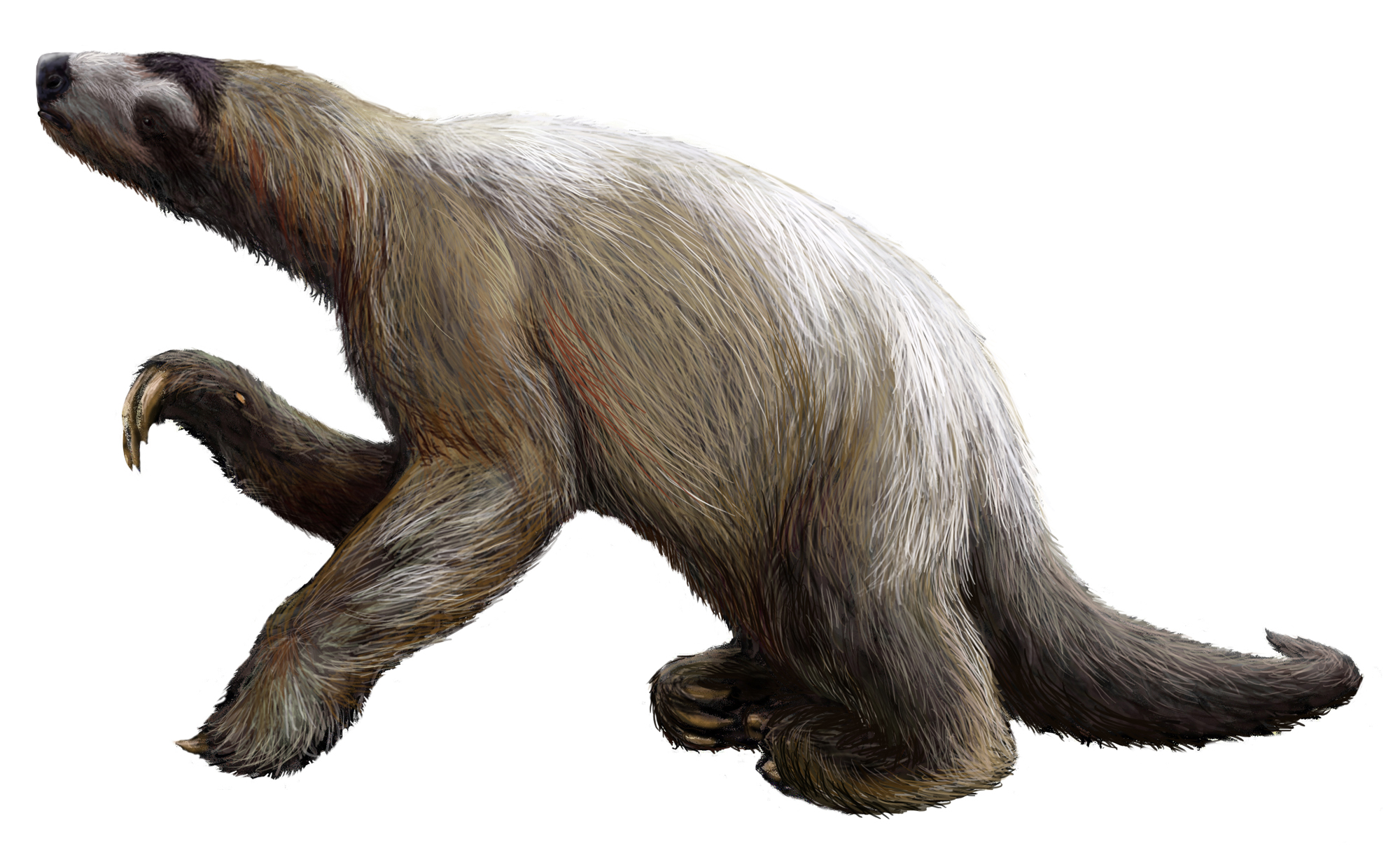
- Life restoration of the Pleistocene ground sloth Nothrotheriops
  †Nothrotheriops
  - †Nothrotheriops texanus
- Odocoileus
- †Oklahomalagus
  - †Oklahomalagus whisenhunti – type locality for species
- Ondatra
  - †Ondatra zibethicus
- Onychomys
  - †Onychomys leucogaster – or unidentified comparable form
- Ophisaurus
  - †Ophisaurus attenuatus
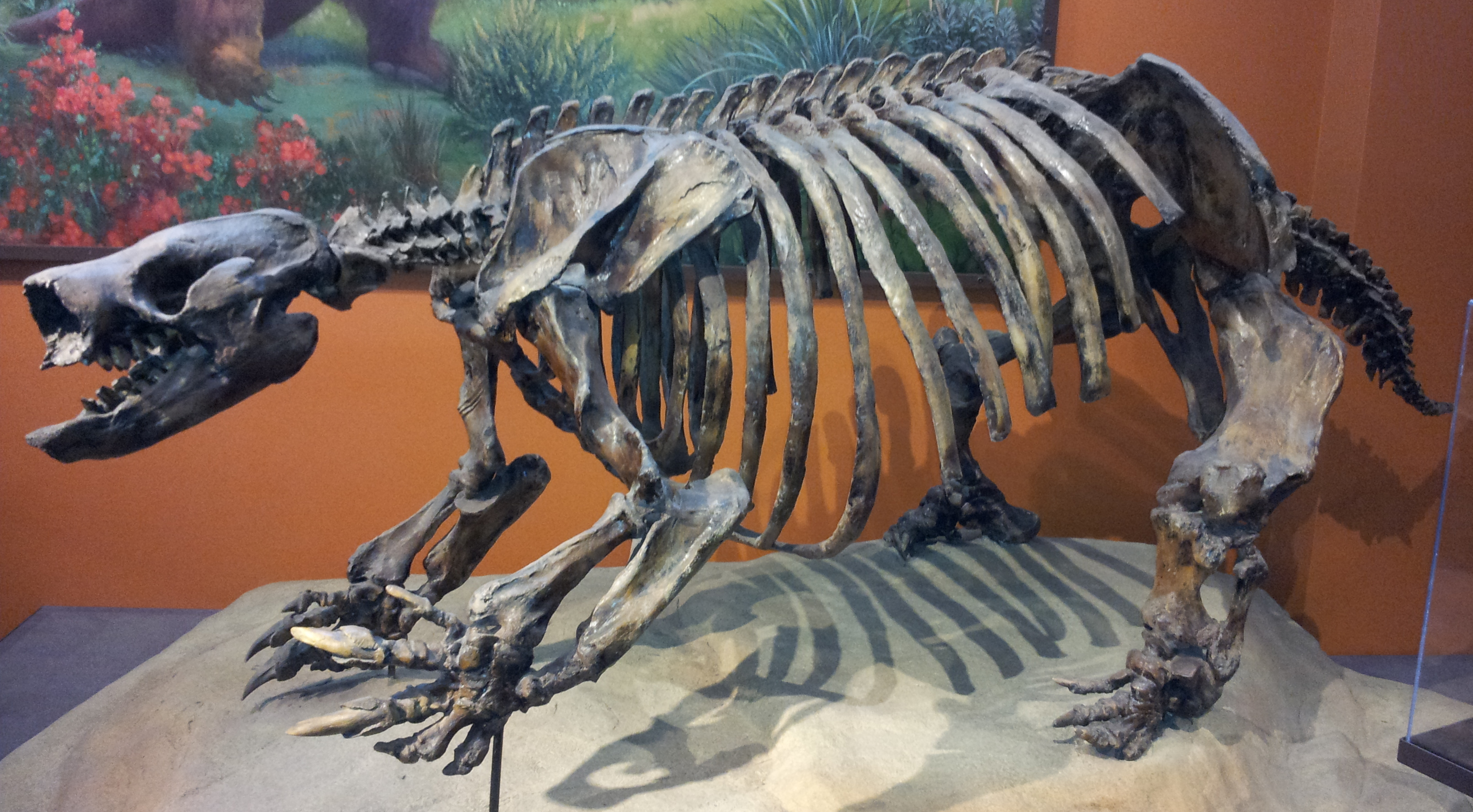
- Fossilized skeleton of the Pliocene-Pleistocene ground sloth Paramylodon
  †Paramylodon
  - †Paramylodon harlani
- †Paranasua
- †Pediomeryx
  - †Pediomeryx hemphillensis
- Perognathus
  - †Perognathus mclaughlini – or unidentified comparable form
- Peromyscus
  - †Peromyscus berendsensis – type locality for species
  - †Peromyscus cochrani – or unidentified comparable form
- Pipistrellus
  - †Pipistrellus subflavus
- Pituophis
  - †Pituophis catenifer
  - †Pituophis melanoleucus
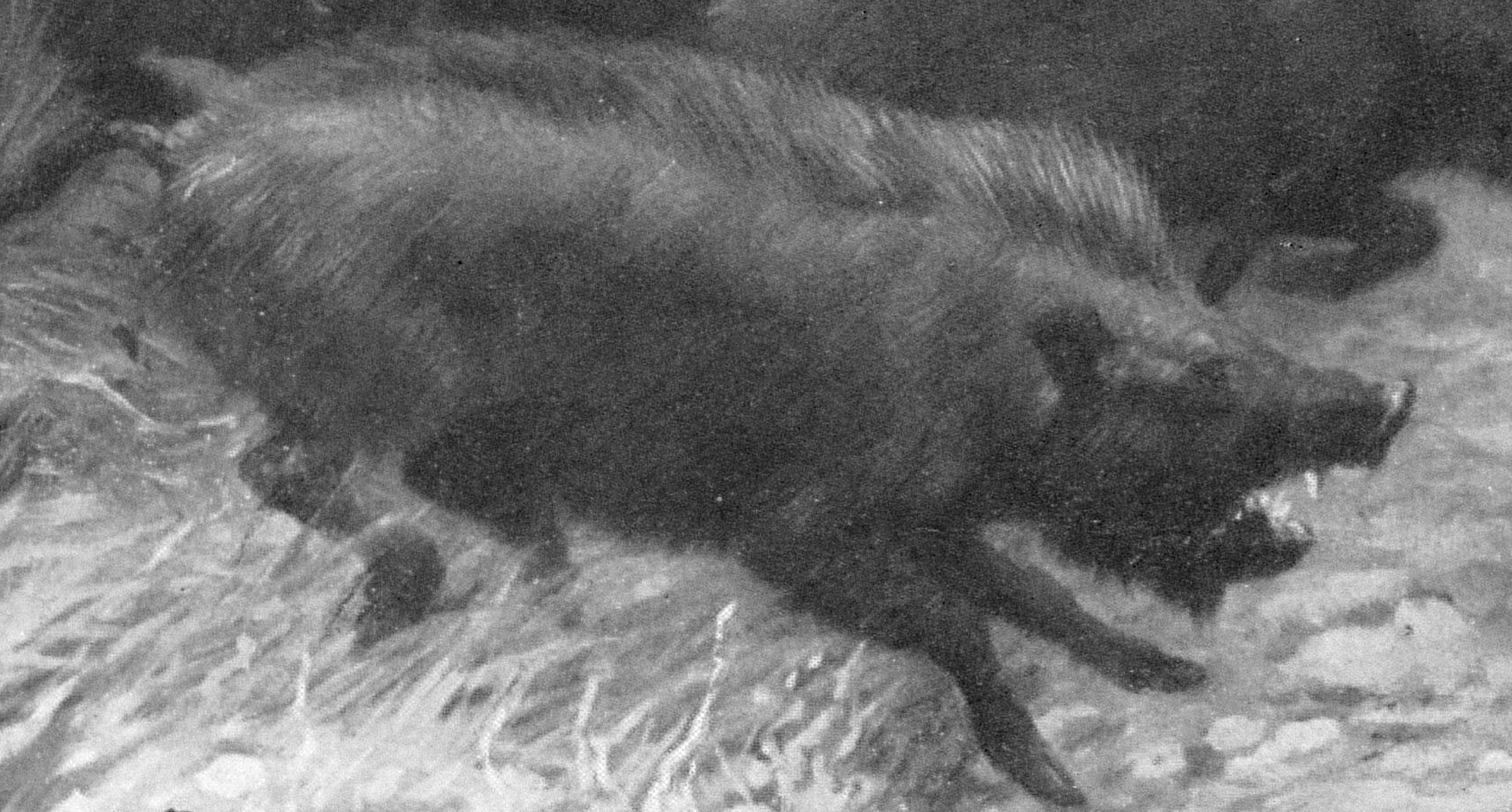
- Restoration of a herd of alarmed Miocene-Pleistocene peccaries of the genus Platygonus. Charles R. Knight (1922).
  †Platygonus
  - †Platygonus vetus – or unidentified comparable form
- †Pleiolama
  - †Pleiolama vera
- †Plesiogulo
  - †Plesiogulo marshalli
- †Pliogeomys
  - †Pliogeomys buisi – type locality for species
- †Pliohippus
  - †Pliohippus nobilis
  - †Pliohippus pernix
- †Pliotaxidea
  - †Pliotaxidea nevadensis – or unidentified comparable form
- Podomys
  - †Podomys oklahomensis
- †Procamelus
  - †Procamelus grandis – or unidentified comparable form
- †Prodipodomys
- †Pronotolagus
  - †Pronotolagus apachensis
- Pseudacris
  - †Pseudacris triseriata
- Pseudemys
  - †Pseudemys hilli – type locality for species
- †Pseudhipparion
  - †Pseudhipparion gratum
  - †Pseudhipparion simpsoni
  - †Pseudhipparion skinneri
- Reithrodontomys
- †Serbelodon – or unidentified comparable form
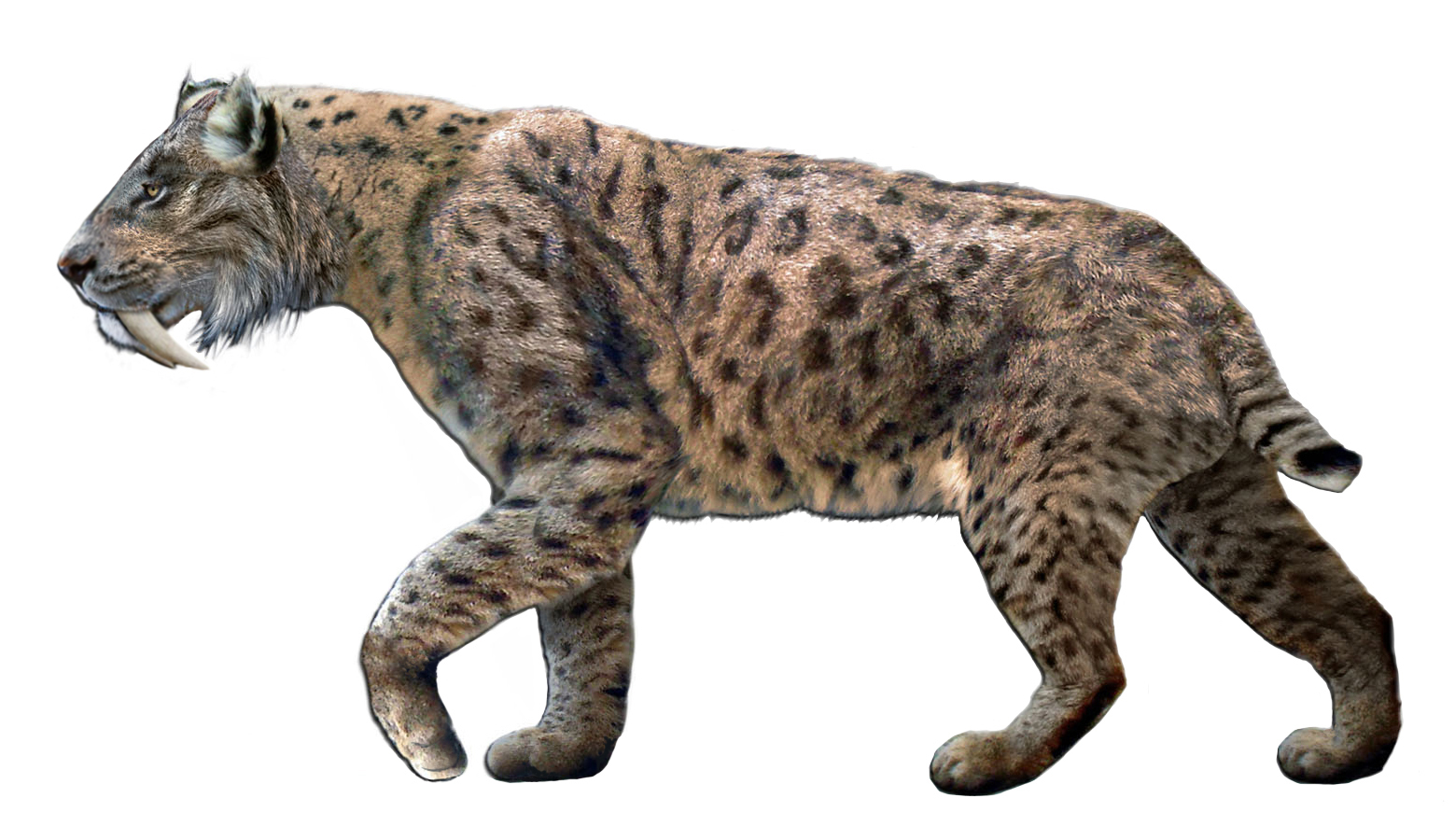
- Life restoration of the Pleistocene-Holocene saber-tooth cat Smilodon
  †Smilodon
  - †Smilodon fatalis
- Sorex
  - †Sorex arcticus
  - †Sorex cinereus
  - †Sorex palustris
- Spermophilus
  - †Spermophilus dotti
  - †Spermophilus franklinii
  - †Spermophilus rexroadensis
  - †Spermophilus richardsonii – or unidentified comparable form
  - †Spermophilus tridecemlineatus
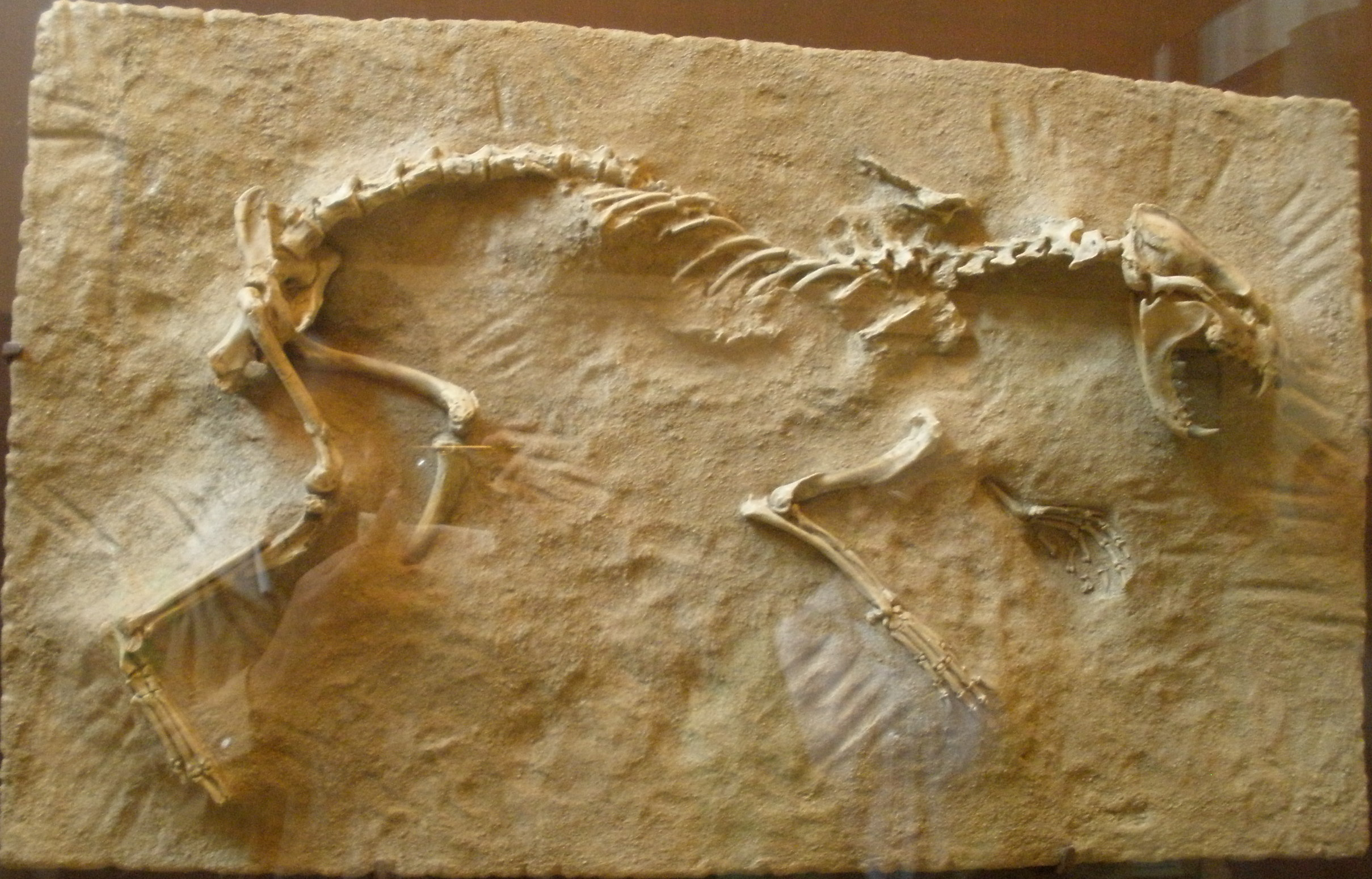
- Fossilized skeleton of the Miocene weasel Sthenictis
  Sthenictis
- Sylvilagus
- Synaptomys
  - †Synaptomys bunkeri
- Tamias
  - †Tamias striatus
- Tapirus
  - †Tapirus haysii
  - †Tapirus veroensis
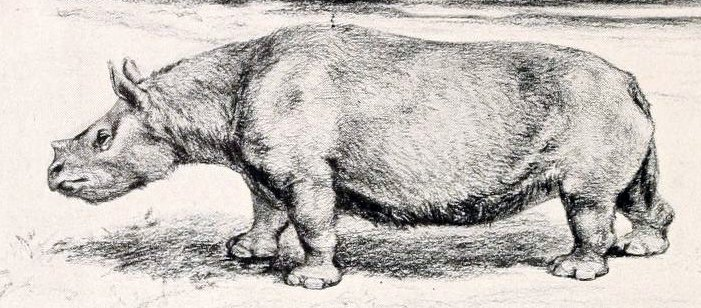
- Restoration of the Miocene-Pliocene rhinoceros Teleoceras
  †Teleoceras
  - †Teleoceras fossiger
  - †Teleoceras guymonense – type locality for species
  - †Teleoceras hicksi
- Terrapene
  - †Terrapene parornata – type locality for species
- †Texoceros
  - †Texoceros guymonensis – type locality for species
  - †Texoceros minorei – type locality for species
- Thamnophis
  - †Thamnophis radix
- Thomomys
  - †Thomomys talpoides
- †Tregosorex
  - †Tregosorex holmani
- †Untermannerix
  - †Untermannerix copiosus
- Vulpes
  - †Vulpes stenognathus – type locality for species
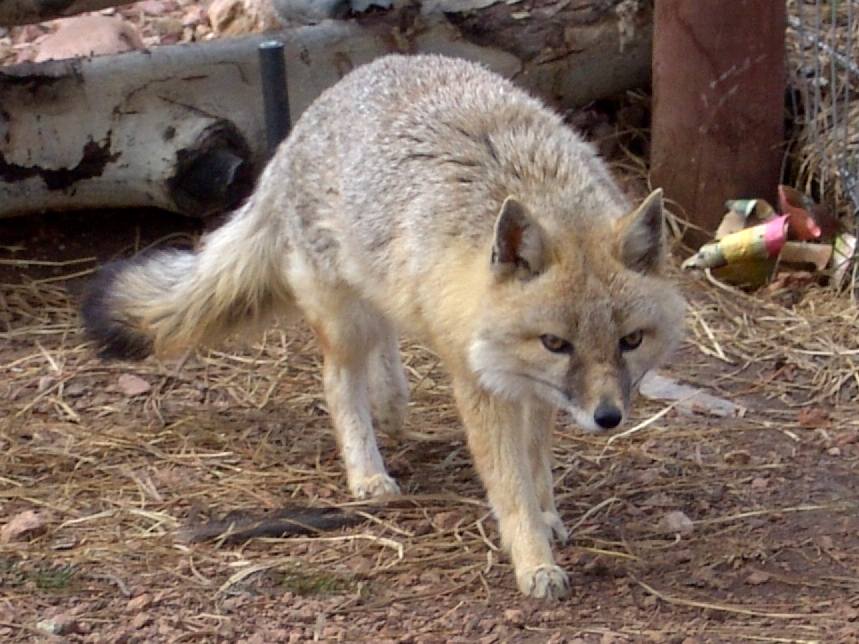
  - A living Vulpes velox, or swift fox
    †Vulpes velox
- †Yumaceras
  - †Yumaceras figginsi – or unidentified comparable form
- Zapus
