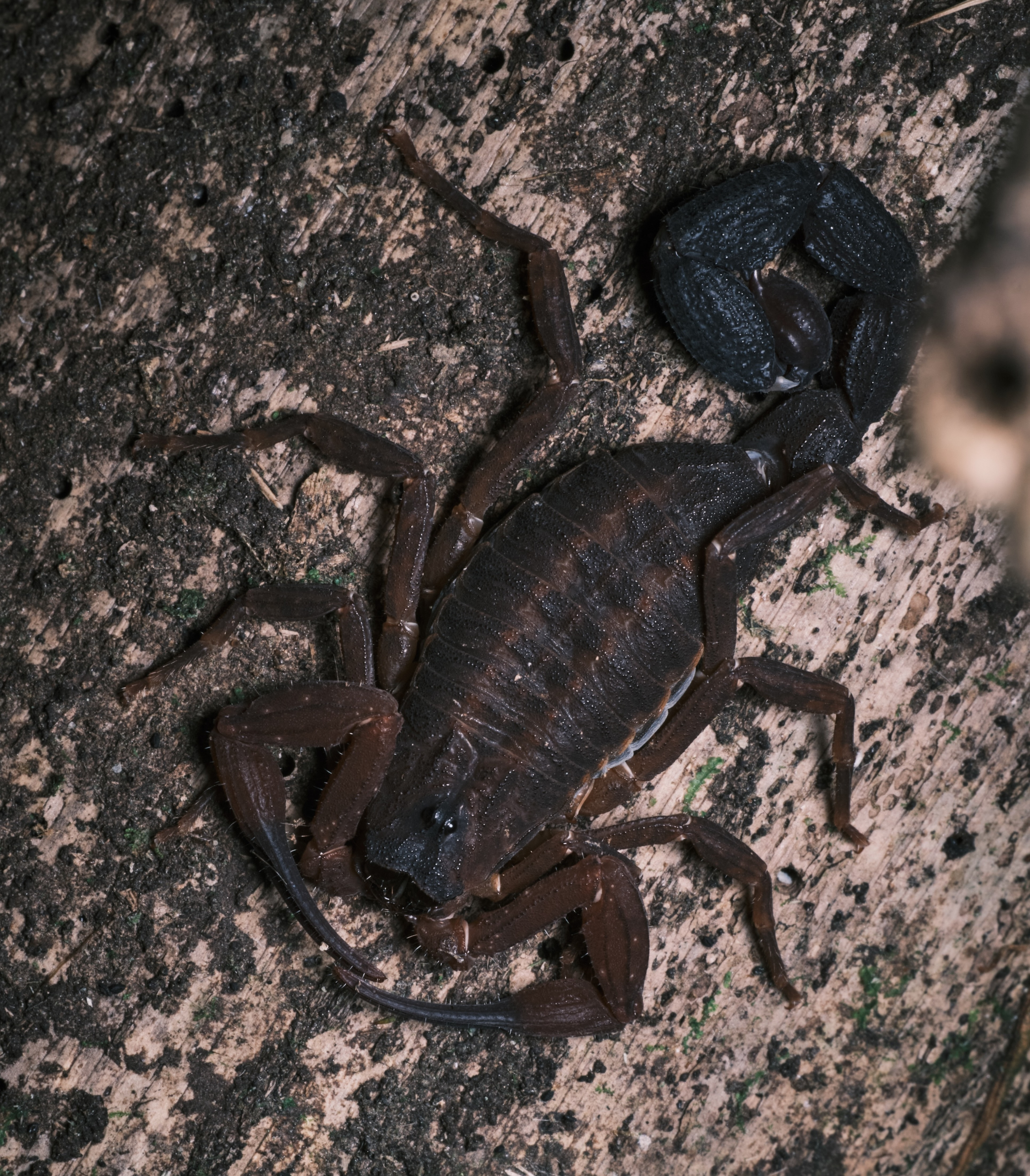
- Tityus achilles, unsexed juvenile in situ

Scientific classification
- Kingdom: Animalia
- Phylum: Arthropoda
- Subphylum: Chelicerata
- Class: Arachnida
- Order: Scorpiones
- Family: Buthidae
- Genus: Tityus
- Species: T. achilles

Binomial name
- Tityus achilles Laborieux, 2024

= Tityus achilles =

Species of scorpion

Tityus achilles, commonly known as Achilles’ scorpion, is a toxungenous species of buthid scorpion from Colombia.

== Description ==
Tityus achilles is a medium-sized Tityus species, reaching roughly 65 mm at the adult stage. Specimens of all ages exhibit a uniformly dark-red coloration, with a darker metasoma. It is a nocturnal, litter-dwelling species with no observed arboreal tendencies in juveniles, though the preferred microhabitat of mature specimens remains unclear.

Tityus achilles is currently the only known toxungenous scorpion on the South American continent. When threatened, individuals of this species will engage in defensive spraying: toxins are projected forwards in a continuous stream of toxic secretion, acting as an irritant. The effect of this secretion on human eyes or respiratory tissues is unclear.

Unlike most other scorpions, this species exhibits only a limited level of UV-induced fluorescence.

== Distribution ==
Tityus achilles is currently only known from its type locality in La Vega, Colombia. The exact area of distribution of this scorpion species is unknown.
