= Herbivore =

Organism that eats mostly or exclusively plant material

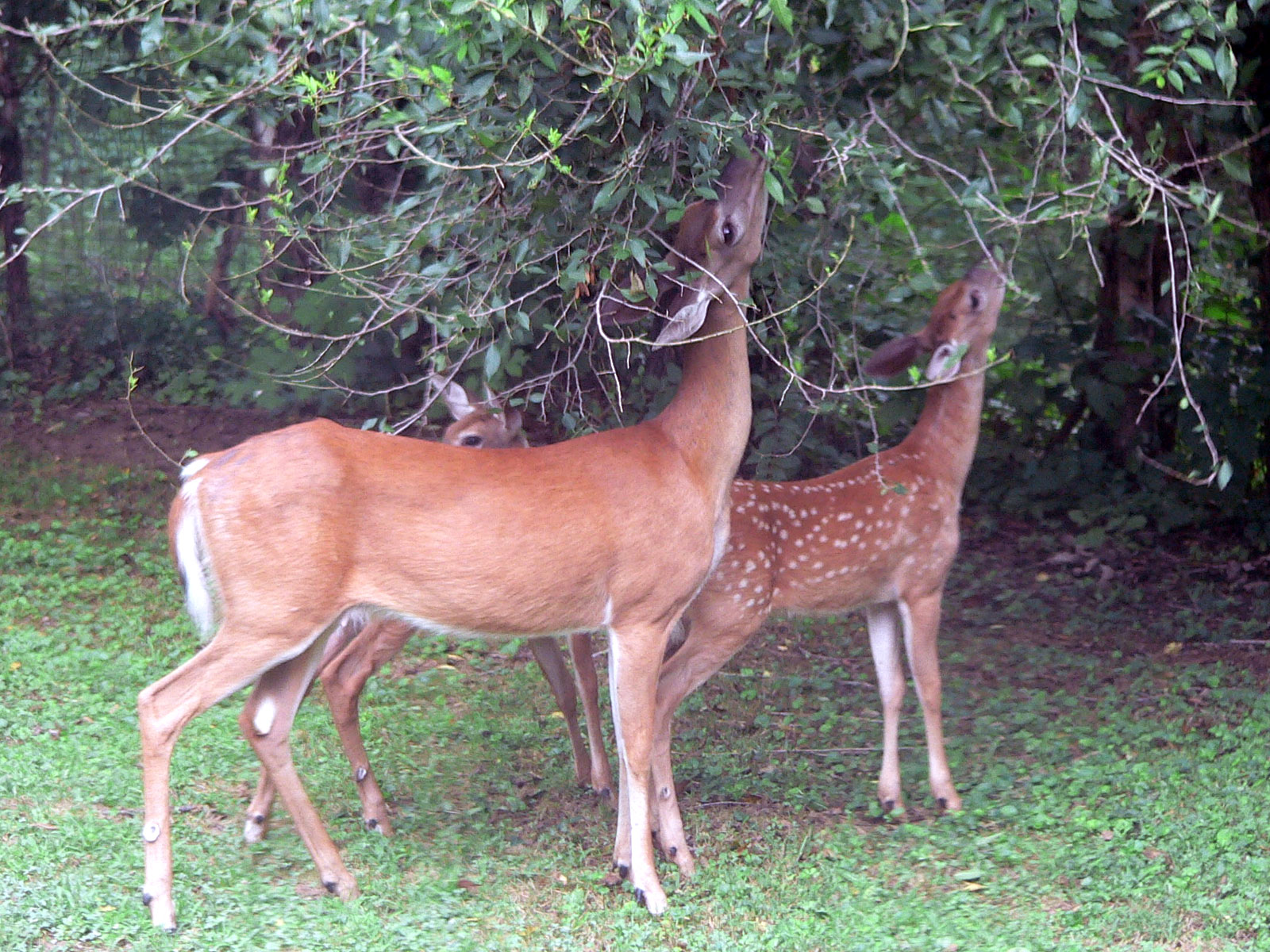
A white-tailed deer and two fawns browsing on foliage

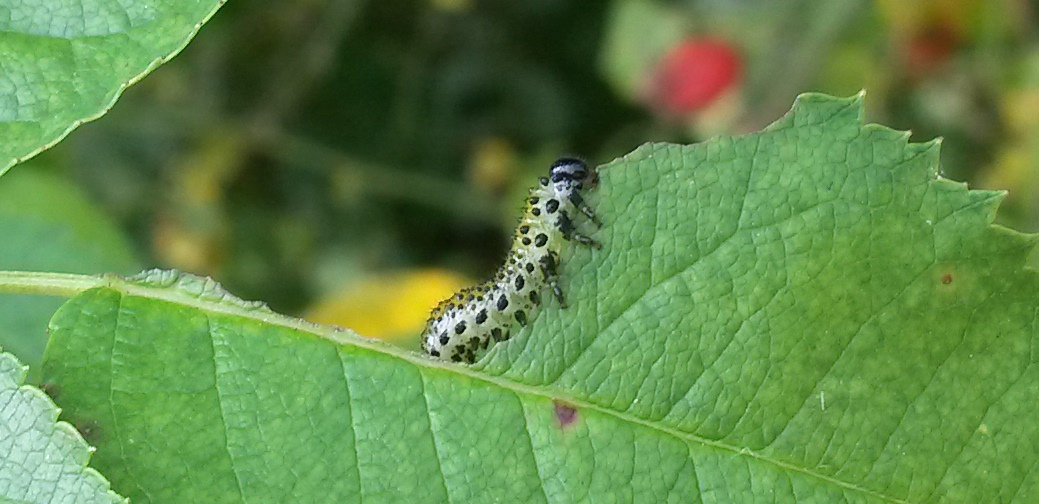
A sawfly larva feeding on a leaf

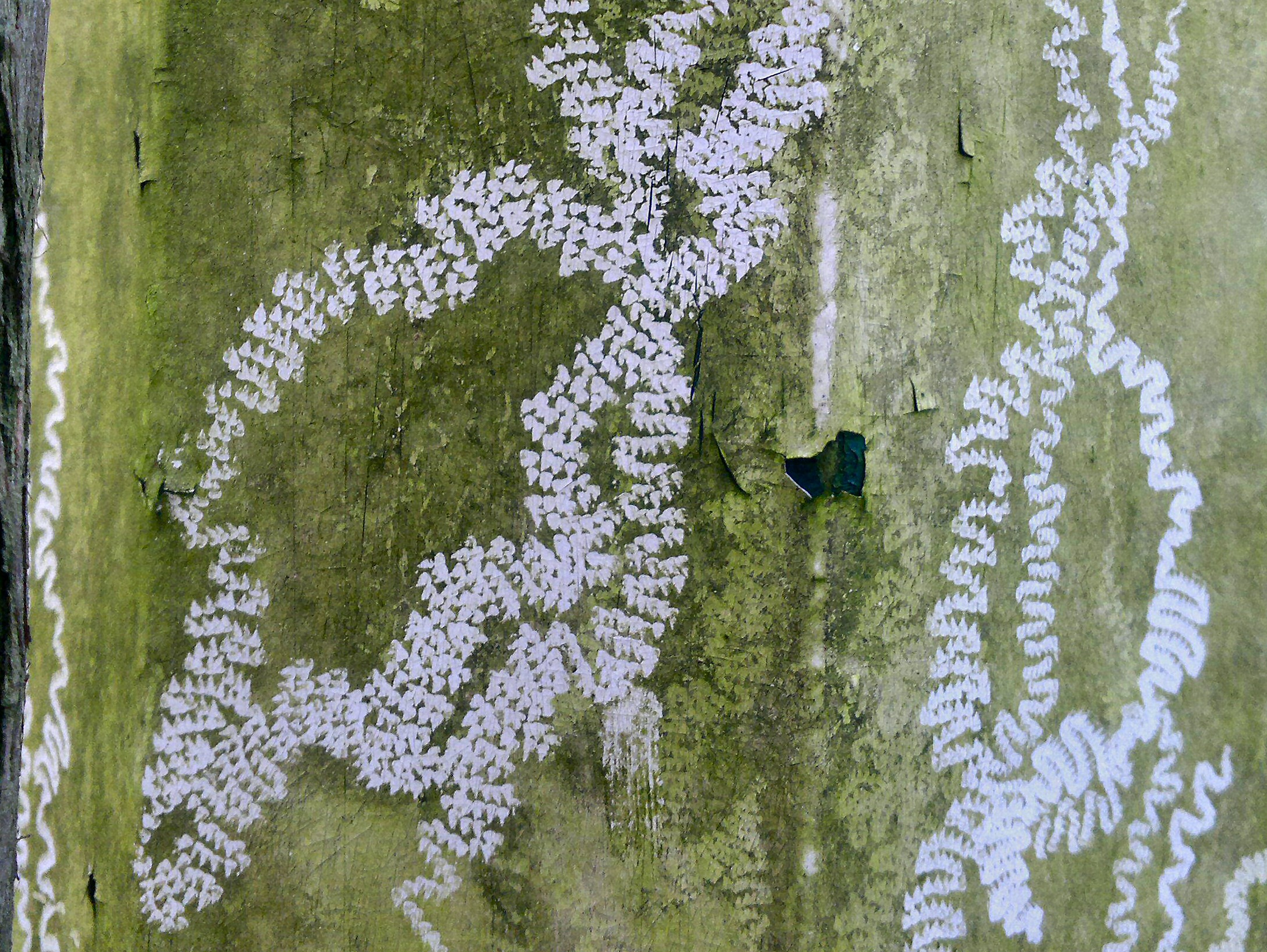
Tracks made by land snails with their radulas, scraping green algae from a surface inside a greenhouse

A herbivore is an animal anatomically or physiologically evolved to feed on plants, especially upon vascular tissues such as foliage, fruits or seeds, as the main component of its diet. These more broadly also encompass animals that eat non-vascular autotrophs such as mosses, algae and lichens, but do not include those feeding on decomposed plant matters (i.e. detritivores) or macrofungi (i.e. fungivores).

As a result of their plant-based diet, herbivorous animals typically have mouth structures (jaws or mouthparts) well adapted to mechanically break down plant materials, and their digestive systems have special enzymes (e.g. amylase and cellulase) to digest polysaccharides. Grazing herbivores such as horses and cattles have wide flat-crowned teeth that are better adapted for grinding grass, tree bark and other tougher lignin-containing materials, and many of them evolved rumination or cecotropic behaviors to better extract nutrients from plants.

A large percentage of herbivores also have mutualistic gut flora made up of bacteria and protozoans that help to degrade the cellulose in plants, whose heavily cross-linking polymer structure makes it far more difficult to digest than the protein- and fat-rich animal tissues that carnivores eat.

== Etymology ==
Herbivore is the anglicized form of a modern Latin coinage, herbivora, cited in Charles Lyell's 1830 Principles of Geology. Richard Owen employed the anglicized term in an 1854 work on fossil teeth and skeletons. Herbivora is derived from Latin herba 'small plant, herb' and vora, from vorare 'to eat, devour'.

== Definition and related terms ==
Herbivory is a form of consumption in which an organism principally eats autotrophs such as plants, algae and photosynthesizing bacteria. More generally, organisms that feed on autotrophs in general are known as primary consumers. Herbivory is usually limited to animals that eat plants. Insect herbivory can cause a variety of physical and metabolic alterations in the way the host plant interacts with itself and other surrounding biotic factors. Fungi, bacteria, and protists that feed on living plants are usually termed plant pathogens (plant diseases), while fungi and microbes that feed on dead plants are described as saprotrophs. Plants that obtain nutrition from other living plants are usually termed parasitic plants. There is, however, no single exclusive and definitive ecological classification of consumption patterns; each textbook has its own variations on the theme.

== Evolution of herbivory ==
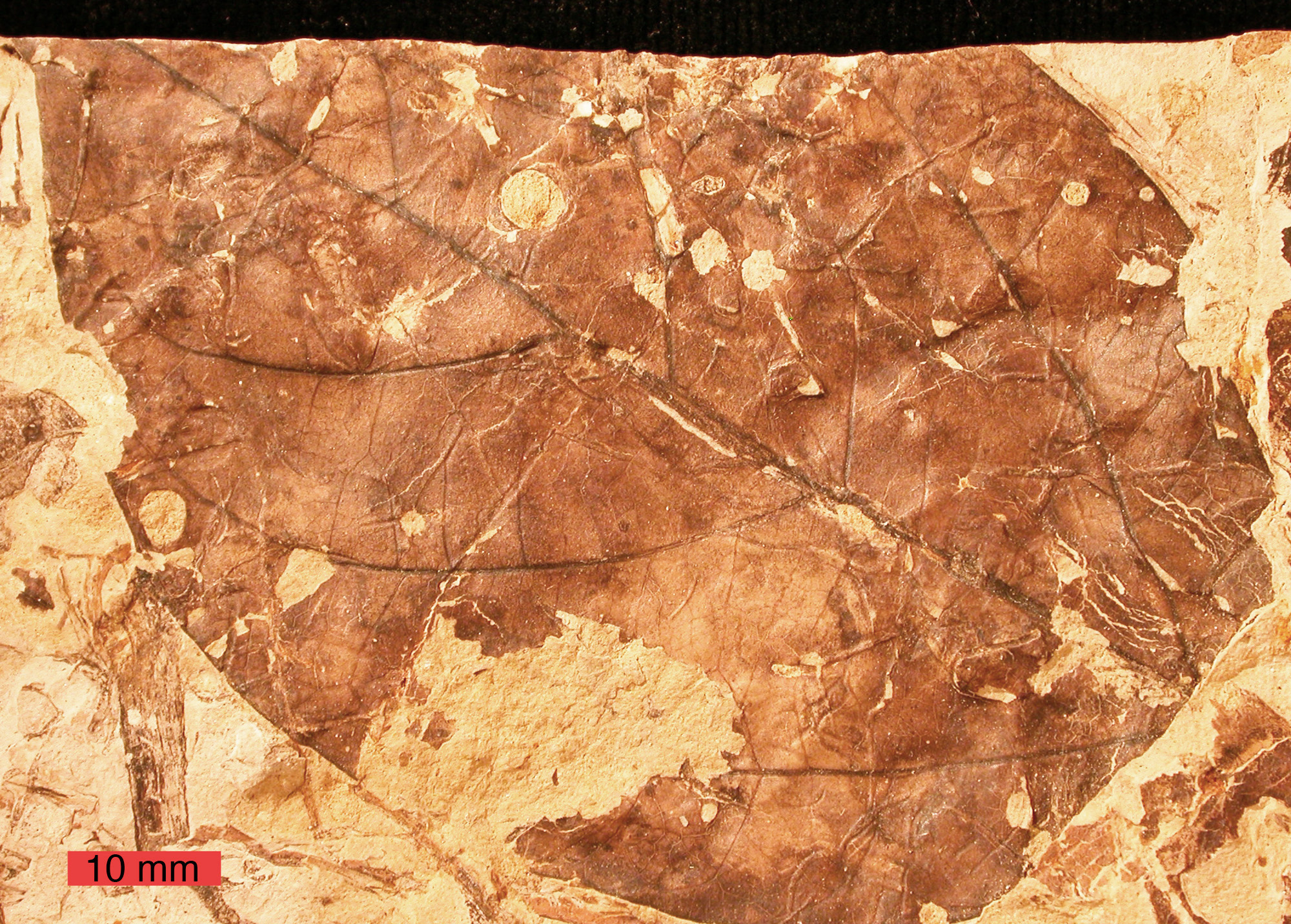
A fossil Viburnum lesquereuxii leaf with evidence of insect herbivory; Dakota Sandstone (Cretaceous) of Ellsworth County, Kansas. Scale bar is 10 mm.

The understanding of herbivory in geological time comes from three sources: fossilized plants, which may preserve evidence of defence (such as spines), or herbivory-related damage; the observation of plant debris in fossilised animal faeces; and the construction of herbivore mouthparts.

Although herbivory was long thought to be a Mesozoic phenomenon, fossils have shown that plants were being consumed by arthropods within less than 20 million years after the first land plants evolved. Insects fed on the spores of early Devonian plants, and the Rhynie chert also provides evidence that organisms fed on plants using a "pierce and suck" technique.

During the next 75 million years, plants evolved a range of more complex organs, such as roots and seeds. There is no evidence of any organism being fed upon until the middle-late Mississippian, 330.3 million years ago. There was a gap of 50 to 100 million years between the time each organ evolved and the time organisms evolved to feed upon them; this may be due to the low levels of oxygen during this period, which may have suppressed evolution. Further than their arthropod status, the identity of these early herbivores is uncertain. Hole feeding and skeletonization are recorded in the early Permian, with surface fluid feeding evolving by the end of that period.

Herbivory among four-limbed terrestrial vertebrates, the tetrapods, developed in the Late Carboniferous (307–299 million years ago). The oldest known herbivorous tetrapods include Desmatodon (Diadectidae) and Tyrannoroter (Pantylidae). Early anamniotic tetrapods were feeding on other aquatic vertebrates and invertebrates, and some amphibians would also evolve into terrestrial carnivores. The first amniotes were insectivores due to their small size, but later forms were larger and carnivious, before some eventually adapted to a herbivorous lifestyle. In addition to Diadectidae, four other tetrapod clades independently evolved adaptations towards herbivory from the Late Carboniferous to early Permian; the Captorhinidae, the parareptilian Bolosauridae, and the two synapsid clades Edaphosauridae and Caseidae. The entire dinosaur order ornithischia, which existed during Jurassic and Cretaceous, was composed of herbivorous dinosaurs. Carnivory was a natural transition from insectivory for medium and large tetrapods, requiring minimal adaptation. In contrast, a complex set of adaptations was necessary for feeding on highly fibrous plant materials.

Arthropods evolved herbivory in four phases, changing their approach to it in response to changing plant communities. Tetrapod herbivores made their first appearance in the fossil record of their jaws near the Permio-Carboniferous boundary, approximately 300 million years ago. The earliest evidence of their herbivory has been attributed to dental occlusion, the process in which teeth from the upper jaw come in contact with teeth in the lower jaw is present. The evolution of dental occlusion led to a drastic increase in plant food processing and provides evidence about feeding strategies based on tooth wear patterns. Examination of phylogenetic frameworks of tooth and jaw morphologies has revealed that dental occlusion developed independently in several lineages tetrapod herbivores. This suggests that evolution and spread occurred simultaneously within various lineages.

== Food chain ==
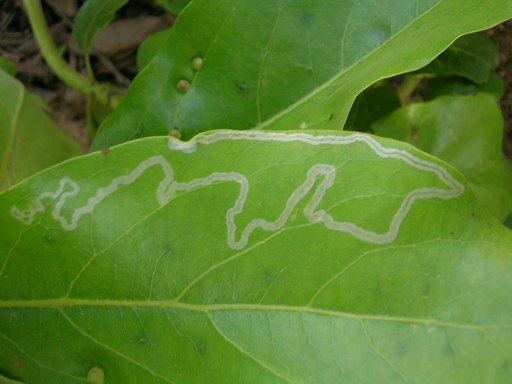
Leaf miners feed on leaf tissue between the epidermal layers, leaving visible trails.

Herbivores form an important link in the food chain because they consume plants to digest the carbohydrates photosynthetically produced by a plant. Carnivores in turn consume herbivores for the same reason, while omnivores can obtain their nutrients from either plants or animals. Due to a herbivore's ability to survive solely on tough and fibrous plant matter, they are termed the primary consumers in the food cycle (chain). Herbivory, carnivory, and omnivory can be regarded as special cases of consumer–resource interactions.

== Feeding strategies ==
Two herbivore feeding strategies are grazing (e.g. cows) and browsing (e.g. moose). For a terrestrial mammal to be called a grazer, at least 90% of the forage has to be grass, and for a browser at least 90% tree leaves and twigs. An intermediate feeding strategy is called "mixed-feeding". In their daily need to take up energy from forage, herbivores of different body mass may be selective in choosing their food. "Selective" means that herbivores may choose their forage source depending on, e.g., season or food availability, but also that they may choose high quality (and consequently highly nutritious) forage before lower quality. The latter especially is determined by the body mass of the herbivore, with small herbivores selecting for high-quality forage, and with increasing body mass animals are less selective. Several theories attempt to explain and quantify the relationship between animals and their food, such as Kleiber's law, Holling's disk equation and the marginal value theorem (see below).

Kleiber's law describes the relationship between an animal's size and its feeding strategy, saying that larger animals need to eat less food per unit weight than smaller animals. Kleiber's law states that the metabolic rate (q_{0}) of an animal is the mass of the animal (M) raised to the 3/4 power: q_{0}=M^{3/4}

Therefore, the mass of the animal increases at a faster rate than the metabolic rate.

Herbivores employ numerous types of feeding strategies. Many herbivores do not fall into one specific feeding strategy, but employ several strategies and eat a variety of plant parts.

Types of feeding strategies
Feeding Strategy	Diet	Examples
Algivores	Algae	Krill, crabs, sea snail, sea urchin, parrotfish, surgeonfish, flamingo
Frugivores	Fruit	Ruffed lemurs, orangutans
Folivores	Leaves	Koalas, gorillas, red colobuses, many leaf beetles
Nectarivores	Nectar	Honey possums, hummingbirds
Granivores	Seeds	Hawaiian honeycreepers, bean weevils
Graminivores	Grass	Horses
Palynivores	Pollen	Bees
Mucivores	Plant fluids, i.e. sap	Aphids
Xylophages	Wood	Termites, longicorn beetles, ambrosia beetles

Optimal foraging theory is a model for predicting animal behavior while looking for food or other resources, such as shelter or water. This model assesses both individual movement, such as animal behavior while looking for food, and distribution within a habitat, such as dynamics at the population and community level. For example, the model would be used to look at the browsing behavior of a deer while looking for food, as well as that deer's specific location and movement within the forested habitat and its interaction with other deer while in that habitat.

This model has been criticized as circular and untestable. Critics have pointed out that its proponents use examples that fit the theory, but do not use the model when it does not fit the reality. Other critics point out that animals do not have the ability to assess and maximize their potential gains, therefore the optimal foraging theory is irrelevant and derived to explain trends that do not exist in nature.

Holling's disk equation models the efficiency at which predators consume prey. The model predicts that as the number of prey increases, the amount of time predators spend handling prey also increases, and therefore the efficiency of the predator decreases. In 1959, S. Holling proposed an equation to model the rate of return for an optimal diet: Rate (R )=Energy gained in foraging (Ef)/(time searching (Ts) + time handling (Th))
$R=Ef/(Ts + Th)$

Where s=cost of search per unit time f=rate of encounter with items, h=handling time, e=energy gained per encounter.

In effect, this would indicate that a herbivore in a dense forest would spend more time handling (eating) the vegetation because there was so much vegetation around than a herbivore in a sparse forest, who could easily browse through the forest vegetation. According to the Holling's disk equation, a herbivore in the sparse forest would be more efficient at eating than the herbivore in the dense forest.

The marginal value theorem describes the balance between eating all the food in a patch for immediate energy, or moving to a new patch and leaving the plants in the first patch to regenerate for future use. The theory predicts that absent complicating factors, an animal should leave a resource patch when the rate of payoff (amount of food) falls below the average rate of payoff for the entire area. According to this theory, an animal should move to a new patch of food when the patch they are currently feeding on requires more energy to obtain food than an average patch. Within this theory, two subsequent parameters emerge, the Giving Up Density (GUD) and the Giving Up Time (GUT). The Giving Up Density (GUD) quantifies the amount of food that remains in a patch when a forager moves to a new patch. The Giving Up Time (GUT) is used when an animal continuously assesses the patch quality.

== Plant-herbivore interactions ==
Interactions between plants and herbivores can play a prevalent role in ecosystem dynamics such community structure and functional processes. Plant diversity and distribution is often driven by herbivory, and it is likely that trade-offs between plant competitiveness and defensiveness, and between colonization and mortality allow for coexistence between species in the presence of herbivores. However, the effects of herbivory on plant diversity and richness is variable. For example, increased abundance of herbivores such as deer decrease plant diversity and species richness, while other large mammalian herbivores like bison control dominant species which allows other species to flourish. Plant-herbivore interactions can also operate so that plant communities mediate herbivore communities. Plant communities that are more diverse typically sustain greater herbivore richness by providing a greater and more diverse set of resources.

Coevolution and phylogenetic correlation between herbivores and plants are important aspects of the influence of herbivore and plant interactions on communities and ecosystem functioning, especially in regard to herbivorous insects. This is apparent in the adaptations plants develop to tolerate and/or defend from insect herbivory and the responses of herbivores to overcome these adaptations. The evolution of antagonistic and mutualistic plant-herbivore interactions are not mutually exclusive and may co-occur. Plant phylogeny has been found to facilitate the colonization and community assembly of herbivores, and there is evidence of phylogenetic linkage between plant beta diversity and phylogenetic beta diversity of insect clades such as butterflies. These types of eco-evolutionary feedbacks between plants and herbivores are likely the main driving force behind plant and herbivore diversity.

Abiotic factors such as climate and biogeographical features also impact plant-herbivore communities and interactions. For example, in temperate freshwater wetlands herbivorous waterfowl communities change according to season, with species that eat above-ground vegetation being abundant during summer, and species that forage below-ground being present in winter months. These seasonal herbivore communities differ in both their assemblage and functions within the wetland ecosystem. Such differences in herbivore modalities can potentially lead to trade-offs that influence species traits and may lead to additive effects on community composition and ecosystem functioning. Seasonal changes and environmental gradients such as elevation and latitude often affect the palatability of plants which in turn influences herbivore community assemblages and vice versa. Examples include a decrease in abundance of leaf-chewing larvae in the fall when hardwood leaf palatability decreases due to increased tannin levels which results in a decline of arthropod species richness, and increased palatability of plant communities at higher elevations where grasshoppers abundances are lower. Climatic stressors such as ocean acidification can lead to responses in plant-herbivore interactions in relation to palatability as well.

=== Herbivore offense ===
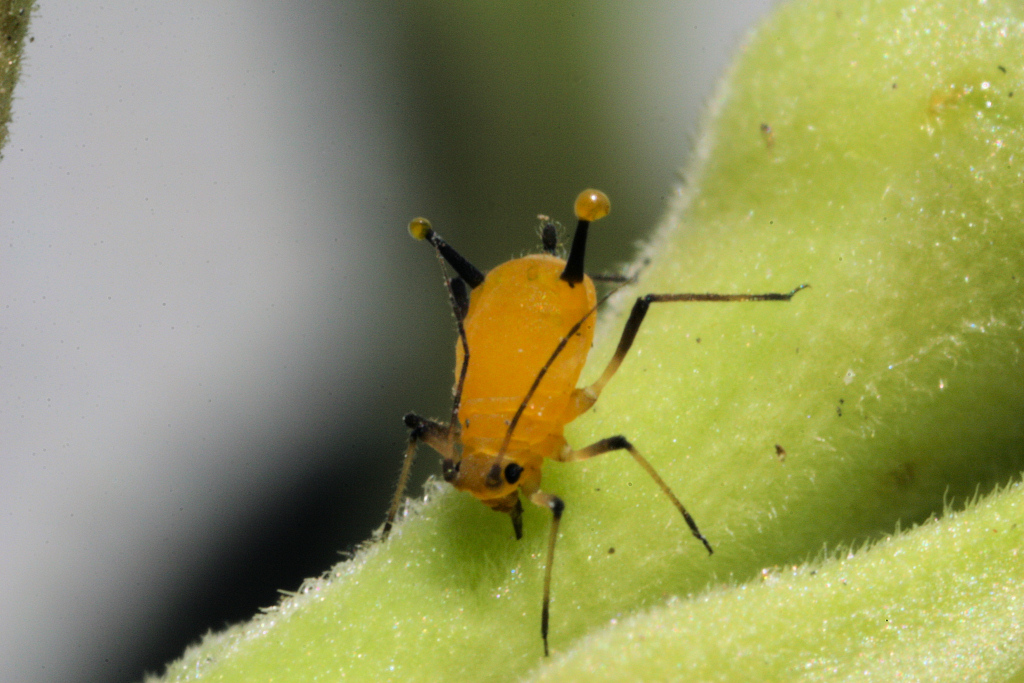
Aphids are fluid feeders on plant sap.

The myriad defenses displayed by plants means that their herbivores need a variety of skills to overcome these defenses and obtain food. These allow herbivores to increase their feeding and use of a host plant. Herbivores have three primary strategies for dealing with plant defenses: choice, herbivore modification, and plant modification.

Feeding choice involves which plants a herbivore chooses to consume. It has been suggested that many herbivores feed on a variety of plants to balance their nutrient uptake and to avoid consuming too much of any one type of defensive chemical. This involves a tradeoff however, between foraging on many plant species to avoid toxins or specializing on one type of plant that can be detoxified.

Herbivore modification is when various adaptations to body or digestive systems of the herbivore allow them to overcome plant defenses. This might include detoxifying secondary metabolites, sequestering toxins unaltered, or avoiding toxins, such as through the production of large amounts of saliva to reduce effectiveness of defenses. Herbivores may also utilize symbionts to evade plant defenses. For example, some aphids use bacteria in their gut to provide essential amino acids lacking in their sap diet.

Plant modification occurs when herbivores manipulate their plant prey to increase feeding. For example, some caterpillars roll leaves to reduce the effectiveness of plant defenses activated by sunlight.

=== Plant defense ===
A plant defense is a trait that increases plant fitness when faced with herbivory. This is measured relative to another plant that lacks the defensive trait. Plant defenses increase survival and/or reproduction (fitness) of plants under pressure of predation from herbivores.

Defense can be divided into two main categories, tolerance and resistance. Tolerance is the ability of a plant to withstand damage without a reduction in fitness. This can occur by diverting herbivory to non-essential plant parts, resource allocation, compensatory growth, or by rapid regrowth and recovery from herbivory. Resistance refers to the ability of a plant to reduce the amount of damage it receives from herbivores. This can occur via avoidance in space or time, physical defenses, or chemical defenses. Defenses can either be constitutive, always present in the plant, or induced, produced or translocated by the plant following damage or stress.

Physical, or mechanical, defenses are barriers or structures designed to deter herbivores or reduce intake rates, lowering overall herbivory. Thorns such as those found on acacia trees are one example, as are the spines on a cactus or the prickles on roses. Smaller hairs known as trichomes may cover leaves or stems and are especially effective against invertebrate herbivores. In addition, some plants have waxes or resins that alter their texture, making them difficult to eat. Also the incorporation of silica into cell walls is analogous to that of the role of lignin in that it is a compression-resistant structural component of cell walls; so that plants with their cell walls impregnated with silica are thereby afforded a measure of protection against herbivory.

Chemical defenses are secondary metabolites produced by the plant that deter herbivory. There are a wide variety of these in nature and a single plant can have hundreds of different chemical defenses. Chemical defenses can be divided into two main groups, carbon-based defenses and nitrogen-based defenses.

1. Carbon-based defenses include terpenes and phenolics. Terpenes are derived from 5-carbon isoprene units and comprise essential oils, carotenoids, resins, and latex. They can have several functions that disrupt herbivores such as inhibiting adenosine triphosphate (ATP) formation, molting hormones, or the nervous system. Phenolics combine an aromatic carbon ring with a hydroxyl group. There are several different phenolics such as lignins, which are found in cell walls and are very indigestible except for specialized microorganisms; tannins, which have a bitter taste and bind to proteins making them indigestible; and furanocoumarins, which produce free radicals disrupting DNA, protein, and lipids, and can cause skin irritation.
2. Nitrogen-based defenses are synthesized from amino acids and primarily come in the form of alkaloids and cyanogens. Alkaloids include commonly recognized substances such as caffeine, nicotine, and morphine. These compounds are often bitter and can inhibit DNA or RNA synthesis or block nervous system signal transmission. Cyanogens get their name from the cyanide stored within their tissues. This is released when the plant is damaged and inhibits cellular respiration and electron transport.

Plants have also changed features that enhance the probability of attracting natural enemies to herbivores. Some emit semiochemicals, odors that attract natural enemies, while others provide food and housing to maintain the natural enemies' presence, e.g. ants that reduce herbivory. A given plant species often has many types of defensive mechanisms, mechanical or chemical, constitutive or induced, which allow it to escape from herbivores.

=== Predator–prey theory ===
According to the theory of predator–prey interactions, the relationship between herbivores and plants is cyclic. When prey (plants) are numerous their predators (herbivores) increase in numbers, reducing the prey population, which in turn causes predator number to decline. The prey population eventually recovers, starting a new cycle. This suggests that the population of the herbivore fluctuates around the carrying capacity of the food source, in this case, the plant.

Several factors play into these fluctuating populations and help stabilize predator-prey dynamics. For example, spatial heterogeneity is maintained, which means there will always be pockets of plants not found by herbivores. This stabilizing dynamic plays an especially important role for specialist herbivores that feed on one species of plant and prevents these specialists from wiping out their food source. Prey defenses also help stabilize predator-prey dynamics, and for more information on these relationships see the section on Plant Defenses. Eating a second prey type helps herbivores' populations stabilize. Alternating between two or more plant types provides population stability for the herbivore, while the populations of the plants oscillate. This plays an important role for generalist herbivores that eat a variety of plants. Keystone herbivores keep vegetation populations in check and allow for a greater diversity of both herbivores and plants. When an invasive herbivore or plant enters the system, the balance is thrown off and the diversity can collapse to a monotaxon system.

The back and forth relationship of plant defense and herbivore offense drives coevolution between plants and herbivores, resulting in a "coevolutionary arms race". The escape and radiation mechanisms for coevolution, presents the idea that adaptations in herbivores and their host plants, has been the driving force behind speciation.

=== Mutualism ===
While much of the interaction of herbivory and plant defense is negative, with one individual reducing the fitness of the other, some is beneficial. This beneficial herbivory takes the form of mutualisms in which both partners benefit in some way from the interaction. Seed dispersal by herbivores and pollination are two forms of mutualistic herbivory in which the herbivore receives a food resource and the plant is aided in reproduction. Plants can also be indirectly affected by herbivores through nutrient recycling, with plants benefiting from herbivores when nutrients are recycled very efficiently. Another form of plant-herbivore mutualism is physical changes to the environment and/or plant community structure by herbivores which serve as ecosystem engineers, such as wallowing by bison. Swans form a mutual relationship with the plant species that they forage by digging and disturbing the sediment which removes competing plants and subsequently allows colonization of other plant species.

== Impacts ==
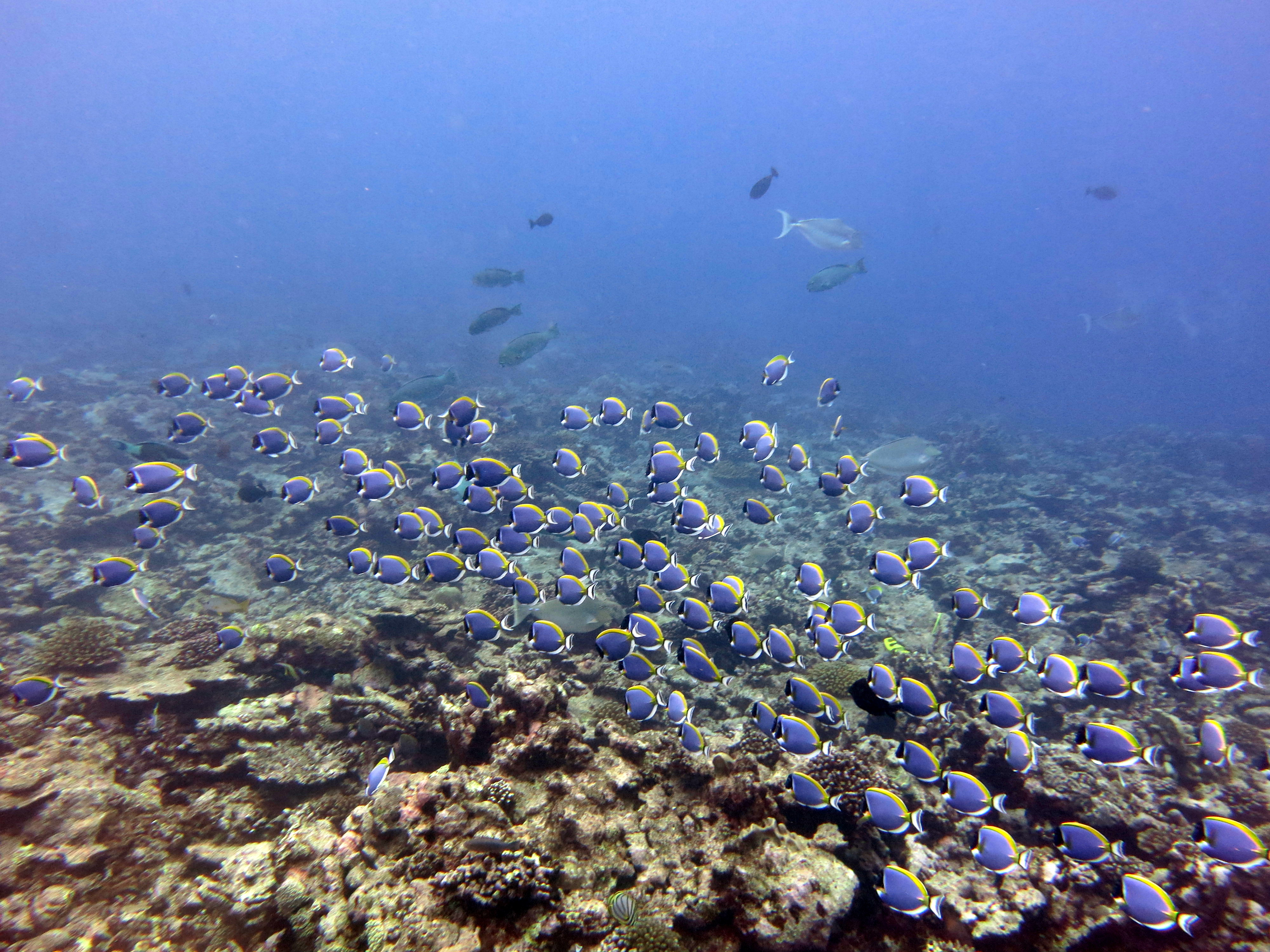
Mixed feeding shoal of herbivorous fish on a coral reef

=== Trophic cascades and environmental degradation ===
When herbivores are affected by trophic cascades, plant communities can be indirectly affected. Often these effects are felt when predator populations decline and herbivore populations are no longer limited, which leads to intense herbivore foraging which can suppress plant communities. With the size of herbivores having an effect on the amount of energy intake that is needed, larger herbivores need to forage on higher quality or more plants to gain the optimal amount of nutrients and energy compared to smaller herbivores. Environmental degradation from white-tailed deer (Odocoileus virginianus) in the US alone has the potential to both change vegetative communities through over-browsing and cost forest restoration projects upwards of $750 million annually. Another example of a trophic cascade involved plant-herbivore interactions are coral reef ecosystems. Herbivorous fish and marine animals are important algae and seaweed grazers, and in the absence of plant-eating fish, corals are outcompeted and seaweeds deprive corals of sunlight.

=== Economic impacts ===
Agricultural crop damage by the same species totals approximately $100 million every year. Insect crop damages also contribute largely to annual crop losses in the U.S. Herbivores also affect economics through the revenue generated by hunting and ecotourism. For example, the hunting of herbivorous game species such as white-tailed deer, cottontail rabbits, antelope, and elk in the U.S. contributes greatly to the billion-dollar annually, hunting industry. Ecotourism is a major source of revenue, particularly in Africa, where many large mammalian herbivores such as elephants, zebras, and giraffes help to bring in the equivalent of millions of US dollars to various nations annually.

== See also ==
- Carnivore and omnivore
- Consumer-resource systems
- List of feeding behaviours
- List of herbivorous animals
- Plant-based diet
- Productivity (ecology)
- Seed predation
- Tritrophic interactions in plant defense
- Veganism
- Vegetarianism
