= Venom =

Toxin secreted by an animal

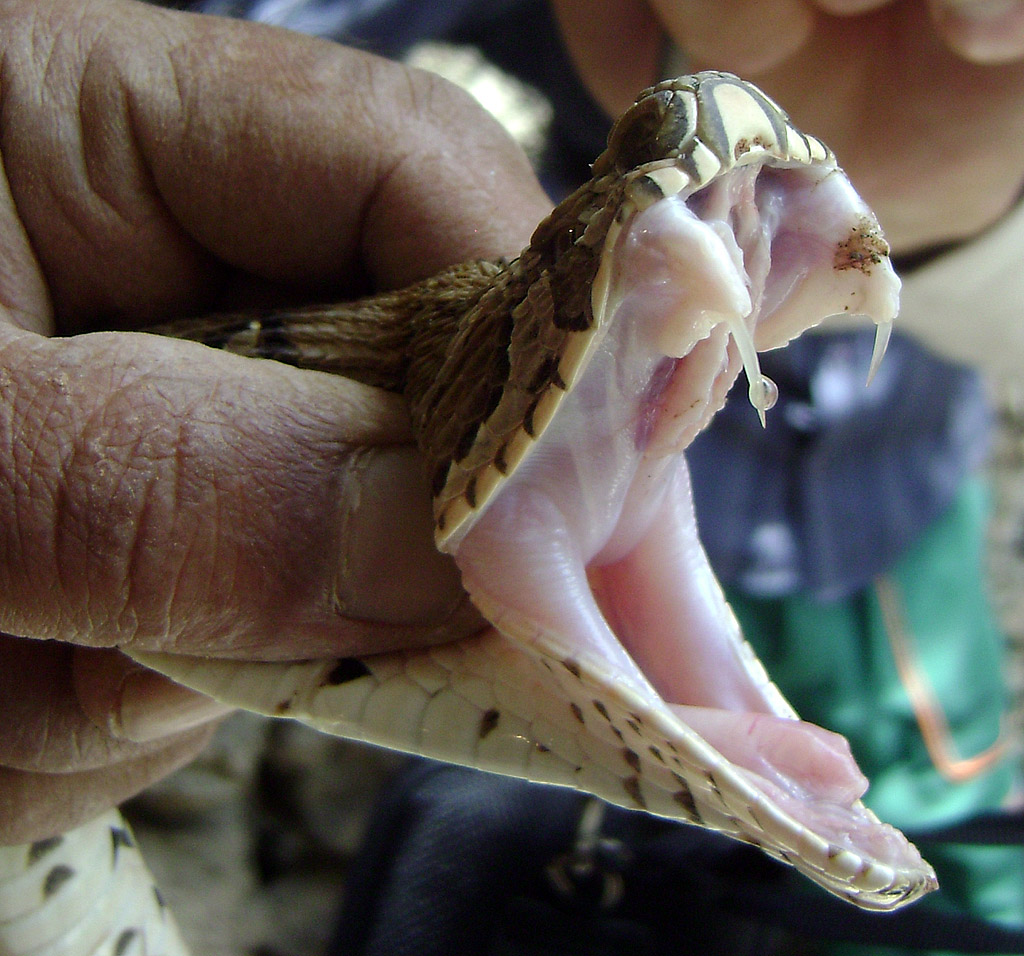
Russell's viper fang with a droplet of venom

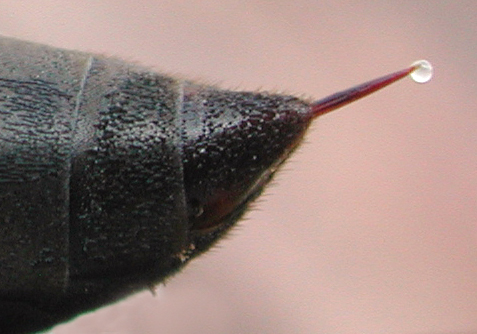
Wasp stinger with a droplet of venom

Venom or zootoxin is a type of toxin produced by an animal that is actively delivered to other animals through a wound by means of a bite, sting or similar penetrative action, usually via a specially evolved venom apparatus, such as fangs or a stinger, in a process called envenomation. Venoms are often distinguished from poisons, which is passively delivered by being ingested, inhaled, or absorbed through the skin; and toxungen, which is actively transferred to the external surface of another animal via a physical delivery mechanism.

Venom has evolved in terrestrial and aquatic environments and in a wide variety of animals: both predators and prey, and both vertebrates and invertebrates. Venoms kill through the action of at least four major classes of toxin, namely necrotoxins and cytotoxins, which kill cells; neurotoxins, which affect nervous systems; myotoxins, which damage muscles; and haemotoxins, which disrupt blood clotting. Venomous animals cause tens of thousands of human deaths per year.

Venoms are often complex mixtures of toxins of differing types. Toxins from venom are used to treat a wide range of medical conditions including thrombosis, arthritis, and some cancers. Studies in venomics are investigating the potential use of venom toxins for many other conditions.

== Evolution ==
The use of venom across a wide variety of taxa is an example of convergent evolution. In animals, venom usage has evolved independently at least 104 times, across 8 phyla. It is difficult to conclude exactly how this trait came to be so intensely widespread and diversified. The multigene families that encode the toxins of venomous animals are actively selected, creating more diverse toxins with specific functions.

Also, a number of animal species have been demonstrated to acquire venom toxins from other sources, notably from associated microbes, which may even inhabit their venom apparatuses.

Venoms adapt to their environment and victims, evolving to become maximally efficient on a predator's particular prey (particularly the precise ion channels within the prey). Consequently, some venoms may become specialized to an animal's standard diet.

== Mechanisms ==
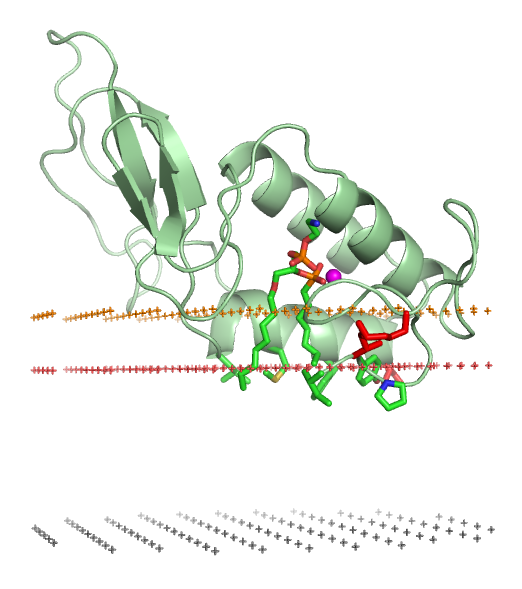
Phospholipase A2, an enzyme in bee venom, releases fatty acids, affecting calcium signalling.

Venoms cause their biological effects via the many toxins that they contain; some venoms are complex mixtures of toxins of differing types. Major classes of toxin in venoms include:

- Neurotoxins, which primarily affect the nervous systems of animals, such as ion channel toxins. These are found in many venomous taxa, including mambas, black widow spiders, scorpions, box jellyfish, cone snails, centipedes and blue-ringed octopuses.
- Myotoxins, which damage muscles by binding to a receptor. These small, basic peptides are found in snake (such as rattlesnake) and lizard venoms.
- Cytotoxins, which kill individual cells and are found in the apitoxin of honey bees and the venom of black widow spiders.

A subclass of cytotoxins is the necrotoxins, which cause necrosis (i.e., death) in the cells and tissues they encounter. The complex venoms of vipers and bees contain phospholipases; viper venoms often also contain trypsin-like serine proteases.

== Taxonomic range ==
Venom is widely distributed taxonomically, being found in both invertebrates and vertebrates, in aquatic and terrestrial animals, and among both predators and prey. The major groups of venomous animals are described below.

=== Arthropods ===
Venomous arthropods include spiders, which use fangs on their chelicerae to inject venom, and centipedes, which use forcipules — modified legs — to deliver venom, while scorpions and stinging insects inject venom with a sting. In bees and wasps, the stinger is a modified ovipositor (egg-laying device). In Polistes fuscatus, the female continuously releases a venom that contains a sex pheromone that induces copulatory behavior in males. In wasps such as Polistes exclamans, venom is used as an alarm pheromone, coordinating a response from the nest and attracting nearby wasps to attack the predator. In some species, such as Parischnogaster striatula, venom is applied all over the body as an antimicrobial protection.

Many caterpillars have defensive venom glands associated with specialized bristles on the body called urticating hairs. These are usually merely irritating, but those of the Lonomia moth can be fatal to humans.

Bees synthesize and employ an acidic venom (apitoxin) to defend their hives and food stores, whereas wasps use a chemically different venom to paralyse prey, so their prey remains alive to provision the food chambers of their young. The use of venom is much more widespread than just these examples; many other insects, such as true bugs and many ants, also produce venom. The ant species Polyrhachis dives uses venom topically for the sterilisation of pathogens.

=== Other invertebrates ===
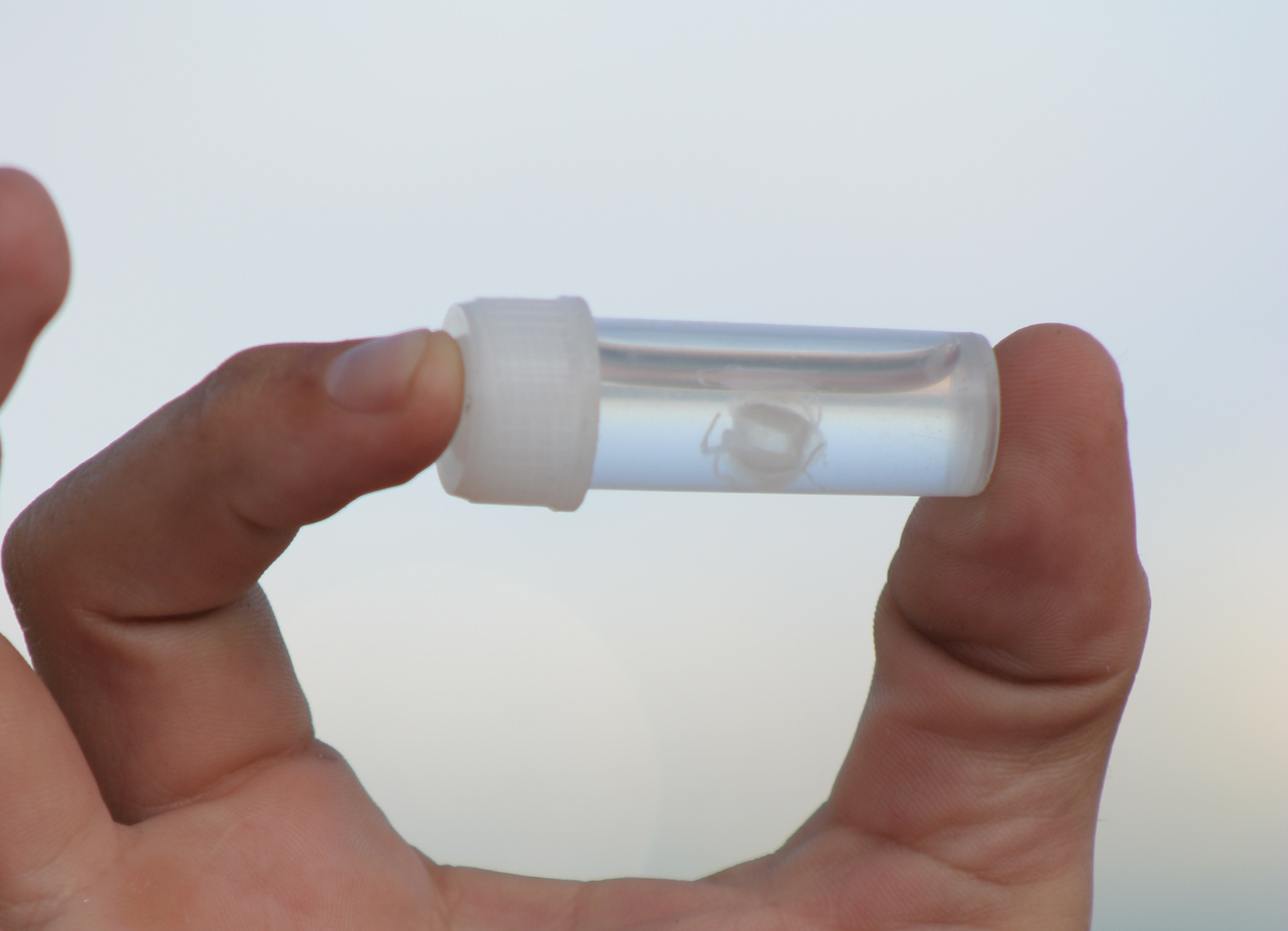
The fingernail-sized box jellyfish Malo kingi has among the most dangerous venom of any animal, causing Irukandji syndrome — severe pain, vomiting, and rapid rise in blood pressure

There are venomous invertebrates in several phyla, including jellyfish such as the dangerous box jellyfish, the Portuguese man-of-war (a siphonophore) and sea anemones among the Cnidaria, sea urchins among the Echinodermata, and cone snails and cephalopods, including octopuses, among the Molluscs.

=== Vertebrates ===
==== Fish ====
Venom is found in some 200 cartilaginous fishes, including stingrays, sharks, and chimaeras; the catfishes (about 1,000 venomous species); and 11 clades of spiny-rayed fishes (Acanthomorpha), containing the scorpionfishes (over 300 species), stonefishes (over 80 species), gurnard perches, blennies, rabbitfishes, surgeonfishes, some velvetfishes, some toadfishes, coral crouchers, red velvetfishes, scats, rockfishes, deepwater scorpionfishes, waspfishes, weevers, and stargazers.

==== Amphibians ====
Some salamanders can extrude sharp venom-tipped ribs. Two frog species in Brazil have tiny spines around the crown of their skulls which, on impact, deliver venom into their targets.

==== Reptiles ====
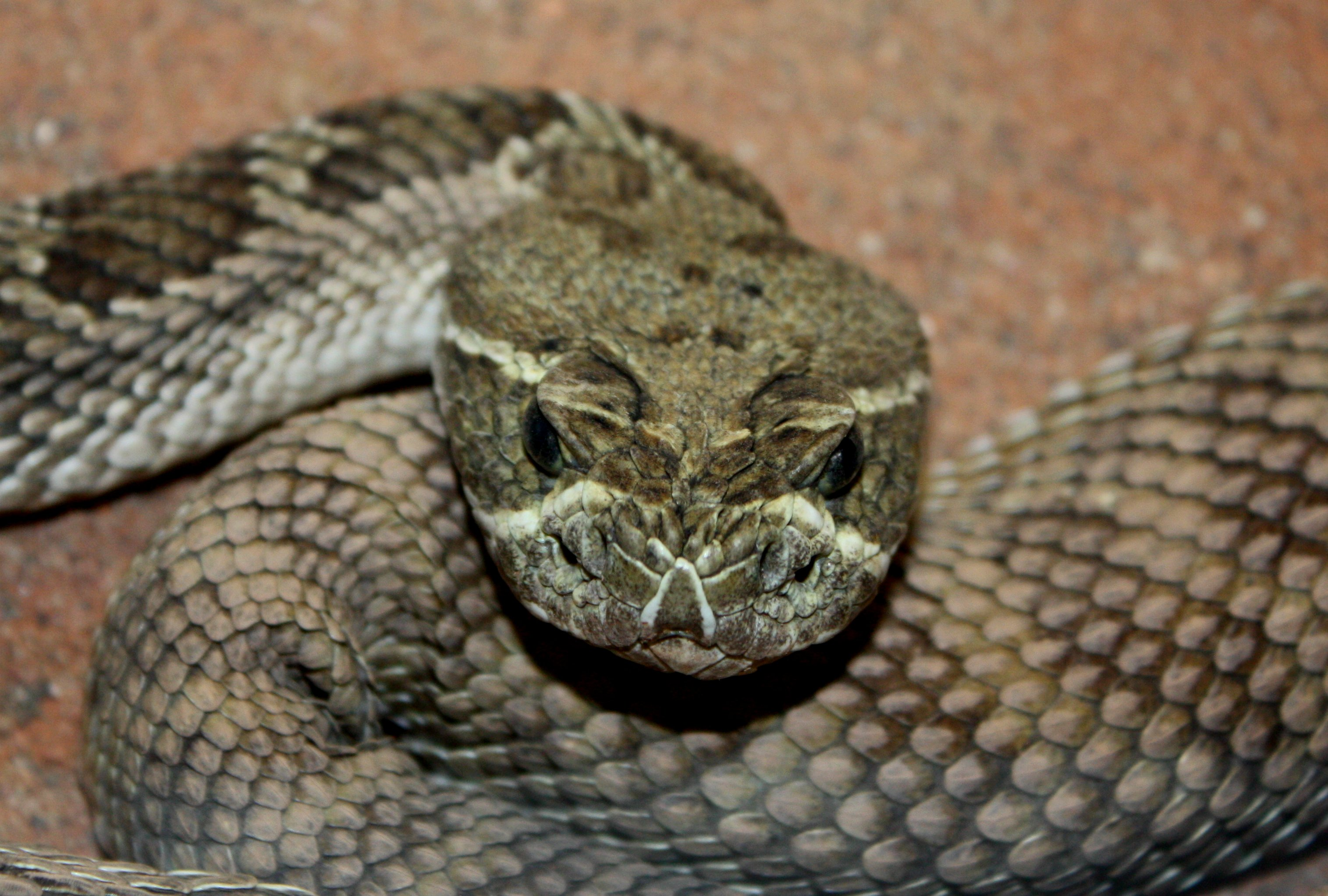
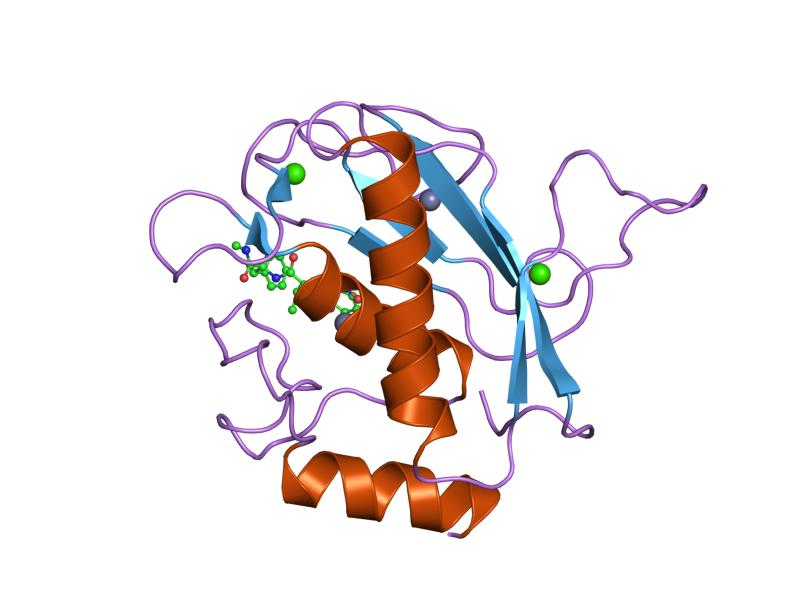
The venom of the prairie rattlesnake, Crotalus viridis (left), includes metalloproteinases (example on the right) which help digest prey before eating.

Some 450 species of snake are venomous. Snake venom is produced by glands below the eye (the mandibular glands) and delivered to the target through tubular or channeled fangs. Snake venoms contain a variety of peptide toxins, including proteases, which hydrolyze protein peptide bonds; nucleases, which hydrolyze the phosphodiester bonds of DNA; and neurotoxins, which disrupt signalling in the nervous system. Snake venom causes symptoms including pain, swelling, tissue necrosis, low blood pressure, convulsions, haemorrhage (varying by species of snake), respiratory paralysis, kidney failure, coma, and death. Snake venom may have originated with duplication of genes that had been expressed in the salivary glands of ancestors.

Venom is found in a few other reptiles such as the Mexican beaded lizard, the gila monster, and some monitor lizards, including the Komodo dragon. Mass spectrometry showed that the mixture of proteins present in their venom is as complex as the mixture of proteins found in snake venom. Some lizards possess a venom gland; they form a hypothetical clade, Toxicofera, containing the suborders Serpentes and Iguania and the families Varanidae, Anguidae, and Helodermatidae.

==== Mammals ====
Euchambersia, an extinct genus of therocephalians, is hypothesized to have had venom glands attached to its canine teeth.

A few species of living mammals are venomous, including solenodons, shrews, the European mole, vampire bats, male platypuses, and slow lorises. Shrews have venomous saliva and most likely evolved their trait similarly to snakes. The presence of tarsal spurs akin to those of the platypus in many non-therian Mammaliaformes groups suggests that venom was an ancestral characteristic among mammals.

Extensive research on platypuses shows that their toxin was initially formed from gene duplication, but data provides evidence that the further evolution of platypus venom does not rely as much on gene duplication as was once thought. Modified sweat glands are what evolved into platypus venom glands. Although it is proven that reptile and platypus venom have independently evolved, it is thought that there are certain protein structures that are favored to evolve into toxic molecules. This provides more evidence of why venom has become a homoplastic trait and why very different animals have convergently evolved.

== Humans ==
Deaths from venomous animal contact

Envenomation resulted in 57,000 human deaths in 2013, down from 76,000 deaths in 1990. Venoms, found in over 173,000 species, have potential to treat a wide range of diseases, explored in over 5,000 scientific papers.

In medicine, snake venom proteins are used to treat conditions including thrombosis, arthritis, and some cancers. Gila monster venom contains exenatide, used to treat type 2 diabetes. Solenopsins extracted from fire ant venom has demonstrated biomedical applications, ranging from cancer treatment to psoriasis. A branch of science, venomics, has been established to study the proteins associated with venom and how individual components of venom can be used for pharmaceutical means.

== Resistance ==
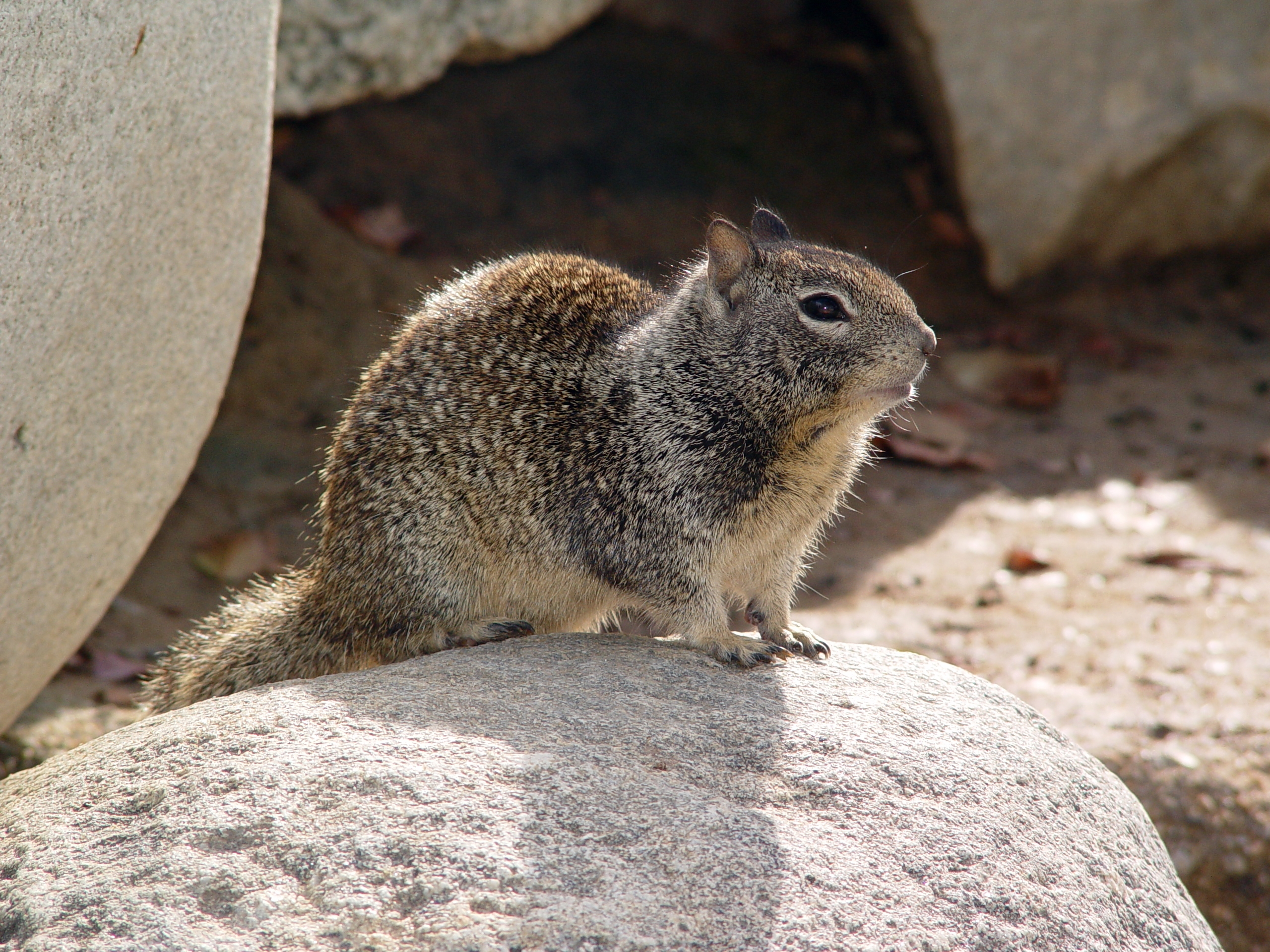
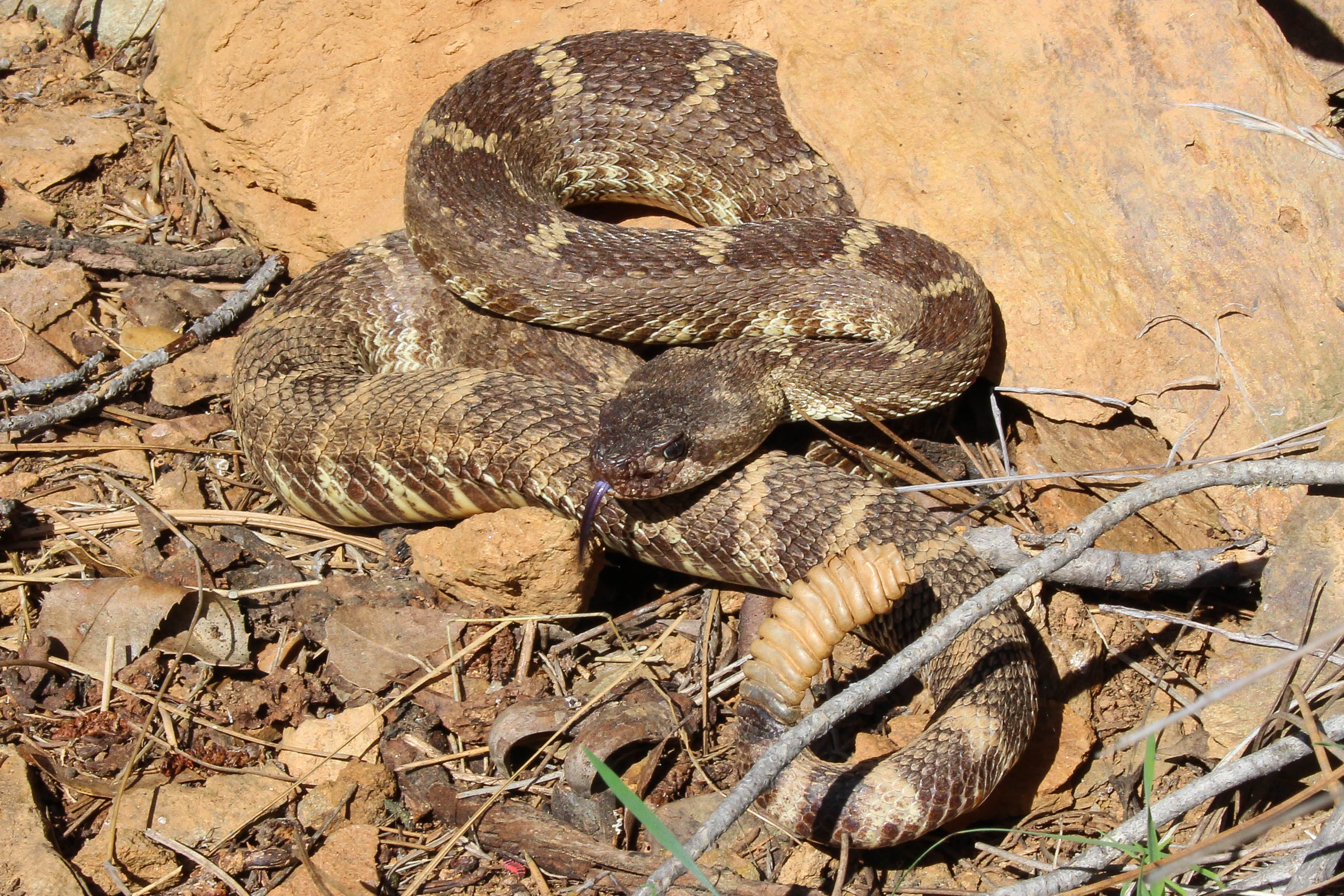
The California ground squirrel is resistant to the Northern Pacific rattlesnake's powerful venom.

Venom is used as a trophic weapon by many predator species. The coevolution between predators and prey is the driving force of venom resistance, which has evolved multiple times throughout the animal kingdom. The coevolution between venomous predators and venom-resistant prey has been described as a chemical arms race. Predator/prey pairs are expected to coevolve over long periods of time. As the predator capitalizes on susceptible individuals, the surviving individuals are limited to those able to evade predation. Resistance typically increases over time as the predator becomes increasingly unable to subdue resistant prey. The cost of developing venom resistance is high for both predator and prey. The payoff for the cost of physiological resistance is an increased chance of survival for prey, but it allows predators to expand into underutilised trophic niches.

The California ground squirrel has varying degrees of resistance to the venom of the Northern Pacific rattlesnake. The resistance involves toxin scavenging and depends on the population. Where rattlesnake populations are denser, squirrel resistance is higher. Rattlesnakes have responded locally by increasing the effectiveness of their venom.

The kingsnakes of the Americas are constrictors that prey on many venomous snakes. They have evolved resistance which does not vary with age or exposure. They are immune to the venom of snakes in their immediate environment, like copperheads, cottonmouths, and North American rattlesnakes, but not to the venom of, for example, king cobras or black mambas.

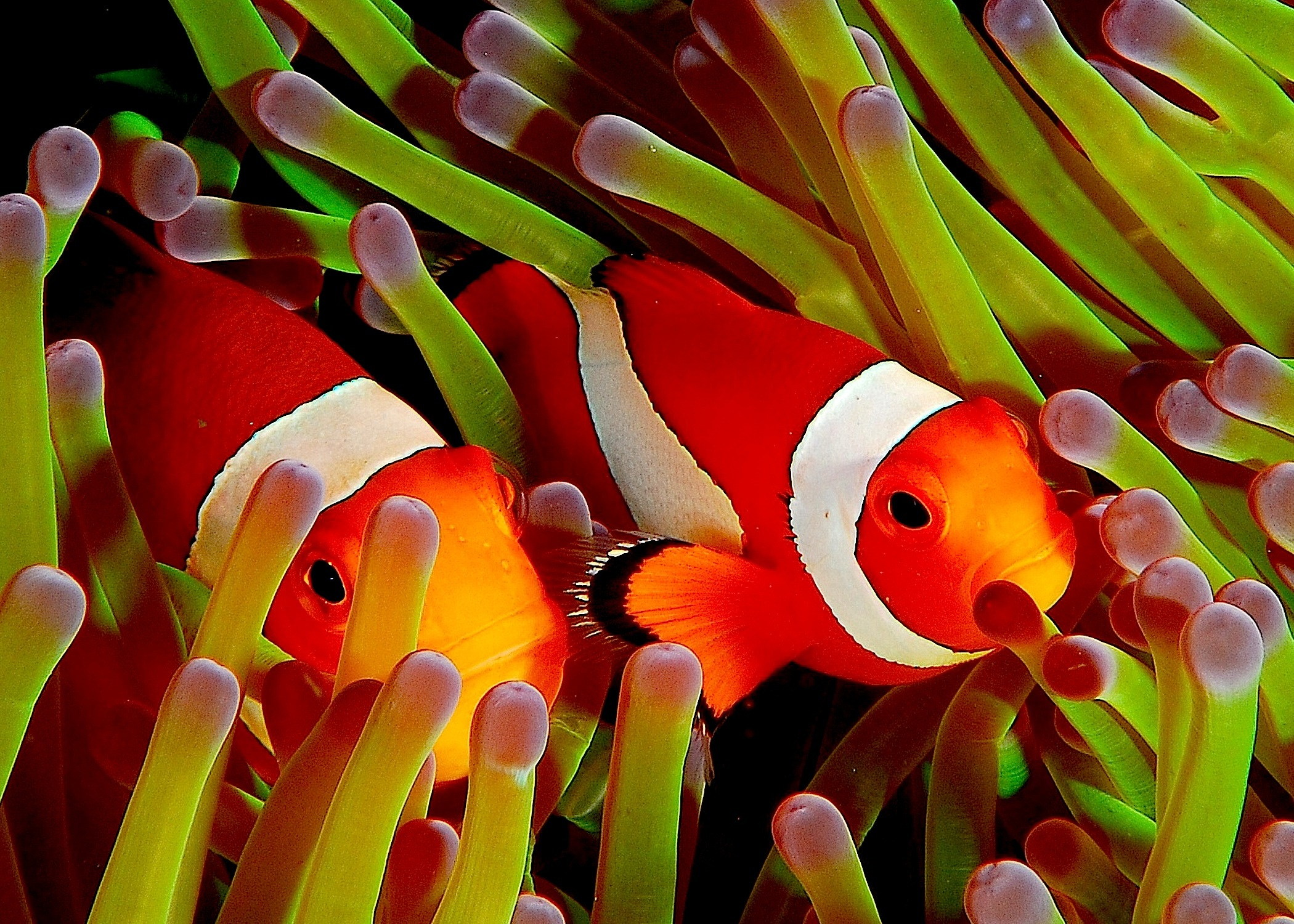
Ocellaris clownfish always live among venomous sea anemone tentacles and are resistant to the venom.

Among marine animals, eels are resistant to sea snake venoms, which contain complex mixtures of neurotoxins, myotoxins, and nephrotoxins, varying according to species. Eels are especially resistant to the venom of sea snakes that specialise in feeding on them, implying coevolution; non-prey fishes have little resistance to sea snake venom.

Clownfish always live among the tentacles of venomous sea anemones (an obligatory symbiosis for the fish), and are resistant to their venom. Only 10 known species of anemones are hosts to clownfish and only certain pairs of anemones and clownfish are compatible. All sea anemones produce venoms delivered through discharging nematocysts and mucous secretions. The toxins are composed of peptides and proteins. They are used to acquire prey and to deter predators by causing pain, loss of muscular coordination, and tissue damage. Clownfish have a protective mucus that acts as a chemical camouflage or macromolecular mimicry preventing "not self" recognition by the sea anemone and nematocyst discharge. Clownfish may acclimate their mucus to resemble that of a specific species of sea anemone.

== Non-animal venoms ==
Venoms in the sense of actively delivered toxins are not restricted to animals; all domains and kingdoms of life have evolved some version of a "venom".

- Bacteria have the relatively well-known secretion systems that can inject a payload (possibly a toxin) into another cell. Pseudomonas aeruginosa, for example, use a type VI secretion system to target competing microbes.
- The injection mechanism of bacteriophages is arguably similar to a venom.
- Stinging plants deliver toxins into targets. There are also more active mechanisms such as the haustorium of Cuscuta, injecting digestive enzymes to facilitate extration of nutrients.
- Phytopathogenic fungi use appressoria to penetrate target plants and deliver cell-killing toxins. Entomopathogenic fungi may also use appressoria to penetrate insects.
- Nematophagous fungi use many mechanisms to capture and penetrate the target nematode. They also produce toxins.
- Among protists, Coleps use specialized organelles called toxicysts to inject toxins into prey. Other protists may use extrusomes.

== See also ==
- Schmidt Sting Pain Index
