= Tyrannoroter =

Tyrannoroter Temporal range: Late Carboniferous (Pennsylvanian), late Moscovian–early Kasimovian

Scientific classification
- Kingdom: Animalia
- Phylum: Chordata
- Clade: Reptiliomorpha
- Clade: †Recumbirostra
- Family: †Pantylidae
- Genus: †Tyrannoroter; Mann et al., 2026
- Species: †T. heberti

Binomial name
- †Tyrannoroter heberti Mann et al., 2026

Genus of extinct tetrapod

Tyrannoroter (lit. 'tyrant digger') is an extinct genus of recumbirostran tetrapod in the family Pantylidae, known from the late Carboniferous Sydney Mines Formation of Canada. The genus contains a single species, Tyrannoroter heberti, known from a partial skull and mandible. The dentition indicates it had adaptations for herbivory.

== Discovery and naming ==
The Tyrannoroter fossil material was discovered inside the remains of a fossilized tree which was eroding out of a cliff face in Point Aconi, on the east shoreline of Cape Breton Island of Nova Scotia, Canada. These outcrops represent part of the Sydney Mines Formation (Morien Group). The specimen is housed in the Nova Scotia Museum, where it is permanently accessioned as specimen NSM 017GF020.002. The specimen comprises nearly all of the cranium, articulated with the mandible. The rear parts of the mandible, skull roof, and occiput are missing.

In 2026, Arjan Mann and colleagues described Tyrannoroter heberti as a new genus and species of early tetrapod in the family Pantylidae based on these fossil remains, establishing NSM 017GF020.002 as the holotype specimen. The generic name, Tyrannoroter, combines the Greek words tyrannos, meaning 'tyrant', and aroter, meaning 'ploughman' or 'digger'. This name was chosen in reference to the hypothesis that the downward-facing snout of the animal was used to rummage around on the ground. The specific name, heberti, honors B. L. Hebert, the discoverer of the holotype.

== Description ==
Speculative life restoration of the closely related Pantylus

Tyrannoroter is described as a large member of the family Pantylidae, similar in size and general morphology to Pantylus. The bones of the skull are closely sutured together, an indicator of skeletal maturity. The bones are also ornamented on their outer surfaces with rugosities and ridges, also a possible indicator of maturity. The maxilla (upper tooth-bearing bone) has a club-like shape and is downturned toward the front. The dentition of Tyrannoroter is particularly distinctive. The premaxillae likely held four enlarged teeth, followed by about 12 teeth in the maxilla. Two teeth at the front of the maxilla were enlarged, with a caniniform morphology. The teeth toward the rear are more bulbous, decreasing in size. The dentary (lower tooth-bearing bone) has at least 18 teeth, four of which near the front are similarly enlarged, protruding toward the sides of the mouth. The vomers, bones of the palate forming the roof of the mouth, are covered in many conical, broad-based teeth. These 'batteries' of teeth on the palate oppose comparable tooth batteries on the two coronoid bones of the mandible, which have a similar dental morphology, albeit with an additional, massive tooth at the rear of both posterior coronoids. These upper and lower tooth batteries occlude with each other, an adaptation for effectively processing tough plant material, such as stems and mature leaves.

== Classification ==
To test the relationships and affinities of Tyrannoroter, Mann and colleagues included it in an updated version of the phylogenetic dataset of Jenkins et al. (2025). Tyrannoroter was recovered as the sister taxon to Pantylus, together forming the family Pantylidae at the base of the larger, more diverse clade Recumbirostra. These results are displayed in the cladogram below:

- Tetrapoda
  - Temnospondyli
  - - Seymouria
    - - Solenodonsaurus
      - - - Limnoscelis
          - - Captorhinidae
            - - Protorothyris
              - Amniota
        - Recumbirostra
          - Pantylidae
            - Pantylus
            - Tyrannoroter
          - - - - Hapsidopareion
                - Odonterpetidae
              - Chthonosauria
                - Molgophidae
                - Brachystelechidae
            - Nastrondormes
              - - Huskerpeton
                - Proxilodon
              - - Gymnarthridae
                - - Rhynchonkidae
                  - Ostodolepididae
