= Venoms in medicine =

Venom in medicine is the medicinal use of venoms for therapeutic benefit in treating diseases.

Venom is any poisonous compound secreted by an animal intended to harm or disable another. When an organism produces a venom, its final form may contain hundreds of different bioactive elements that interact with each other inevitably producing its toxic effects. This mixture of ingredients includes various proteins, peptides, and non-peptidic small molecules. The active components of these venoms are isolated, purified, and screened in assays. These may be either phenotypic assays to identify component that may have desirable therapeutic properties (forward pharmacology) or target directed assays to identify their biological target and mechanism of action (reverse pharmacology).

== Background ==
Venoms are naturally occurring substances that organisms evolved to deploy against other organisms, in defense or attack. They are often mixtures of proteins that act together or singly to attack their specific targets within the organism against which they are used, generally with high specificity and generally easily accessible through the vascular system. This has made venoms a subject of study for people who work in drug discovery. With developments in omic technologies (proteomics, genomics, etc.), researchers in this field became able to identify genes that produce certain elements in an animal's venom, as well as protein domains that have been used as building blocks across many species. In conjunction with methods of separation and purification of compounds, scientists are able to study each individual compound that exists within a venom "concoction", looking for compounds to serve as drug leads or other use. Each venomous organism produces thousands of different proteins giving access to millions of different molecules that still have potential uses. In addition, nature is continuously evolving; as prey develop resistance to these venoms, the predators also evolve as well, creating novel toxins that can continue to act upon its respective prey.

== History ==
The earliest known use of venom in medicine dates back to 380 B.C. in ancient Greece. Aristotle's "Historia Animalium", describes how venom can be used in the production of antidotes for the venom. During the height of the Roman empire, there is evidence of venom being added into medicine used to treat smallpox, leprosy, fever, and wounds. Despite this, early uses of venom were primarily involved in the process of making antidotes. This use of venom continued into the Middle Ages and well into the 19th century. The first modern study of venom in a medical light occurred in the late 19th century. A scientist, Albert Calmatte, injected animals with small amounts of venom, using their blood as the antidote.

== Marketed drugs ==
=== Captopril ===
Captopril emulates the function of the toxin found in Brazilian pit viper (Bothrops jararaca) venom and is generally accepted as the first venom "success" story. Captopril is an ACE inhibitor (angiotensin-converting enzyme) that was approved by the FDA approved in April 1981. It lowers blood pressure by inhibiting the production of angiotensin II which acts in a pathway that leads to vasoconstriction which raises blood pressure. After the creation of this drug, many analogues (enalapril, lisinopril, perindopril, ramipril, etc.) were produced.

=== Ziconotide ===
Ziconotide is a synthetically made version of the ω-conotoxin made by the cone snail, that is used to treat severe pain and is delivered as an infusion into the cerebrospinal fluid using an intrathecal pump system. Ziconitide acts presynaptically on N-type calcium channels, blocking the receptors of this channel with high selectivity and affinity,

=== Eptifibatide ===
Eptifibatide was modeled after a component in southeastern pygmy rattlesnake venom and is used in anticoagulation therapies in an effort to reduce the risk of heart attacks; it is used in only severe cases because of the possible side effect of thrombocytopenia, a condition where platelets are unable to aggregate at all. Eptifibatide binds reversibly to platelets reducing the risk of thrombosis. It is an antagonist of glycoprotein IIb/IIIa.

=== Exenatide ===
Exenatide is a 39-amino-acid peptide that is a synthetic version of exendin-4, a hormone found in the saliva of the Gila monster. It is used to treat Type II Diabetes as an adjunct to insulin and other drugs. It is GLP-1 receptor agonist that was first isolated by John Eng in 1992 while working at the Veterans Administration Medical Center in the Bronx, New York.

=== Batroxobin ===
Batroxobin, is a serine protease found in snake venom produced by Bothrops atrox and Bothrops moojeni, venomous species of pit viper found east of the Andes in South America. It cleaves fibrinogen, similarly to thrombin. Batroxobin from B atrox is used as a drug called "Reptilase" that is used to stop bleeding, while batroxobin from B moojeni is a drug called "Defibrase", used to break up blood clots. It is also used in a system called "Vivostat", where a person's blood is taken just before surgery and exposed to batroxobin; the resulting clots are then harvested, and then dissolved, forming a fibrin glue that is then used on the person during the surgery.
