= Genitotoxin =

Poisonous toxin that damages the urinary organs or the reproductive organs

A genitotoxin is a poisonous toxin which damages the urinary organs or the reproductive organs. It can be due to negative side-effects of a medication, or may be caused by natural chemicals that are used in laboratories or the industry. The name derives from genus ("gender"), a word which suggests the aspects of andrology, gynaecology and urology.

The active effect of a genitotoxin is strongly dependent on the dose, the location of the intake, the speed at which it spreads and the health of the human or animal.

== Genitotoxic substances ==
- Zearalenone

== See also ==
- Mycotoxin
