= Trachystegos =

Scientific classification
- Kingdom: Animalia
- Phylum: Chordata
- Family: †Pantylidae
- Genus: †Trachystegos

Extinct genus of tetrapods

Trachystegos is an extinct genus of microsaur within the family Pantylidae.
