= Insect toxin =

Ptu family
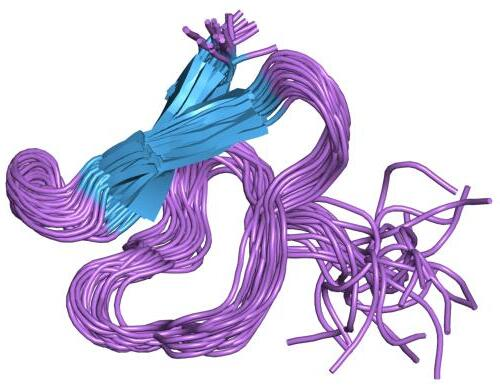
- Structure of ADO1, a toxin extracted from the saliva of the assassin bug, Agriosphodrus dohrni.

Identifiers
- Symbol: Toxin_30
- Pfam: PF08117
- InterPro: IPR012325
- PROSITE: PDOC60010
- OPM superfamily: 112
- OPM protein: 1lmr
Available protein structures:
- PDB: IPR012325 PF08117 (ECOD; PDBsum)
- AlphaFold: IPR012325; PF08117

Insect toxins are various protein toxins produced by insect species. Assassin bugs, sometimes known as kissing bugs, are one of the largest and morphologically diverse families of true bugs feeding on crickets, caterpillars and other insects. Some assassin bug species are bloodsucking parasites of mammals, even feed on humans. They can be commonly found throughout most of the world and their size varies from a few millimeters to as much as 3 or 4 centimeters. The toxic saliva of the predatory assassin bugs contains a complex mixture of small and large peptides for diverse uses such as immobilizing and pre-digesting their prey, as well as defense against competitors and predators. Assassin bug toxins are small peptides with disulfide connectivity that target ion channels. They are relatively homologous to the calcium channel blockers omega-conotoxins from marine cone snails and belong to the four-loop cysteine scaffold structural class.

One of these small proteins, Ptu1, blocks reversibly the N-type calcium channels, but at the same time is less specific for the L- or P/Q-type calcium channels. Ptu1 is 34 amino acid residues long and is cross-linked by 3 disulfide bridges. Ptu1 contains a beta-sheet region made of 2 antiparallel beta-strands and consists of a compact disulfide-bonded core from which four loops emerge as well as N- and C-termini. Some assassin bug toxins are listed below:

- Agriosphodrus dohrni toxin Ado1.
- Isyndus obscurus toxin Iob1.
- Peirates turpis toxin Ptu1.
