= Toxin =

Naturally occurring organic poison

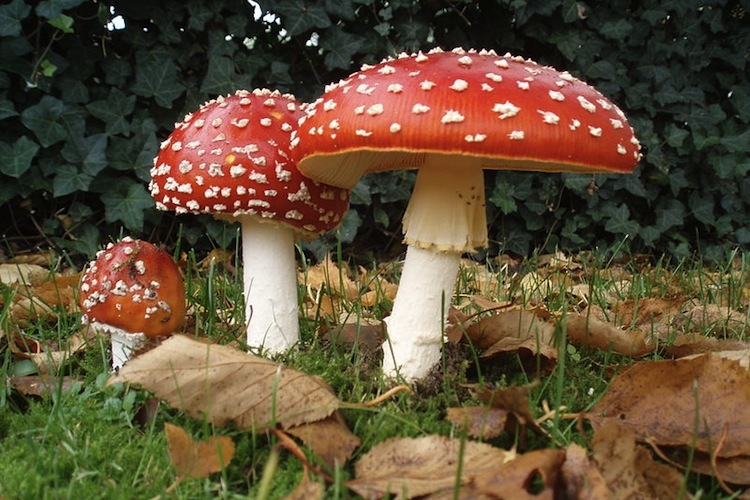
The Amanita muscaria mushroom, an iconic toxic mushroom.

A toxin is a naturally occurring poison produced by metabolic activities of living cells or organisms. They occur especially as proteins, often conjugated. The term was first used by organic chemist Ludwig Brieger (1849–1919), derived from toxic.

Toxins can be small molecules, peptides, or proteins that are capable of causing disease on contact with or absorption by body tissues interacting with biological macromolecules such as enzymes or cellular receptors. They vary greatly in their toxicity, ranging from usually minor (such as a bee sting) to potentially fatal even at extremely low doses (such as botulinum toxin).

== Terminology ==
Toxins are often distinguished from other chemical agents strictly based on their biological origin.

Less strict understandings embrace naturally occurring inorganic toxins, such as arsenic. Other understandings embrace synthetic analogs of naturally occurring organic poisons as toxins, and may or may not embrace naturally occurring inorganic poisons. It is important to confirm usage if a common understanding is critical.

Toxins are a subset of toxicants. The term toxicant is preferred when the poison is man-made and therefore artificial. The human and scientific genetic assembly of a natural-based toxin should be considered a toxin as it is identical to its natural counterpart. The debate is one of linguistic semantics.

The word toxin does not specify method of delivery (as opposed to venom, a toxin delivered via a bite, sting, etc.). Poison is a related but broader term that encompasses both toxins and toxicants; poisons may enter the body through any means - typically inhalation, ingestion, or skin absorption. Toxin, toxicant, and poison are often used interchangeably despite these subtle differences in definition. The term toxungen has also been proposed to refer to toxins that are delivered onto the body surface of another organism without an accompanying wound.

A rather informal terminology of individual toxins relates them to the anatomical location where their effects are most notable:

- Genitotoxin, damages the urinary organs or the reproductive organs
- Hemotoxin, causes destruction of red blood cells (hemolysis)
- Phototoxin, causes dangerous photosensitivity
- Hepatotoxins affect the liver
- Neurotoxins affect the nervous system

On a broader scale, toxins may be classified as either exotoxins, excreted by an organism, or endotoxins, which are released mainly when bacteria are lysed.

== Biological ==
The term "biotoxin" is sometimes used to explicitly confirm the biological origin as opposed to environmental or anthropogenic origins. Biotoxins can be classified by their mechanism of delivery as poisons (passively transferred via ingestion, inhalation, or absorption across the skin), toxungens (actively transferred to the target's surface by spitting, spraying, or smearing), or venoms (delivered through a wound generated by a bite, sting, or other such action). They can also be classified by their source, such as fungal biotoxins, microbial toxins, plant biotoxins, or animal biotoxins.

Toxins produced by microorganisms are important virulence determinants responsible for microbial pathogenicity and/or evasion of the host immune response.

Biotoxins vary greatly in purpose and mechanism, and can be highly complex (the venom of the cone snail can contain over 100 unique peptides, which target specific nerve channels or receptors).

Biotoxins in nature have two primary functions:

- Predation, such as in the spider, snake, scorpion, jellyfish, and wasp
- Defense as in the bee, ant, termite, honey bee, wasp, poison dart frog and plants producing toxins
  - The toxins used as defense in species among the poison dart frog can also be used for medicinal purposes

Some of the more well known types of biotoxins include:

- Cyanotoxins, produced by cyanobacteria
- Dinotoxins, produced by dinoflagellates
- Necrotoxins cause necrosis (i.e., death) in the cells they encounter. Necrotoxins spread through the bloodstream. In humans, skin and muscle tissues are most sensitive to necrotoxins. Organisms that possess necrotoxins include:
  - The brown recluse or "fiddle back" spider
  - Most rattlesnakes and vipers produce phospholipase and various trypsin-like serine proteases
  - Puff adder
  - Necrotizing fasciitis (caused by the "flesh eating" bacterium Streptococcus pyogenes) – produces a pore forming toxin
- Neurotoxins primarily affect the nervous systems of animals. The group neurotoxins generally consists of ion channel toxins that disrupt ion channel conductance. Organisms that possess neurotoxins include:
  - The black widow spider.
  - Most scorpions
  - The box jellyfish
  - Elapid snakes
  - The cone snail
  - The Blue-ringed octopus
  - Venomous fish
  - Frogs
  - Palythoa coral
  - Various different types of algae, cyanobacteria and dinoflagellates
- Myotoxins are small, basic peptides found in snake and lizard venoms, They cause muscle tissue damage by a non-enzymatic receptor based mechanism. Organisms that possess myotoxins include:
  - rattlesnakes
  - Mexican beaded lizard
- Cytotoxins are toxic at the level of individual cells, either in a non-specific fashion or only in certain types of living cells:
  - Ricin, from castor beans
  - Apitoxin, from honey bees
  - T-2 mycotoxin, from certain toxic mushrooms
  - Cardiotoxin III, from Chinese cobra
  - Hemotoxin, from vipers

=== Weaponry ===
Many living organisms employ toxins offensively or defensively. A relatively small number of toxins are known to have the potential to cause widespread sickness or casualties. They are often inexpensive and easily available, and in some cases it is possible to refine them outside the laboratory. As biotoxins act quickly, and are highly toxic even at low doses, they can be more efficient than chemical agents. Due to these factors, it is vital to raise awareness of the clinical symptoms of biotoxin poisoning, and to develop effective countermeasures including rapid investigation, response, and treatment.

== Environmental ==
The term "environmental toxin" can sometimes explicitly include synthetic contaminants such as industrial pollutants and other artificially made toxic substances. As this contradicts most formal definitions of the term "toxin", it is important to confirm what the researcher means when encountering the term outside of microbiological contexts.

Environmental toxins from food chains that may be dangerous to human health include:

- Paralytic shellfish poisoning (PSP)
- Amnesic shellfish poisoning (ASP)
- Diarrheal shellfish poisoning (DSP)
- Neurotoxic shellfish poisoning (NSP)

== Research ==
In general, when scientists determine the amount of a substance that may be hazardous for humans, animals and/or the environment they determine the amount of the substance likely to trigger effects and if possible establish a safe level. In Europe, the European Food Safety Authority produced risk assessments for more than 4,000 substances in over 1,600 scientific opinions and they provide open access summaries of human health, animal health and ecological hazard assessments in their OpenFoodTox database. The OpenFoodTox database can be used to screen potential new foods for toxicity.

The Toxicology and Environmental Health Information Program (TEHIP) at the United States National Library of Medicine (NLM) maintains a comprehensive toxicology and environmental health web site that includes access to toxins-related resources produced by TEHIP and by other government agencies and organizations. This web site includes links to databases, bibliographies, tutorials, and other scientific and consumer-oriented resources. TEHIP also is responsible for the Toxicology Data Network (TOXNET), an integrated system of toxicology and environmental health databases that are available free of charge on the web.

TOXMAP is a Geographic Information System (GIS) that is part of TOXNET. TOXMAP uses maps of the United States to help users visually explore data from the United States Environmental Protection Agency's (EPA) Toxics Release Inventory and Superfund Basic Research Programs.

== See also ==
- ArachnoServer
- Brevetoxin
- Cangitoxin
- Detoxification (alternative medicine)
- Dose–response relationship
- Excitotoxicity
- Environment and health
- Exposome
- Insect toxin
- List of highly toxic gases
- List of poisonous plants
- Pollution
- Secondary metabolite
- Toxalbumin
- Toxicophore, feature or group within a molecule that is thought to be responsible for its toxic properties.
- Toxin-antitoxin system
