= Ptu1 =

Toxin

Ptu1 is a toxin that can reversibly bind N-type calcium channels. It is isolated from the assassin bug Peirates turpis. The toxin belongs to the inhibitory cystine knot structural family (ICK) that has a core of disulfide bonds with four loops emerging from it.

== Etymology and source ==
Ptu1 is named after the bug Peirates turpis, where it is found. The peptide is found in its saliva.

== Chemistry and targets ==
Ptu1 is a relatively short peptide of around 3.6 kDa. Its structure belongs to the inhibitory cystine knot family. This is a structural motif that contains at least three disulfide bridges, from which several loops may emerge. The knot is formed by having one disulfide bridge cross the other two disulfide bridges. Disulfide bridges are made by forming a cysteine dimer, called cystine. Due to this, it has a high disulfide content, making ICK motifs highly stable. In line with this, Ptu1 consists of a core of compact disulfide bonds. From this core a total of four loops emerge, along with its C- and N-termini

The structure of Ptu1 is slightly homologous with the ω-conotoxins.: Geographus Venom IA (GVIA) and Mollusc Venom IIA (MVIIA). They both share the inhibitor cystine knot motif. Their structure is 17% and 23% homologous, respectively

Besides the ICK motif, the toxin contains a β-sheet made of two β-strands in an antiparallel orientation. The molecule may exist in two conformations, between which it rapidly switches

Ptu1 binds reversibly to voltage gated N-type calcium channels.

== Mode of action ==
Ptu1 reversibly blocks N-type calcium channels. In addition, it has a low affinity for L or P/Q-type channels.

The mechanism by which Ptu1 blocks N-type voltage dependent calcium channels is unknown. Since it has a structural similarity to the ω-conotoxins, it is possible that their blocking mechanism is similar. MVIIA is a pore-blocking toxin. There are two key differences between the functionality of MVIIA and Ptu1. First, the binding of MVIIA is irreversible, whereas the binding of Ptu1 is reversible. Second, Ptu1 has a relatively low binding affinity for N-type calcium channels compared to MVIIA. A possible explanation for this difference is the presence of an aspartic acid residue in the second loop of Ptu1

== Toxicity ==
The toxicity of Ptu1 was tested by direct injection into the body of goldfish, mice, cutworm larvae, and crickets. The assassin bug peptide showed no toxic symptoms in any of the tested vertebrates and invertebrates.
