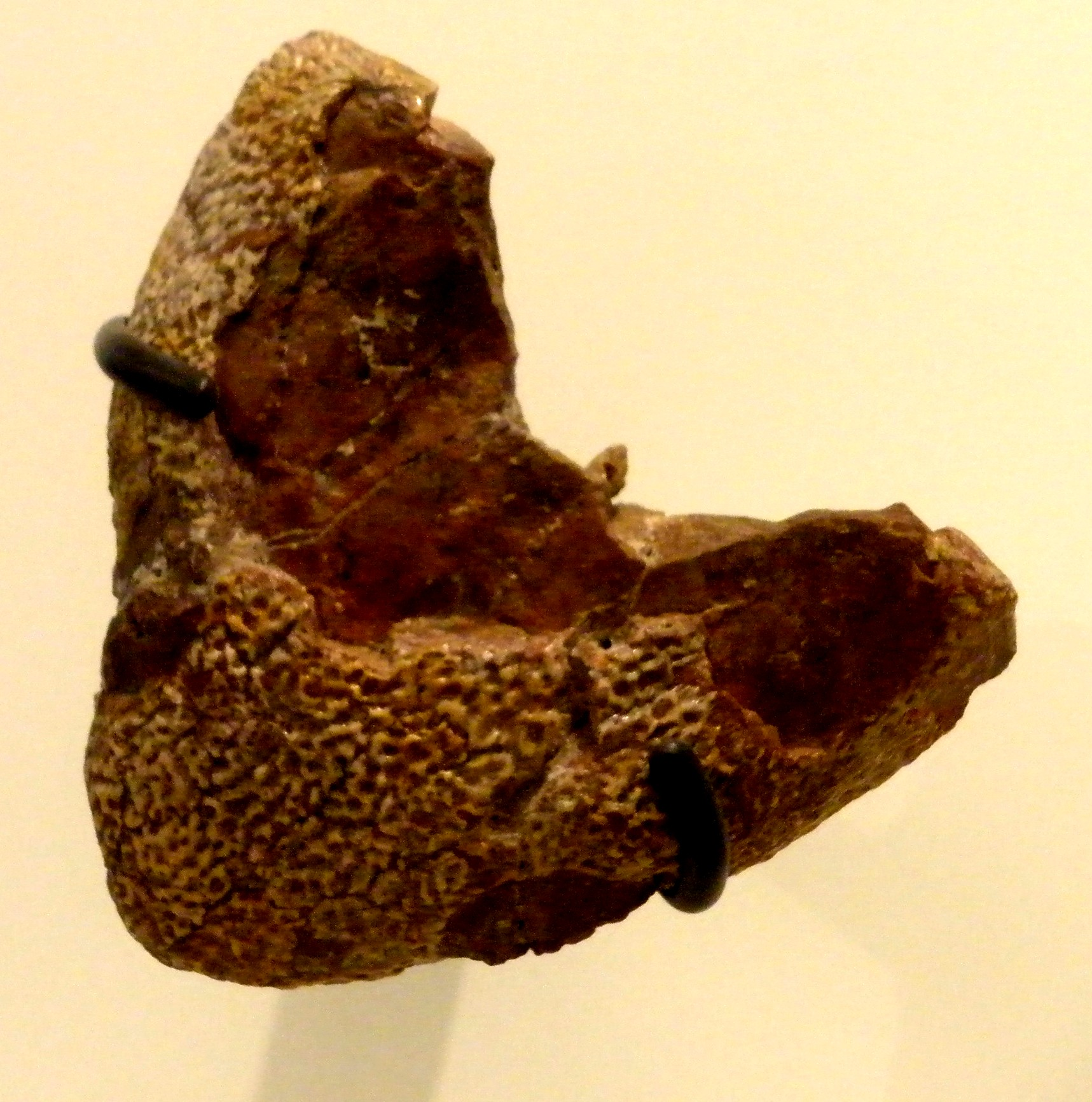
- Pantylus cordatus skull fossil

Scientific classification
- Kingdom: Animalia
- Phylum: Chordata
- Clade: †Recumbirostra
- Family: †Pantylidae; Case, 1911

Genera
- †Pantylus; †Sparodus?; †Stegotretus; †Trachystegos; †Tyrannoroter

= Pantylidae =

Pantylidae Temporal range: Lower Permian

Extinct family of tetrapods

Pantylidae is an extinct family of tetrapods of the group Recumbirostra. It also often considered a sister-group to the family Tuditanidae. The family contains two genera Pantylus and Stegotretus, while a third, Sparodus, is sometimes placed here as well.
