= Toxungen =

Class of biological toxins distinct from venoms and poisons

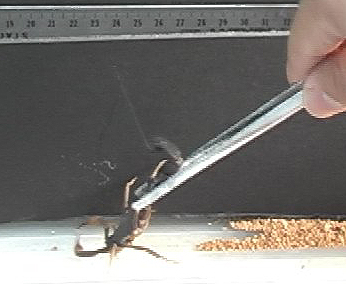
Experimentally induced toxungen spraying by the scorpion Parabuthus transvaalicus.

A toxungen comprises a secretion or other bodily fluid containing one or more biological toxins that is transferred by one animal to the external surface of another animal via a physical delivery mechanism with or without direct contact between the secreting animal and the victim. Toxungens can be delivered through spitting, spraying, or smearing. As one of three categories of biological toxins, toxungens can be distinguished from poisons, which are passively transferred via ingestion, inhalation, or absorption across the skin, and venoms, which are delivered through a wound generated by direct contact in the form of a bite, sting, or other such action. Toxungen use offers the evolutionary advantage of delivering toxins into the target's tissues without the need for physical contact. Animals that deploy toxungens are referred to as toxungenous.

== Taxonomic distribution ==
Toxungens have evolved in a variety of animals, including flatworms, insects, arachnids, cephalopods, amphibians, and reptiles.

Toxungen use possibly also exists in birds, as a number of species deploy defensive secretions from their stomachs, uropygial glands, or cloacas, and some anoint themselves with heterogenously acquired chemicals from millipedes, caterpillars, beetles, plant materials, and even manufactured pesticides. Some of the described substances may be toxic, at least to ectoparasites, which would qualify them as toxungens.

Toxungen use might also exist in several mammal groups. Slow lorises (genus Nycticebus), which comprise several species of nocturnal primates in Southeast Asia, produce a secretion in their brachial glands (a scent gland near their armpit) that possesses apparent toxicity. When the secretion is licked and combined with saliva, their bite introduces the secretion into a wound, which can cause sometimes severe tissue injury to conspecifics and other aggressors, thereby functioning as a venom. They can also rub the secretion on their fur or lick their offspring before stashing them in a secure location, thereby functioning potentially as a toxungen. Skunks and several other members of Mephitidae and Mustelidae spray a noxious and potentially injurious secretion from their anal sac when threatened. High concentrations of the spray can be toxic, with rare accounts of spray victims suffering injury and even death.

Although the extinct theropod Dilophosaurus was portrayed in the original Jurassic Park and Jurassic World Dominion films as capable of spitting a toxic secretion, no evidence exists to suggest that any dinosaur possessed either a toxungen or venom.

== Classification of toxin deployment ==
Some animals use their toxins in multiple ways, and can be classified as poisonous, toxungenous, and/or venomous. Examples include the scorpion Parabuthus transvaalicus, which is both toxungenous (can spray its toxins) and venomous (can inject its toxins), and the snake Rhabdophis tigrinus, which is poisonous (sequesters toad and/or firefly toxins in its nuchal gland tissues that are toxic if consumed by a predator), toxungenous (the nuchal glands are pressurized and can spray the toxins when ruptured), and venomous (toxic oral gland secretions can be injected via the teeth). Even humans can be considered facultatively poisonous, toxungenous, and venomous because they sometimes make use of toxins by all three means for research and development (e.g., biomedical purposes), agriculture (e.g., spraying insecticides), and nefarious reasons (to kill other animals, including humans).

== Evolution and function ==
Toxungen deployment offers a key evolutionary advantage compared to poisons and venoms. Poisons and venoms require direct contact with the target animal, which puts the toxin-possessing animal at risk of injury and death from a potentially dangerous enemy. Evolving the capacity to spit or spray a toxic secretion can reduce this risk by delivering the toxins from a distance.

Toxins used as toxungens can be acquired by several means. Many species synthesize their own toxins and store them within glands, but others acquire their toxins exogenously from other species. Two examples illustrate exogenous acquisition. Snakes of the genus Rhabdophis sequester their nuchal gland toxins from their diet of toads and/or fireflies, Blue-ringed octopuses (genus Hapalochlaeana) acquire tetrodotoxin, the highly toxic non-proteinaceous component of their salivary glands that can be ejected into the water to subdue nearby prey, via accumulation from food resources and/or symbiotic tetrodotoxin-producing bacteria.

Toxungens are most commonly used for defensive purposes, but can be used in other contexts as well. Examples of toxungen use for predation include the blue-ringed octopus, which can squirt its secretion into water to immobilize or kill its prey, and ants of the genus Crematogaster that cooperatively subdue their prey by seizing, spread-eagling, and then smearing their toxins onto the prey's surface. Toxungens can also be used for communication and hygiene. Many hymenopterans possess a secretion used as a venom (injected for predation and/or defense) that can also be sprayed to communicate alarm among nestmates, to mark a trail used for food gathering, or to keep their brood free of parasites.

Because of their unique delivery system, toxungens may be chemically designed to better penetrate body surfaces. Arthropods that spray or smear their secretion onto insect prey enhance toxin penetration by including a spreading agent that additionally enhances toxicity. Some Spitting cobras have modified their secretion so that the cardiotoxins are more injurious to eye membranes.
