= Parischnogaster striatula =

Scientific classification
- Domain: Eukaryota
- Kingdom: Animalia
- Phylum: Arthropoda
- Class: Insecta
- Order: Hymenoptera
- Family: Vespidae
- Genus: Parischnogaster
- Species: P. striatula

Binomial name
- Parischnogaster striatula (R. du Buysson, 1905)

Species of wasp

Parischnogaster striatula is a species of social hover wasps found in Southeast Asia. Their nests are uniquely shaped, mimic their surroundings and, like the other Stenogastrinae social wasps, lack a nest pedicel. They are also unique in their use of glandular secretion when laying eggs. P. striatula is also different than typical wasps because the queens are not the only ones who possess reproductive capabilities; other females also have developed ovaries. This wasp is also known for fiercely protecting its nest against enemies, such as ants or other hornets.

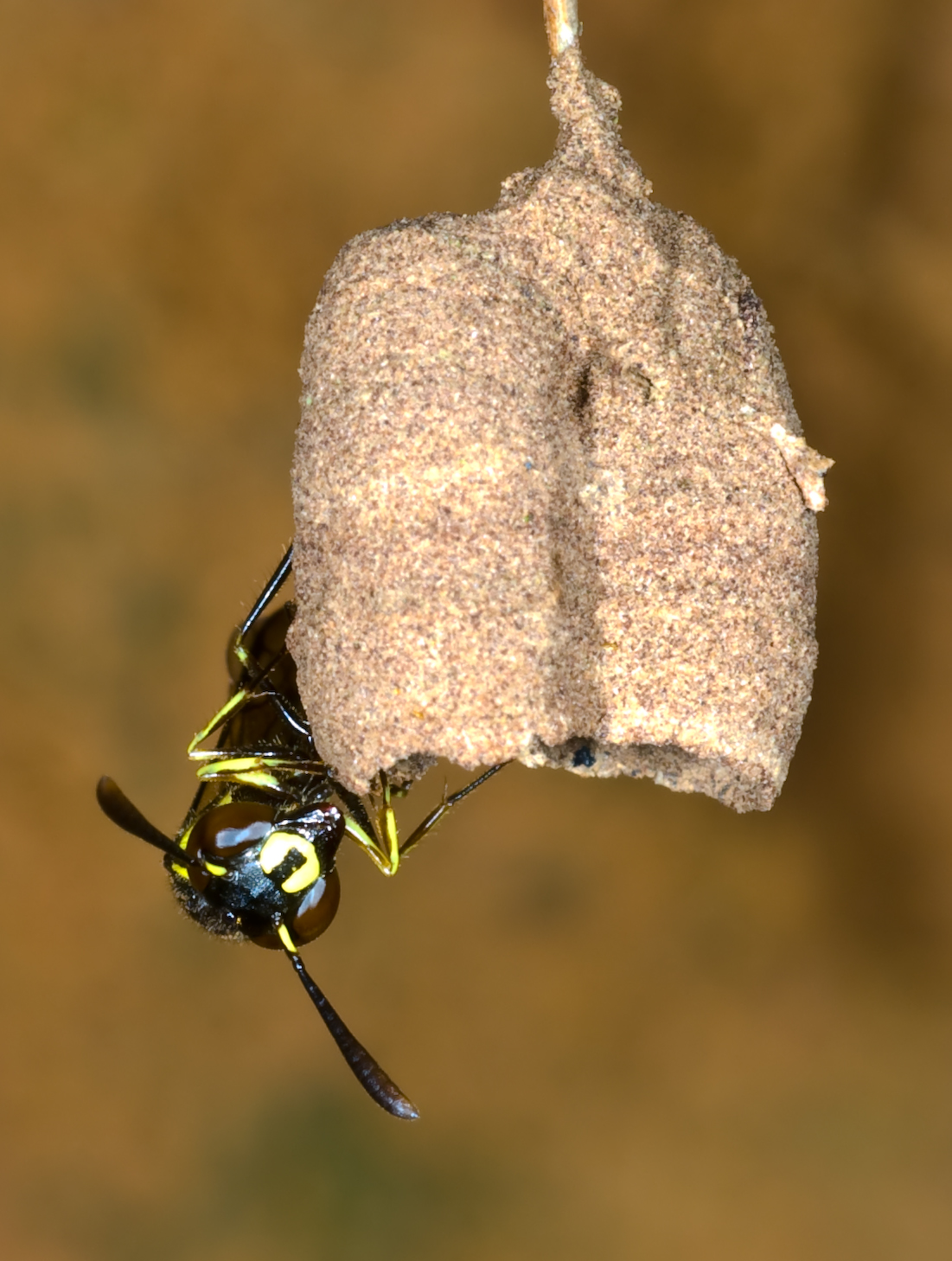
Parischnogaster striatula

== Taxonomy and phylogeny ==
P. striatula is under the subfamily Stenogastrinae, sometimes known as hover wasps. While the Stenogastrinae taxonomy and phylogeny are still under study, it is known that Parischnogaster species are split into two subcategories, with P. striatula being closely related to P. alternata. Together, these two species make up the striatula group.

== Description and identification ==
=== Morphology ===
P. striatula has black pigmentation on its clypeus, with black inner and outer eye stripes, and mandibles. The adults are recognizable by their distinctive hovering flight.

=== Nests ===
Their nests lack a nest pedicel, and implant on thread-like suspensions such as rootlets, thin stems and artificial wires. They consist of cells spirally arranged around a central tube, and are constructed from mud, mud mixed with chewed vegetable material, or paper. P. striatula colonies do not contain many individuals, therefore the nests are small in size.

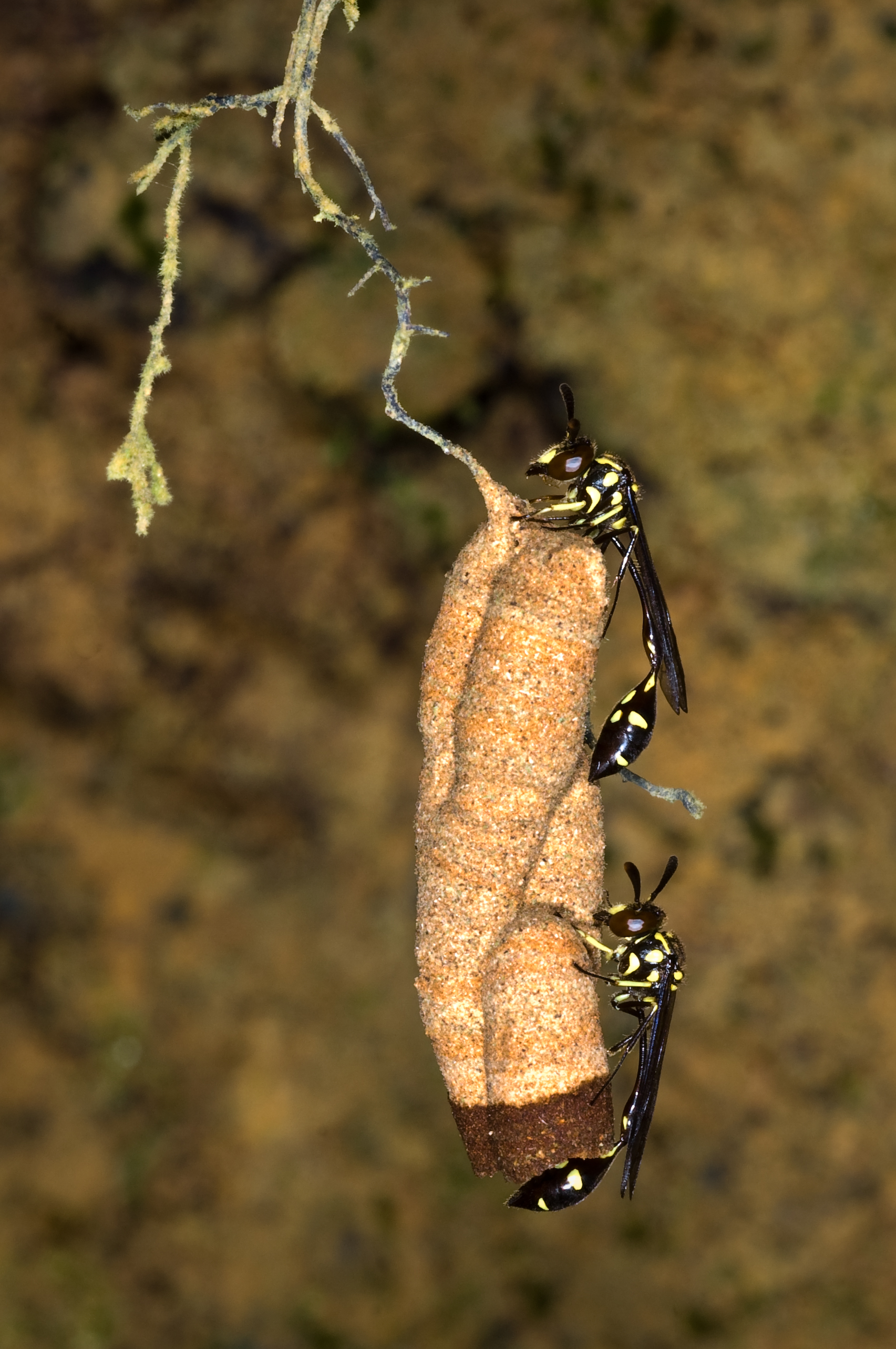
Two females of Parischnogaster striatula resting on their nest hanged on a small root

== Distribution and habitat ==
P. striatula is a commonly found species in Southeast Asia, specifically the Indo-Malaysian area. Their unique nests are found in areas sheltered from rain, including along forest roads or trails, under the vaults of caves, and human buildings such as a gazebo. While it is possible to find some nests close together, they do not form aggregations.

== Colony cycle ==
The colonies are typically small; most do not exceed a dozen individuals. Each colony will not exceed five females. There are two distinct times of major activity, one in the morning and one in the afternoon. Social interactions are more frequent during the middle of the day, between off-nest activity peaks, when many females return to the nest.

== Behavior ==
=== Hierarchy ===
The colony consists of one dominant female, one or two other non-dominant females, and males. The dominant females are usually located at the top of the nest, with the non-dominant females in the middle, and males at the lower part of the nest near the entrance. There is no visual status badge among the females; females with developed ovaries look identical to females with underdeveloped ovaries. What separates the dominant females from the non-dominant females is the size of their ovaries. The female P. striatula with the largest ovaries becomes the dominant female of the colony.

=== Roles ===
The dominant females are the ones that lay eggs and stay on the nest for the longest periods of times. The non-dominant females are usually the ones to construct the nest. They also forage for food and mud, which they use to build the nest. The females are also very attentive to wasps approaching their nest, which they greet with either antennations and/or bites. However, sometimes the roles can be temporary. Newly emerged females will most likely become workers by helping out with the nest before leaving to find or acquire their own colony.

== Brood rearing ==
Although there is a dominant female, she is not the only one in the nest with developed ovaries. However, due to the low number eggs and the number of empty cells, it is believed that only one female lays the eggs. In order for successful brood breeding, additional female help is needed, which explains why some newly hatched females will take on the role of workers to benefit the entire colony. The number of larvae is proportional to the number of females and males in the nest. The more female and male workers there are, the more eggs that can be laid. The larvae have a long developmental time with four larval instars.

=== Use of abdominal substance ===
When laying eggs, P. striatula secretes a sticky abdominal substance, created by its Dufour’s gland, and collects it in her mouth. Then as the eggs emerge from her abdomen, she uses this abdominal substance to handle them and proceeds to stick them into an empty cell. Next, to secure her eggs, the female will once again gather more abdominal substance in her mouth and place it over the eggs. Sometimes, the female wasp that laid the eggs, will keep them uncovered and the worker females will finish the job with their own secretion. There have been cases where the female was interrupted during this process, and was seen abandoning the nest with the eggs still in her mouth. Once the threat passed, the female was able to return to place them in the empty cell. Individuals in the colony are not able to discriminate between eggs covered by their nestmates.

== Mimicry ==
P. striatula nests are small, well hidden, and highly mimetic. They have a highly varied nest architecture that is effective in camouflage. The P. striatula is able to alter their nest’s outside texture to best fit in with their surroundings. The nest can be smooth to match buildings, or rough to watch the surrounding woods and trees. They gather various materials to garnish the exterior of the nest with decorations to give it a rough texture.

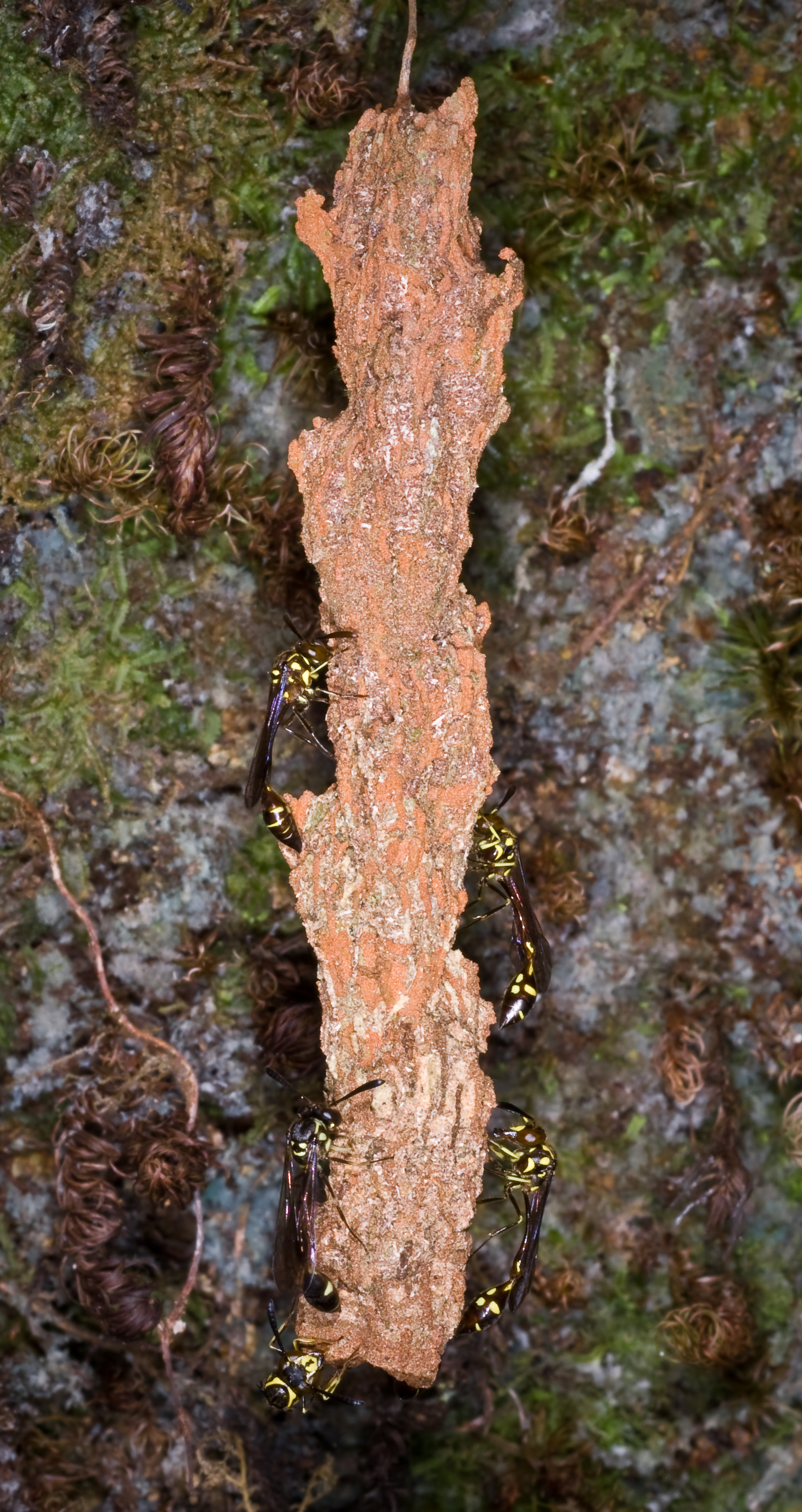
Old ough nest of Parischnogaster striatula.

== Interaction with other species ==
=== Defense ===
One main defensive strategy is their use of mimicry when building their nests. By blending into their surroundings, P. striatula is more likely to avoid confrontation with their predators. However, this strategy is not always successful. Their two main predators are hornets and ants. The females of the nest change their defensive strategy based on who is attacking them. When it comes to ants, the females are fiercely aggressive; they reject and bite the invaders. For hornets, they put on a threatening bending posture of the abdomen. A more useful strategy against hornets is the use of dropping flights.

== Nestmate recognition ==
P. striatula distinguishes between an alien or nestmate approaching their nest by the incoming flight pattern. If the wasp is their nestmate, it will most likely be flying directly towards the nest, while alien P. striatula will hover around the nest before it lands. To differentiate their nestmates, they depend on chemical cues which in their case, are epicuticular lipids. Epicuticular lipid profiles are more similar among nestmates than compared to alien lipid profiles.

== Protection against disease ==
Although P. striatula colonies are small, they still live in close quarters which can lead to the a rapid spread of disease throughout the nest. In order to protect themselves, P. striatula use their venom, which has strong antimicrobial peptides. By applying their own venom on themselves, they essentially make themselves immune to certain harmful diseases. To apply the venom, they self-groom with little drops of venom collected with their legs, thus applying it all over their body.
