= Phototoxin =

Toxins that interact with light

Phototoxins are substances that become toxic or more toxic in the presence of light, especially ultraviolet (UV) radiation. They can cause skin reactions like redness, swelling, and burning sensations, and can be harmful to living organisms by generating reactive oxygen species and other free radicals.

Phototoxins are common in:

- a variety of plants (including food plants where they may be a biological defence):
  - many citruses contain essential oils that are photosensitizers;
  - some herbal remedies (notably St John's wort, though incident rates for this plant are reportedly low);
  - the carrot family of Apiaceae;
- some prescribed medications (such as tetracycline antibiotics); and
- many essential oils, perfumes and cosmetics.

Ingested medications may cause systemic photosensitivity and topically applied medications, cosmetics and essential oils may lead to local (or perhaps systemic) photosensitivity. Para-aminobenzoic acid (PABA), found in some sunscreens, can also cause photosensitivity.

Upon exposure to light, notably light containing ultraviolet radiation, discolouration of the skin (whether as inflammation, lightening or darkening) or rashes may result. In extreme cases, blistering may also occur.

== Uses ==
The marigold plant produces the phototoxin alpha-terthienyl, which functions as a nematicide. When exposed to near ultraviolet light, such as in sunlight, alpha-terthienyl generates the toxic singlet oxygen. Alpha-terthienyl results in damage to the respiratory, digestive and nervous system of larvae, resulting in 100% death rates in concentrations of 33 ppb. This makes it an interesting natural insecticide.

Rose bengal and other singlet oxygen generating phototoxins are also used in synthetic organic chemistry. They have also found use in photodynamic therapy, where the toxin is activated by intense light to destroy cancer cells.

== See also ==
- Photodermatitis
- Photosensitivity in animals
- Photoallergy
