= Infernovenator =

Infernovenator Temporal range: Carboniferous, 309–307 Ma

Scientific classification
- Domain: Eukaryota
- Kingdom: Animalia
- Phylum: Chordata
- Order: †Lysorophia
- Family: †Molgophidae
- Genus: †Infernovenator

Type species
- Infernovenator steenae Mann, Pardo, & Maddin, 2019

Extinct genus of amphibians

Infernovenator is a genus of Carboniferous lysorophian recumbirostran from the Mazon Creek lagerstätte in Illinois, U.S. It was described in 2019.

== History of study ==
The holotype, now reposited at the Field Museum, was previously described by Godfrey (1997) as an aïstopod, Phlegethontia longissama. Redescription of the specimen led to its identification as a new lysorophian taxon. Infernovenator is represented only by the holotype, a nearly complete skeleton. The genus name is given for the Latin infernum ("hell") to refer to the fossorial habitats of the taxon and venator ("hunter"). The species name honors paleontologist Margaret Clair Steen Brough.

== Anatomy ==
Infernovenator is diagnosed by a unique combination of features: (1) 61 presacral vertebrae; (2) a triangular postfrontal that contacts the tabular; (3) a circumorbital series formed by the prefrontal, the postfrontal, the lacrimal, and the maxilla; and (4) an ossified septomaxilla. Features shared with the lysorophian Brachydectes and not with other recumbirostrans include: (1) postorbital absent and cheek emargination present; (2) bar-like tabular-squamosal complex; and (3) short and robust dentary.

== Taxonomy ==
Below is the strict consensus topology recovered from the maximum parsimony analysis of Mann et al. (2019):

- - Seymouria
  - - Limnoscelis
    - Amniota
      - - Ophiacodon
        - Dimetrodon
      - - - Petrolacosaurus
          - Captorhinus
        - - Opisthodontosaurus
          - Recumbirostra
            - - Nannaroter
              - - Micraroter
                - Pelodosotis
            - - - Huskerpeton
                - Cardiocephalus
              - - Rhynchonkos
                - - Aletrimyti
                  - Dvellecanus
              - - - Molgophidae
                    - Brachydectes
                    - Infernovenator
                  - - Quasicaecilia
                    - - Batropetes
                      - Carrolla
