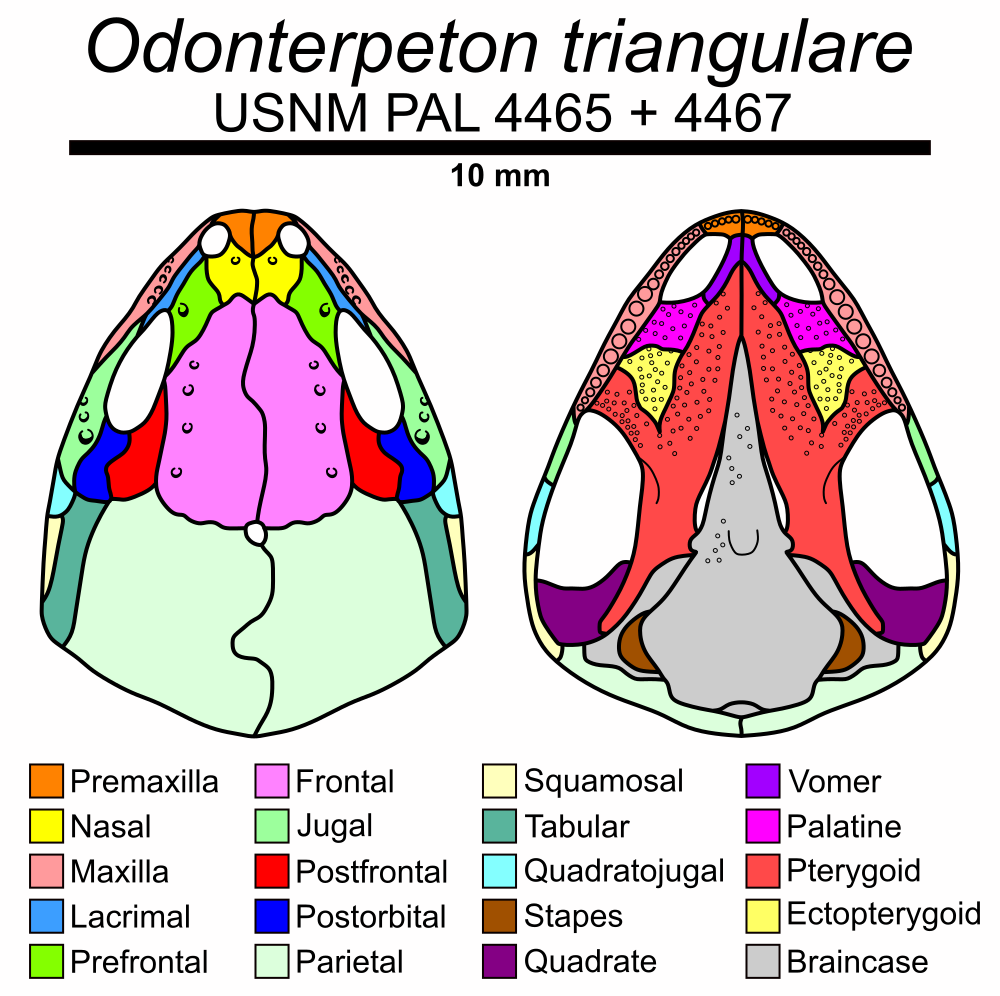
- Skull diagram in dorsal view (left) and ventral view (right)

Scientific classification
- Kingdom: Animalia
- Phylum: Chordata
- Family: †Odonterpetidae
- Genus: †Odonterpeton; Moodie, 1909
- Species: †O. triangulare

Binomial name
- †Odonterpeton triangulare Moodie, 1909

= Odonterpeton =

Odonterpeton Temporal range: Moscovian (Westphalian D)

Extinct genus of tetrapods

Odonterpeton is an extinct genus of "microsaur" (small reptiles or reptile-like amphibians) from the Late Carboniferous of Ohio, containing the lone species Odonterpeton triangulare. It is known from a single partial skeleton preserving the skull, forelimbs, and the front part of the torso. The specimen was found in the abandoned Diamond Coal Mine of Linton, Ohio, a fossiliferous coal deposit dated to the late Moscovian stage (Westphalian D), about 310 million years ago.

Odonterpeton was very small even among microsaurs, and its skeletal anatomy has been compared to aquatic salamanders such as amphiuma. Its habitat was a tropical river and delta environment bustling with fish, amphibians, and rare early reptiles. The three-fingered forelimbs are tiny, and hindlimb evidence is unclear. Odonterpeton is the sister taxon to Joermungandr bolti (a scaly four-limbed microsaur from the Mazon Creek fossil beds of Illinois), and together they make up the family Odonterpetidae.

== Description ==
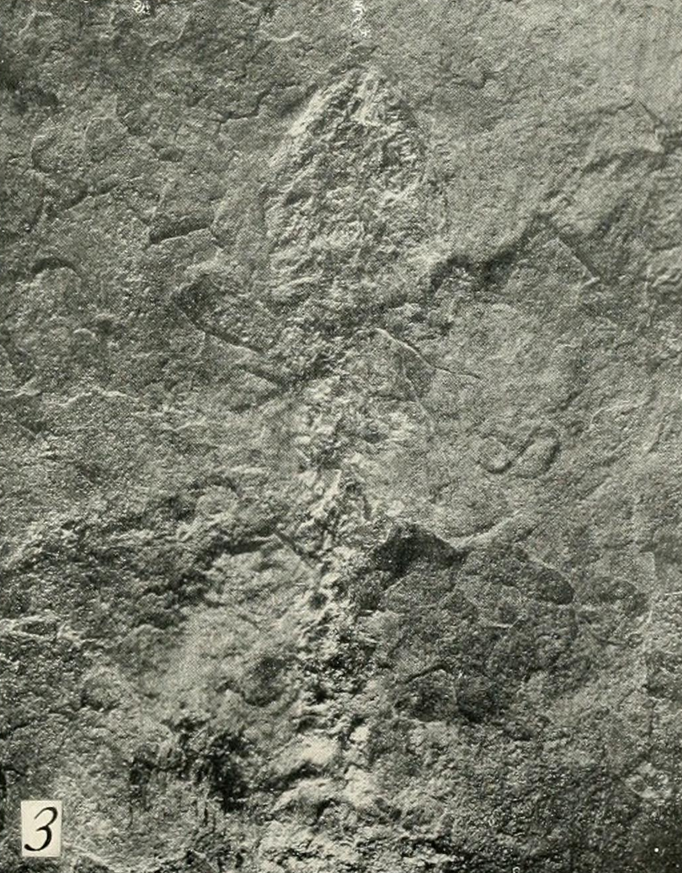
Holotype fossil as photographed by Moodie (1909)

Odonterpeton is one of the smallest known microsaurs, with a skull length of only 6.6 millimeters (0.26 inches). The skull is rounded and semi-triangular when seen from above, hence the species name. The snout is short, with moderately large orbits (eye sockets) which are shifted forwards and widely-spaced, facing sideways. The nasal bones (at the top of the snout) are notably small, while the parietal bones (at the back of the skull) are very large. Some older sources reported that Odonterpeton had a large singular postparietal bone at the rear apex of the skull. Later investigations consider this to have been a misidentification of cracks in the parietals, as preserved in the fossil. Restudy of the fossil has also led to the identification of a tabular bone adjacent to each parietal and above the squamosal.

There are around five small teeth in each premaxilla and more than 14 (possibly up to 19) in the maxilla. This is a high tooth count relative to most microsaurs. A high number of teeth are also present in the slender dentary bone of the lower jaw. The teeth mid-way down the maxilla are particularly large, lending their name to the genus ("Odontos" being Greek for "tooth"). The skull texture is mostly smooth, but a series of prominent pits are apparent on several bones, particularly the maxilla, frontal, and jugal. Similar pits are found on the skull of brachystelechids and Brachydectes. They may serve as canals for cranial nerves and blood vessels, or attachment sites for large scales. The rest of the body is lined with faint impressions of scales similar to those found in Joermungandr. The scales have a scallop-shell ornamentation, uniformly thin with radiating ridges.

The pterygoid bone of the palate (roof of the mouth) has small tooth-like denticles closely packed along the rear edge of a projection which extends outwards and forwards. This may be homologous to a structure found in amniotes: the transverse flange, a tooth-bearing horizontal ridge occupying a sharply angled rim at the back of the pterygoid. The rest of the palate of Odonterpeton is covered in a broad field of less evenly distributed denticles. Odonterpeton has a massive subtemporal fenestra, a hole behind each pterygoid which acts as a window for muscles stretching from the skull to the jaw. The braincase is well-integrated, with many constituent bones fused together. The parasphenoid (lower plate of the braincase) is relatively wide and triangular, tapering forwards to a stout cultriform process.

At least 18 narrow vertebrae are preserved behind the skull, each with a constricted form and a ventral midline keel. The forelimbs are tiny but well-ossified, with individual bones easily distinguishable. The pectoral girdle is also present, with a well-ossified clavicle and possible fragments of an interclavicle. Odonterpeton is similar to an amphiuma regarding the proportions of its forelimbs to the skull. The humerus, ulna, and radius are all very slender, and an olecranon process may be present at the elbow. The hand is diminutive, with only three fingers. The phalangeal formula (number of joints per finger) is 2-4-3. It is ambiguous whether hindlimbs were present, though a disarticulated bone on the main slab may represent a femur. Joermungandr, the sister taxon to Odonterpeton, does preserve hindlimbs.

== Classification ==
=== Earlier interpretations ===
Like many microsaurs, Odonterpeton was at first considered a small reptile upon its brief initial description by R.L. Moodie (1909). The holotype and single known specimen is a slab (USNM PAL 4465) and counterslab (USNM PAL 4467) stored at the National Museum of Natural History (Smithsonian) in Washington, D.C.

Many more recent studies consider "microsaurs" to be a grade or clade of small reptiliomorph amphibians which branched off the tetrapod family tree prior to amniotes. Microsaurs were historically classified as "lepospondyls", a term combining many unusual amphibian groups with reptile-like vertebrae and simplified skulls. Some recent studies, beginning with Pardo et al. (2017) have reinvigorated old debates by arguing that the legless aistopod lepospondyls are outside the tetrapod crown group, while recumbirostran microsaurs qualify as early reptiles.

Microsaur taxonomy was summarized in The Order Microsauria, a 1978 book by Robert Carroll and Pamela Gaskill. This overview proposed a two-fold division of microsaur taxonomy into Tuditanomorpha and Microbrachomorpha. Odonterpeton was assigned as a microbrachomorph based on its simple teeth, three-fingered hands, and skull roof bones which are strongly unequal in size. Other "microbrachomorphs" included aquatic forms like Microbrachis, Hyloplesion, and possibly "Brachystelechus" (Batropetes). Within Microbrachomorpha, Odonterpeton was given its own family, Odonterpetontidae.

The fundamental division proposed by Carroll and Gaskill (1978) has long been superseded by the results of phylogenetic analyses, though microsaur systematics are still unstable and little consensus exists. Many studies continued to support close affinities between Odonterpeton, Microbrachis, and Hyloplesion, either as a clade or a grade. One analysis, modified from previous studies with an expanded set of taxa, has suggested that Odonterpeton is completely unrelated to other "microbrachomorphs", and instead related to Sparodus.

=== 2022 redescription ===
Odonterpeton triangulare was revisited and redescribed by Mann, Pardo, and Sues (2022). Their redescription found it to be the sister species of Joermungandr bolti, from the Mazon Creek lagerstätte of Illinois. The family Odonterpetontidae had its name emended to Odonterpetidae, and Joermungandr was identified as a second member of the family. Apart from its roughly contemporaneous time and place, Odonterpeton shares many traits with Joermungandr. These include a rounded skull, short snout, tiny forelimbs, large parietals, a pineal foramen which is shifted forward far enough to contact the frontals, and thin, distinctively textured scales. Unlike Joermungandr, Odonterpeton retains a higher tooth count, a tabular bone next to the parietal, and better-ossified limb and shoulder bones.

According to the 2022 redescription, odonterpetids belong within the clade Recumbirostra, which encompasses many other long-bodied "microsaurs" with burrowing or semiaquatic adaptations. Recumbirostrans are classified among reptiles, inheriting the results of Pardo et al. (2017). Odonterpetids are particularly closely related to the Early Permian hapsidopareiids, represented by Llistrofus. Below is a cladogram showing the results of the analysis:

- Recumbirostra
  - Ostodolepididae
  - Gymnarthridae
  - Pariotichus
  - - Proxilodon
    - - Huskerpeton
      - - - Llistrofus
          - Odonterpetidae
            - Joermungandr
            - Odonterpeton
        - - - Aletrimyti
            - Dvellecanus
          - - Rhynchonkos
            - Chthonosauria
              - Molgophidae
              - Brachystelechidae

== Paleobiology ==
With its small size, small limbs, and presumed long body, Odonterpeton has been compared to fully aquatic salamanders such as Amphiuma. Supporting bones for external gills were tentatively identified in the neck region in 1978. However, these bones were later reinterpreted as cervical ribs. The skull of Odonterpeton has large eye sockets (suggesting good vision and an active lifestyle) and voluminous subtemporal fenestrae (suggesting a strong bite), though the unspecialized teeth indicate that most of its diet was likely soft invertebrates.

Odonterpeton preserves scale impressions very similar to its sister taxon Joermungandr. In Joermungandr, the ridged, slightly overlapping scales may combine both dermal bone (like many extinct amphibians) and a keratin covering (like many living reptiles). The scales could be an adaptation to help shed dirt while burrowing, an interpretation consistent with its flexible skeleton and long, streamlined body.

== Paleoecology ==
Odonterpeton was one of many vertebrates preserved in the Diamond Coal Mine of Linton, Ohio. Fossils are concentrated in a thick cannel coal bed contemporaneous with the Lower Freeport Coal of the Allegheny Group. The most common fossils are fish, particularly coelacanths (Rhabdoderma), small haplolepid 'palaeoniscoids' (Microhaplolepis, Parahaplolepis), and xenacanthid shark teeth (Orthacanthus). Lungfish teeth (Conchopoma, Sagenodus) and xenacanthid spines are less common but still far from rare. Legitimate rhizodont, megalichthyid, and acanthodian fossils are unknown from the deposit.

Among tetrapods, Odonterpeton is joined by at least 11 other species of lepospondyls. The most common lepospondyls, and indeed the most common tetrapods as a whole, are Sauropleura pectinata and Ptyonius marshii (both newt-like urocordylid nectrideans), followed by Ophiderpeton amphiuminum (a legless aistopod) and Diceratosaurus brevirostris (an early diplocaulid nectridean). Cocytinus gyrinoides, Molgophis (both lysorophians) and Phlegethontia linearis (an aistopod) also occur in sizable numbers.

Linton preserves at least 6 temnospondyl species, including common freshwater dvinosaurians (Isodectes obtusus, Erpetosaurus radiatus) and rare terrestrial dissorophoids (Platyrhinops lyelli, Stegops newberryi) and edopoids (Macrerpeton huxleyi). The colosteid Colosteus scutellatus is another common amphibian. Other amphibians are rare, such as the large baphetid Megalocephalus lineolatus, the embolomere Leptophractus obsoletus, and the small lizard-like gephyrostegid Eusauropleura digitata. Linton even preserves a few fully terrestrial amniote fossils, such as Anthracodromeus longipes (a eureptile) and Carbonodraco lundi (a fanged parareptile).

During the Pennsylvanian, Linton was a tropical fluviodeltaic environment, with a large meandering river flowing northwest towards a sandy delta. The fossil-bearing cannel coal deposit is encased in a thick but geographically narrow sequence of river sandstone. Due to a fault just north of Linton, the river valley passing through the area would have been deeper and more isolated relative to the shallow rivers common in the muddy floodplains of the surrounding region. The river meanders were prone to sudden cutoffs, creating abandoned channels and broad oxbow lakes. Peat was likely deposited as organic residue accumulating in a deep, stagnant channel with deoxygenated bottom waters hostile to decomposing organisms. Freshwater and riparian animals would have continued to inhabit shallower water until the channel was fully filled in by collapsed levee debris and encroaching land plants. Linton's vertebrate faunas may have been tolerant of mild salinity levels, which may explain the absence of fully freshwater specialist amphibians like microbrachids, micromelerpetontids, and branchiosaurids.
