= Diabloroter =

Diabloroter Temporal range: Carboniferous, 309–307 Ma

Scientific classification
- Domain: Eukaryota
- Kingdom: Animalia
- Phylum: Chordata
- Family: †Brachystelechidae
- Genus: †Diabloroter; Mann & Maddin, 2019
- Species: †D. bolti

Binomial name
- †Diabloroter bolti Mann & Maddin, 2019

Genus of brachystelechid

Diabloroter is a Carboniferous genus of brachystelechid 'microsaur' from the Mazon Creek lagerstätte in Illinois. It was named in 2019 by Arjan Mann and Hillary C. Maddin.

== History of study ==
The genus name is derived from the roots diabolus ("devil"), which refers to the stark red color of the latex peels used in the original study, and rota ("wheel") to refer to the English rotavator (a digger), which in turn refers to the fossorial ecology of recumbirostrans. The specific name honors American paleontologist John Bolt. The taxon is represented by a single, nearly complete skeleton that was collected from the Sunspot Mine at Mazon Creek, Illinois.

== Anatomy ==
Mann and Maddin (2019) diagnose Diabloroter by the following features: (1) long maxilla; (2) skull roof ornamented with radiating grooves; (3) circular pits on the prefrontal; and (4) a narrow and blunt snout. They differentiate it from the European Batropetes by: (1) reduced lengthening of the mid-dorsal ribs; and (2) a less robust pectoral girdle. They also differentiate it from the North American Quasicaecilia by: (1) less rounded skull; (2) reduced contribution of the nasals to the snout; and (3) more extensive lateral cheek.

The holotype measures approximately 5.3 cm in length with a 0.92 cm long skull.

== Relationships ==
Below is the strict consensus topology recovered by the maximum parsimony analysis of Mann & Maddin (2019):

- - Seymouria
  - - Limnoscelis
    - Amniota
      - Petrolacosaurus
      - Captorhinus
      - Opisthodontosaurus
      - - Ophiacodon
        - Dimetrodon
      - Recumbirostra
        - Pantylus
        - Llistrofus
        - - Micraroter
          - - Nannaroter
            - Pelodosotis
        - - - Huskerpeton
            - Cardiocephalus
          - - Rhynchonkos
            - - Aletrimyti
              - Dvellecanus
        - - - Brachydectes
            - Brachystelechidae
              - Quasicaecilia
              - - Diabloroter
                - - Batropetes
                  - Carrolla
