= Altenglanerpeton =

Altenglanerpeton Temporal range: Late Carboniferous or Early Permian, 299 Ma

Scientific classification
- Domain: Eukaryota
- Kingdom: Animalia
- Phylum: Chordata
- Clade: †Recumbirostra
- Genus: †Altenglanerpeton; Glienke, 2012

Type species
- †Altenglanerpeton schroederi Glienke, 2012

Extinct genus of tetrapods

Altenglanerpeton is an extinct genus of microsaur tetrapod from the Late Carboniferous or Early Permian of Germany. Altenglanerpeton was named in 2012 after the Altenglan Formation in which it was found. The type and only species is A. schroederi.

== Description ==
Altenglanerpeton is known from a single partial skeleton from an outcrop of the Altenglan Formation, which is part of the Saar–Nahe Basin. The Altenglan Formation dates back to the Carboniferous-Permian transition, about 299 million years ago. The skeleton was discovered sometime in the 1870s in the village of Werschweiler, and was first described by German paleontologist Eckart Schröder in 1939. Schröder tentatively assigned the specimen to the microsaur Microbrachis, although its classification as a microsaur was questioned in later years.

The holotype skeleton includes a crushed skull preserved in dorsal or top view, and a straight length of vertebrae and associated ribs that are poorly preserved. The forelimbs and parts of the pectoral girdle are also preserved. The hind limbs and tail are missing. Altenglanerpeton has a robust skull with small, widely spaced eye sockets. The skull appears triangular from above as well as from the side, since it has a narrow and pointed snout. One distinguishing feature of Altenglanerpeton is the extension of the jugal bones far in front of the eye sockets. Unlike many other microsaurs, Altenglanerpeton lacks a network of lateral line grooves across its skull. Altenglanerpeton has an elongated body with around 30 simple spool-shaped vertebrae and small, poorly developed limbs. It is similar in appearance to the ostodolepids Micraroter and Pelodosotis, both of which have long bodies and tiny limbs.

== Classification ==
Altenglanerpeton belongs to a group of early amphibians called microsaurs, characterized by their small size and simple vertebrae. When Altenglanerpeton was first named in 2012, a phylogenetic analysis was conducted to determine its relationship with other lepospondyls. In support of Schröder's original assignment, Altenglanerpeton was placed as a microsaur. "Microsauria" is now considered to be a paraphyletic grouping, meaning that it does not form a true clade. Altenglanerpeton belongs to a similar group called Recumbirostra, which is a clade. Altenglanerpeton was found to be most closely related to Tambaroter, named in 2011 from the Early Permian Tambach Formation of Germany. According to the analysis, Altenglanerpeton and Tambaroter form a clade that is the sister taxon to the family Brachystelechidae. Altenglanerpeton is most similar in appearance to ostodolepids, and although both are members of Recumbirostra, Ostodolepidae is only distantly related to Altenglanerpeton. Below is a cladogram showing the phylogenetic position of Altenglanerpeton from Glienke (2012):

- Recumbirostra
  - Microbrachidae
    - Microbrachis
  - - - Pantylidae
        - Pantylus
      - - Stegotretus
        - Sparodus
    - - - Gymnarthridae
          - - Cardiocephalus sternbergi
            - Cardiocephalus peabodyi
          - - Euryodus primus
            - Euryodus dalyae
        - Ostodolepidae
          - Pelodosotis
          - Micraroter
      - - - Goniorhynchidae
            - Rhynchonkos
          - Eocaecilia
        - - - Tambaroter
            - Altenglanerpeton
          - Brachystelechidae
            - Batropetes
            - Carrolla
            - Quasicaecilia

== Paleoenvironment ==
The layer of the Altenglan Formation in which Altenglanerpeton was found is thought to have been deposited in a lake environment, specifically that of Hauptkalk Lake, a large, shallow body of water that covered much of the Saar–Nahe Basin at the Carboniferous-Permian transition. Sedimentation rates in the lake were low, meaning that few fossils were preserved. Besides the Altenglanerpeton skeleton, only three tetrapod fossils are known from Hauptkalk Lake deposits: two specimens of the temnospondyl Apateon pedestris and a skull of the temnospondyl Sclerocephalus bavaricus. The microsaur Batropetes is also known from the Saar-Nahe Basin, but it comes from the younger Odernheim Subformation.

The presence of Altenglanerpeton in a lake deposit suggests that it was aquatic. The long body and reduced limbs would have facilitated lateral undulation as a form of swimming. Although it is not preserved in the holotype specimen, the tail may have had an elongated tadpole-like fin. In contrast, the robust skull and lack of lateral line grooves in Altenglanerpeton suggest that it was primarily terrestrial. While most aquatic amphibians have large, forward-facing eyes and three-dimensional vision for capturing prey underwater, Altenglanerpeton has small, laterally-directed eyes that would have been more suitable for burrowing, as in living caecilians. With its elongated body, Altenglanerpeton may have undulated through soil and leaf litter.
