= Stegotretus =

Stegotretus Temporal range: Late Carboniferous or Early Permian

Scientific classification
- Kingdom: Animalia
- Phylum: Chordata
- Family: †Gymnarthridae
- Genus: †Stegotretus; Berman, Eberth & Brinkman, 1988

Type species
- †Stegotretus agyrus Berman, Eberth & Brinkman, 1988

Extinct genus of tetrapods

Stegotretus is an extinct genus of microsaur referred to the Pantylidae. It is known from the Carboniferous–Permian boundary Cutler Formation exposures of New Mexico.

== History of study ==
Material now referred to Stegotretus was first described (in brief) by Eberth & Berman (1983). It was formally named by Berman et al. (1988). The genus name comes from the Greek stegos ('roof') and tretos ('perforated') to refer to a large fenestra found on the palatine bone. The species name, S. agyrus, is said to be derived from Greek agyrus ('gathering' / 'crowd') in reference to the concentration of all known specimens in a small area. The proper word in ancient Greek for 'gathering' / 'crowd' is however agora (ἀγορά), with the variant agyris (ἄγυρις) in the Aeolic dialect. The holotype and referred materials are currently reposited in the Carnegie Museum of Natural History. A large number of partial to complete skulls and associated postcrania are known for this taxon.

== Anatomy ==
Despite the large number of specimens of Stegotretus, many are poorly preserved or distorted. Stegotretus is diagnosed by the presence of only two premaxillary teeth and by a large circular fenestra on the palatine. A contact between the maxilla and the quadratojugal and the absence of an entepicondylar foramen on the humerus separate it from the purportedly closely related Pantylus.

== Relationships ==
Stegotretus was classified as a pantylid by Berman et al. (1988). This has been validated by phylogenetic analyses that include the taxon, although it is sometimes recovered as being more closely related to Sparodus than to Pantylus when all three taxa are sampled. Below is the result of the analysis by Huttenlocker et al. (2013):

- Microsauria
  - - Microbrachis
  - - Asaphestera
    - - Tuditanus
      - - - Hapsidopareion
          - Saxonerpeton
        - Recumbirostra
          - - - Pantylus
              - Stegotretus
            - - - Carrolla
                - Batropetes
              - - Rhynchonkos
                - Eocaecilia
          - - Nannaroter
            - - Pelodosotis
              - Micraroter
            - - - Proxilodon bonneri
                - - Tambaroter
                  - Huskerpeton englehorni
              - - Pariotichus
                - - Euryodus dalyae
                  - Euryodus primus
                - - Cardiocephalus sternbergi
                  - Cardiocephalus peabodyi
