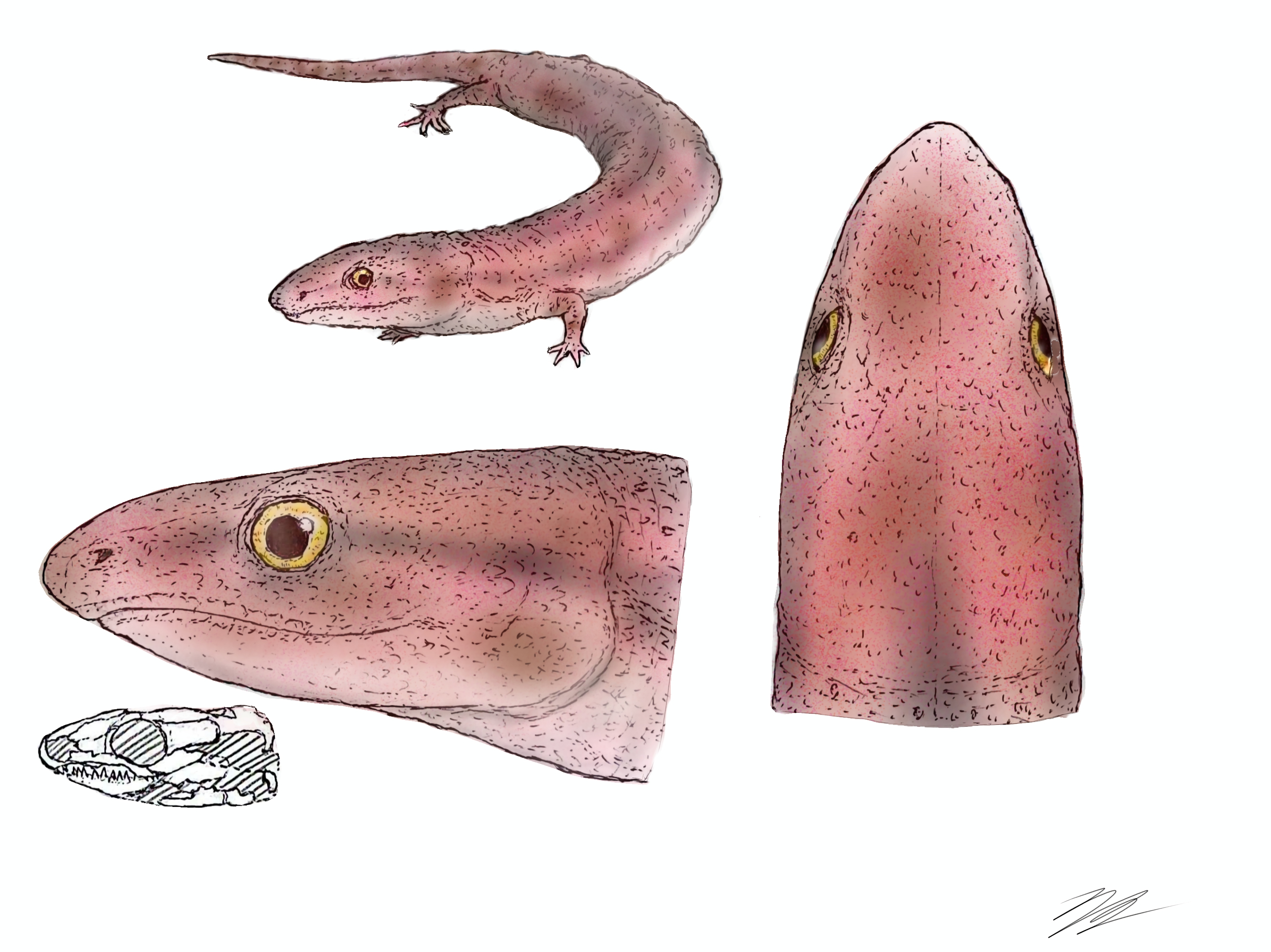

Scientific classification
- Kingdom: Animalia
- Phylum: Chordata
- Clade: †Recumbirostra
- Genus: †Proxilodon; Huttenlocker et al., 2013

Type species
- †Proxilodon englehorni (Schultze & Foreman, 1981 [originally Euryodus bonneri])

= Proxilodon =

Proxilodon Temporal range: Early Permian

Extinct genus of amphibians

Proxilodon is an extinct genus of recumbirostran microsaur from the Early Permian Speiser Formation of Kansas, United States. It contains a single species, Proxilodon bonneri, (formerly "Euryodus" bonneri).

== History of study ==
There is only one known specimen of Proxilodon bonneri, the former holotype of Euryodus bonneri, named by Schultze & Foreman (1981). It was collected in 1976 by Brian Foreman from a roadcut site in Kansas in the lower Speiser Formation (often called the Speiser Shale) that preserves primarily aquatic vertebrates, such as the lungfish Gnathorhiza, the dvinosaur temnospondyl Acroplous vorax, the nectridean lepospondyl Diplocaulus, and the lysorophian Lysorophus tricarinatus. The species was named after Orville Bonner, who prepared the specimen, a complete skull with the left lower jaw in articulation and associated vertebrae and a fragmentary humerus. Huttenlocker et al. (2013) identified numerous differences from other species of Euryodus and erected the new genus Proxilodon, derived from a Latinized version of the Greek 'Euryodus,' which means 'broad-tooth' and which was the original taxonomic identification; 'proxilus' in Latin for broad/wide, and '-odon' refers to 'tooth.'

== Anatomy ==
As with gymnarthrids like Euryodus, Proxilodon possesses a long postorbital region and a slightly convex occiput, but it also has a much narrower skull than is typical of Euryodus and a higher premaxillary tooth count, among other features, that differentiate it from gymnarthrids at large. Other features listed in the diagnosis include a small notch in the premaxilla that articulates with the nasal, a nasal longer than it is broad (in line with the generally narrow skull), and the absence of a pineal foramen, instead being replaced by a shallow fossa. The holotype skull is typically sized for 'microsaurs,' measuring slightly less than 19 mm in length. Most of the internal anatomy is obscured by the articulation with the skull.

== Relationships ==
A phylogenetic analysis of the position of Proxilodon, and another novel taxon, Huskerpeton, by Huttenlocker et al. (2013) recovered Proxilodon as a recumbirostran microsaur within a clade formed by gymnarthrids, ostodolepids, and their relatives. Below is the topology recovered by those authors:

- - - Microbrachis
  - - Asaphestera
    - - Tuditanus
      - - - Hapsidopareion
          - Saxonerpeton
        - Recumbirostra
          - - - Pantylus
              - Stegotretus
            - - - Carrolla
                - Batropetes
              - - Rhynchonkos
                - Eocaecilia
          - - Nannaroter
            - - Pelodosotis
              - Micraroter
            - - - Proxilodon bonneri
                - - Tambaroter
                  - Huskerpeton englehorni
              - - Pariotichus
                - - Euryodus dalyae
                  - Euryodus primus
                - - Cardiocephalus sternbergi
                  - Cardiocephalus peabodyi
