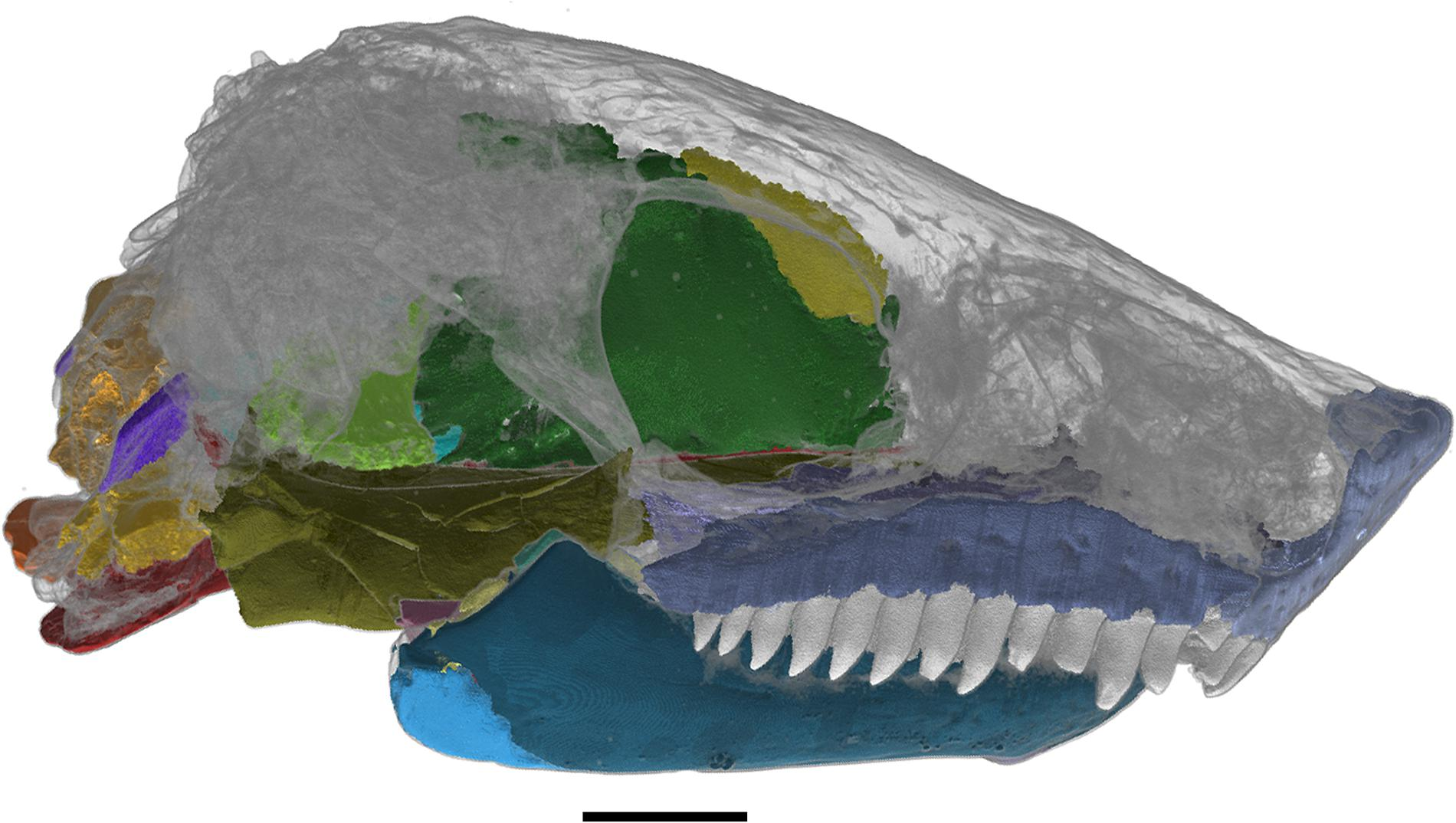

Scientific classification
- Kingdom: Animalia
- Phylum: Chordata
- Family: †Ostodolepidae
- Genus: †Nannaroter; Anderson et al., 2009

Species
- N. mckinziei Anderson et al., 2009 (type)

= Nannaroter =

Nannaroter Temporal range: Early Permian

Extinct genus of amphibians

Nannaroter is an extinct genus of Recumbirostran tetrapod within the family Ostodolepidae.

== History of study ==
Nannaroter was named in 2009 by Canadian paleontologists Jason Anderson, Diane Scott, and Robert Reisz. It was known from only the holotype specimen, which was found at the Richards Spur locality in Oklahoma. The holotype, a well preserved skull, was found in early Permian-aged fissure fill deposits in Ordovician limestone. The specific name is given for Mark McKinzie, who found and donated the specimen to the Sam Noble Oklahoma Museum of Natural History.

In 2021 a second specimen was referred, ROMVP 86541, a skull with right lower jaw.

== Anatomy ==
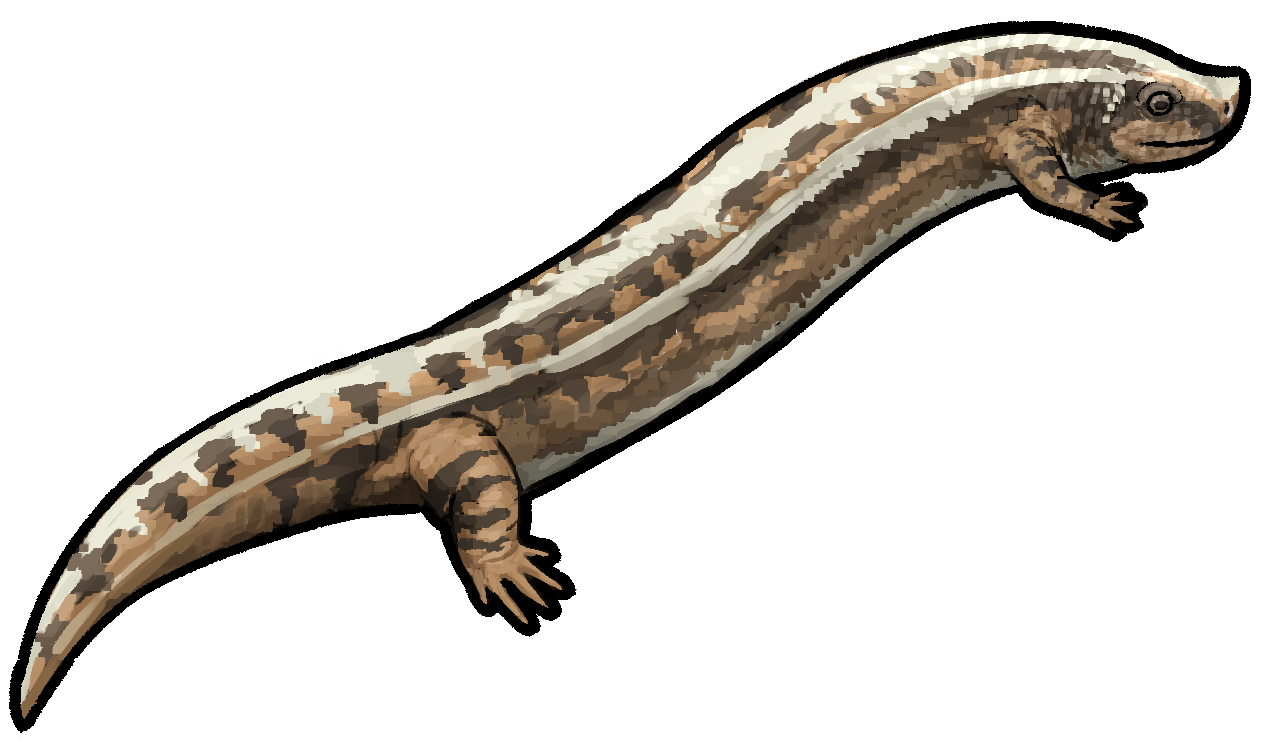
Life Restoration

Nannaroter is the smallest known ostodolepid and is diagnosed by: (1) the high subtemporal recess that separates the postorbital from the squamosal; (2) four premaxillary tooth positions; (3) 12 maxillary tooth positions; circumorbital walls formed by medial laminae of the prefrontal, lacrimal, and jugal; (5) a ventral flange of the frontal meeting the sphenethmoid; (7) an anterolaterally bulbous sphenethmoid; and (8) a massive epipterygoid. Like other ostodolepids, it has a wedge-shaped skull, a pointed snout, and a temporal emargination. The skull is highly ossified in order to resist anteroposteriorly directed forces, as indicated by the markedly interdigitated sutures.

== Ecology ==
The high degree of ossification in the skull of Nannaroter is seen as an adaptation to a fossorial, or burrowing, lifestyle. More specifically, the animal would likely have used its recumbent snout to push forward into the substrate, facilitated by increased epaxial musculature that inserted into the broad, sloping occiput, as in amphisbaenians. As Nannaroter was known from only one specimen, it has been suggested that it was either a naturally rare component of the assemblage or that its inferred burrowing ecology did not lend itself well to preservation in the fissure fill system.

== Relationships ==
Below is the placement of Nannaroter in the analysis of Huttenlocker et al. (2013):

- - - Microbrachis
  - - Asaphestera
    - - Tuditanus
      - - - Hapsidopareion
          - Saxonerpeton
        - Recumbirostra
          - - - Pantylus
              - Stegotretus
            - - - Carrolla
                - Batropetes
              - - Rhynchonkos
                - Eocaecilia
          - - Nannaroter
            - - Pelodosotis
              - Micraroter
            - - - Proxilodon bonneri
                - - Tambaroter
                  - Huskerpeton englehorni
              - - Pariotichus
                - - Euryodus dalyae
                  - Euryodus primus
                - - Cardiocephalus sternbergi
                  - Cardiocephalus peabodyi
