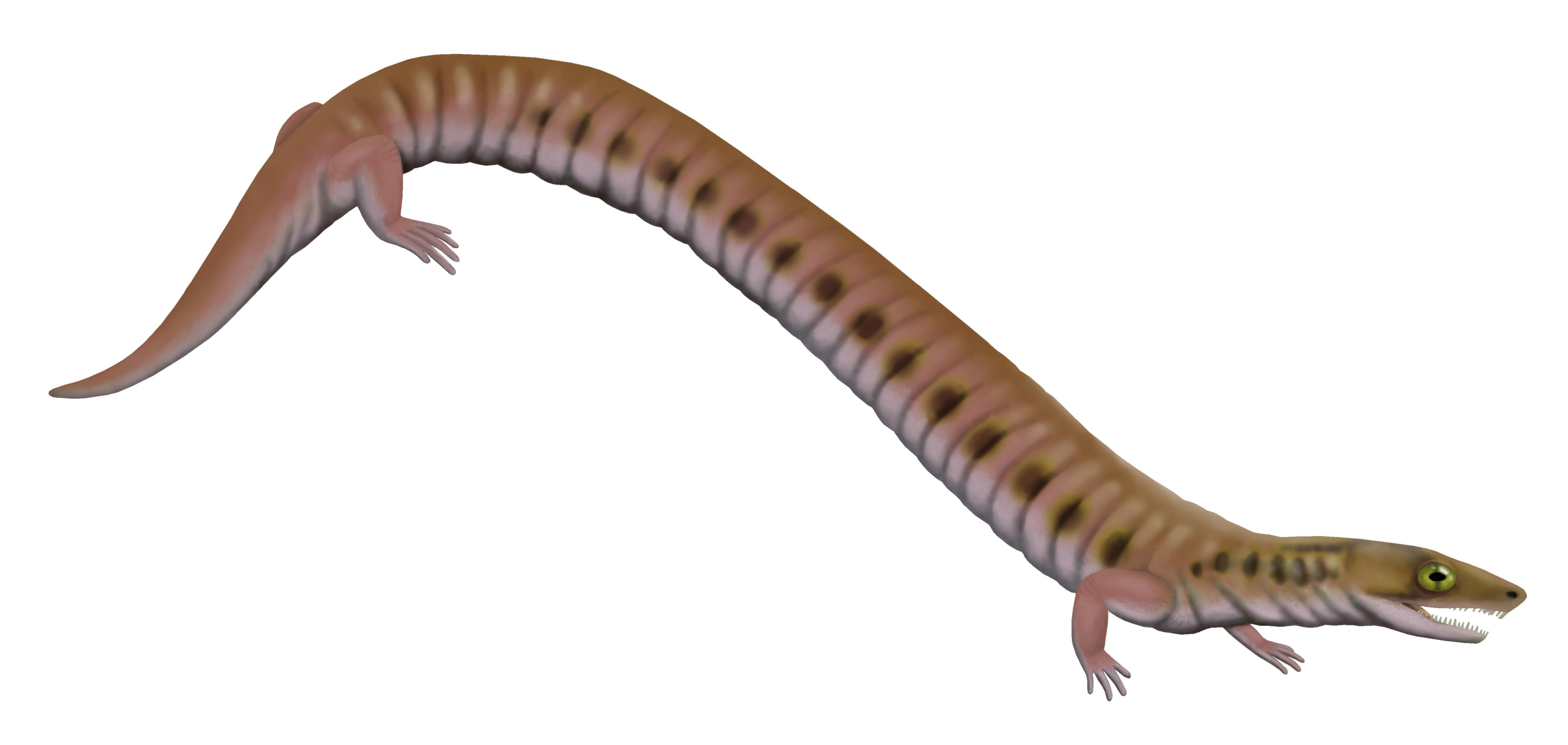
- Life restoration of Rhynchonkos, a rhynchonkid
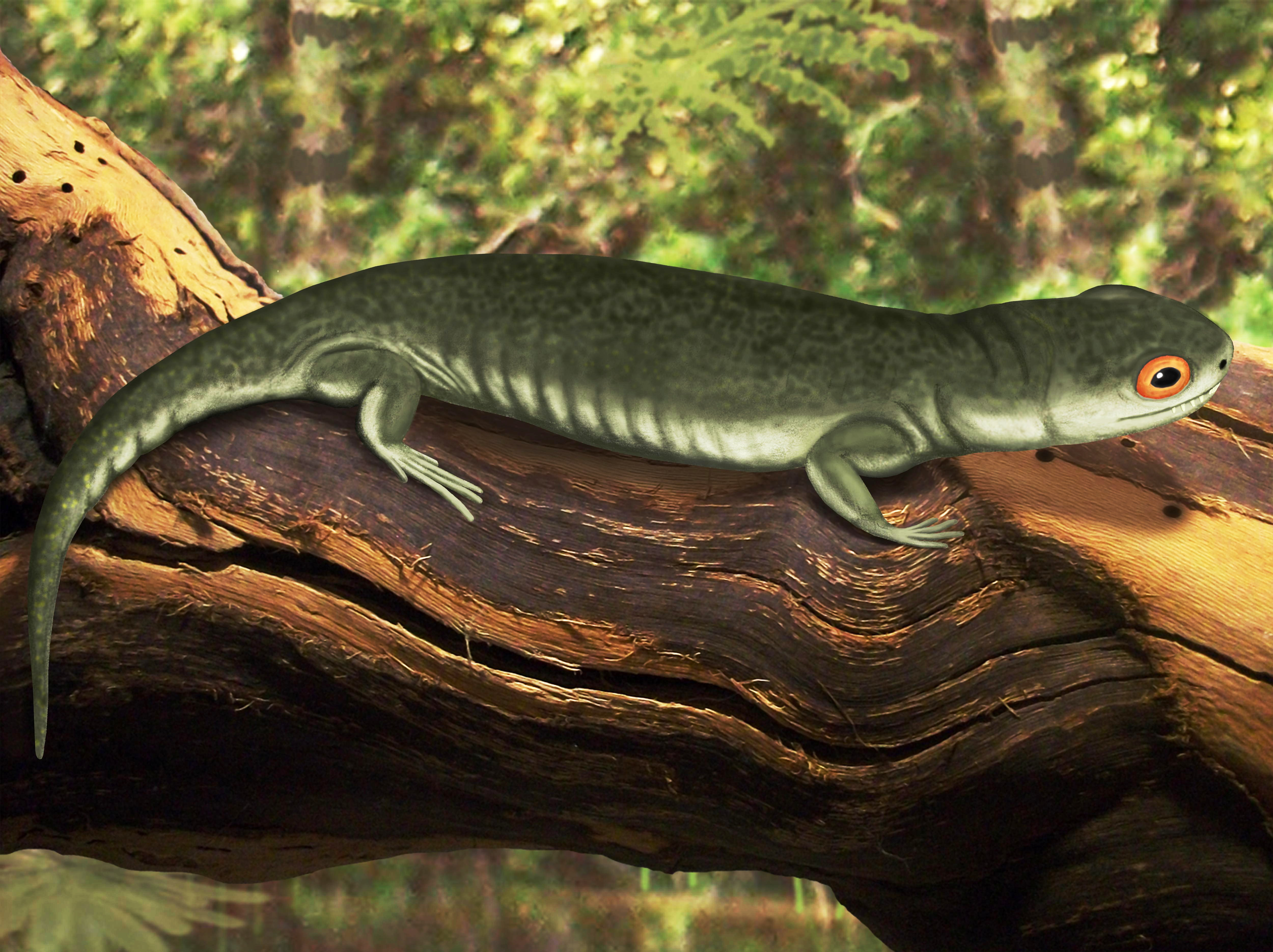
- Life restoration of Batropetes, a brachystelechid

Scientific classification
- Kingdom: Animalia
- Phylum: Chordata
- Clade: Reptiliomorpha
- Clade: †Recumbirostra; Anderson, 2007

Subgroups
- see text

= Recumbirostra =

Recumbirostra Temporal range: Late Carboniferous - Early Permian, 323.2–293.52 Ma

Extinct clade of tetrapods

Recumbirostra is a clade of tetrapods which lived during the Carboniferous and Permian periods. They are thought to have had a fossorial (burrowing) lifestyle and the group includes both short-bodied and long-bodied snake-like forms. At least one species, the long-bodied molgophid Nagini mazonense, lost its forelimbs entirely. Recumbirostra includes the families Brachystelechidae, Gymnarthridae, Molgophidae, Ostodolepidae, Pantylidae, and Rhynchonkidae. Brachystelechids and molgophids have been grouped in the suggested clade Chthonosauria, while gymnarthrids, rhynchonkids, and ostodolepidids have been grouped in the clade Nastrondormes.

Recumbirostra was erected as a clade in 2007 to include many of the taxa traditionally grouped in "Microsauria", which has since been shown to be a paraphyletic or polyphyletic grouping. Like other "microsaurs", the recumbirostrans have traditionally been considered to be members of the subclass Lepospondyli; however, many phylogenetic analyses conducted since the 2010s have recovered recumbirostrans as basal sauropsid (reptilian) amniotes instead. However, the placement of recumbirostrans as reptiles has been challenged by other authors, who have recovered them as stem-amniotes instead, and contended that the shared characters between recumbirostrans and reptiles are convergent, or the result of incorrect character encoding. Not all phylogenetic analyses recognize Recumbirostra as a valid grouping. An alternative clade called Tuditanomorpha is occasionally supported and includes many of the same taxa. Furthermore, the taxa that are often considered to be recumbirostrans have been found among amphibians (and not as a distinct clade) in some analyses.

== Classification ==
=== Taxonomy ===
- Altenglanerpeton
- Sparodus
- Steenerpeton?
- Trihecaton?
- Hapsidopareiidae
- Pantylidae
- Odonterpetidae
  - Odonterpeton
  - Joermungandr
- Chthonosauria
  - Brachystelechidae
  - Lysorophia?
- Nastrondormes
  - Gymnarthridae
  - Rhynchonkidae (previously Goniorhynchidae)
    - Aletrimyti
    - Dvellecanus
    - Rhynchonkos
  - Ostodolepidae

=== Phylogeny ===
The cladogram below shows the phylogenetic relationships of recumbirostrans following the results of Mann et al. (2026), which used the 2025 dataset of Jenkins et al. (the most comprehensive available matrix at the time of publication). Clade terminology is added using the latter study:

- Reptiliomorpha
  - †Seymouria
  - - †Solenodonsaurus
    - - - †Limnoscelis
        - - †Captorhinidae
          - - †Protorothyris
            - Amniota
              - Sauropsida
              - Synapsida
      - †Recumbirostra
        - †Pantylidae
          - †Pantylus
          - †Tyrannoroter
        - - - - †Hapsidopareiidae
                †Hapsidopareion
              - †Odonterpetidae
                - †Joermungandr
                - †Odonterpeton
            - †Chthonosauria
              - †Molgophidae
                - †Infernovenator
                - - †Brachydectes
                  - †Nagini
              - †Brachystelechidae
                - †Bromerpeton
                - - †Quasicaecilia
                  - - †Diabloroter
                    - - †Batropetes
                      - †Carrolla
          - †Nastrondormes
            - - †Huskerpeton
              - †Proxilodon
            - - †Gymnarthridae
                - †Euryodus
                - - †Pariotichus
                  - †Cardiocephalus
              - - †Rhynchonkidae
                  - †Rhynchonkos
                  - - †Aletrimyti
                    - †Dvellecanus
                - †Ostodolepididae
                  - - †Pelodosotis
                    - †Tambaroter
                  - - †Micraroter
                    - †Nannaroter

== Gallery ==
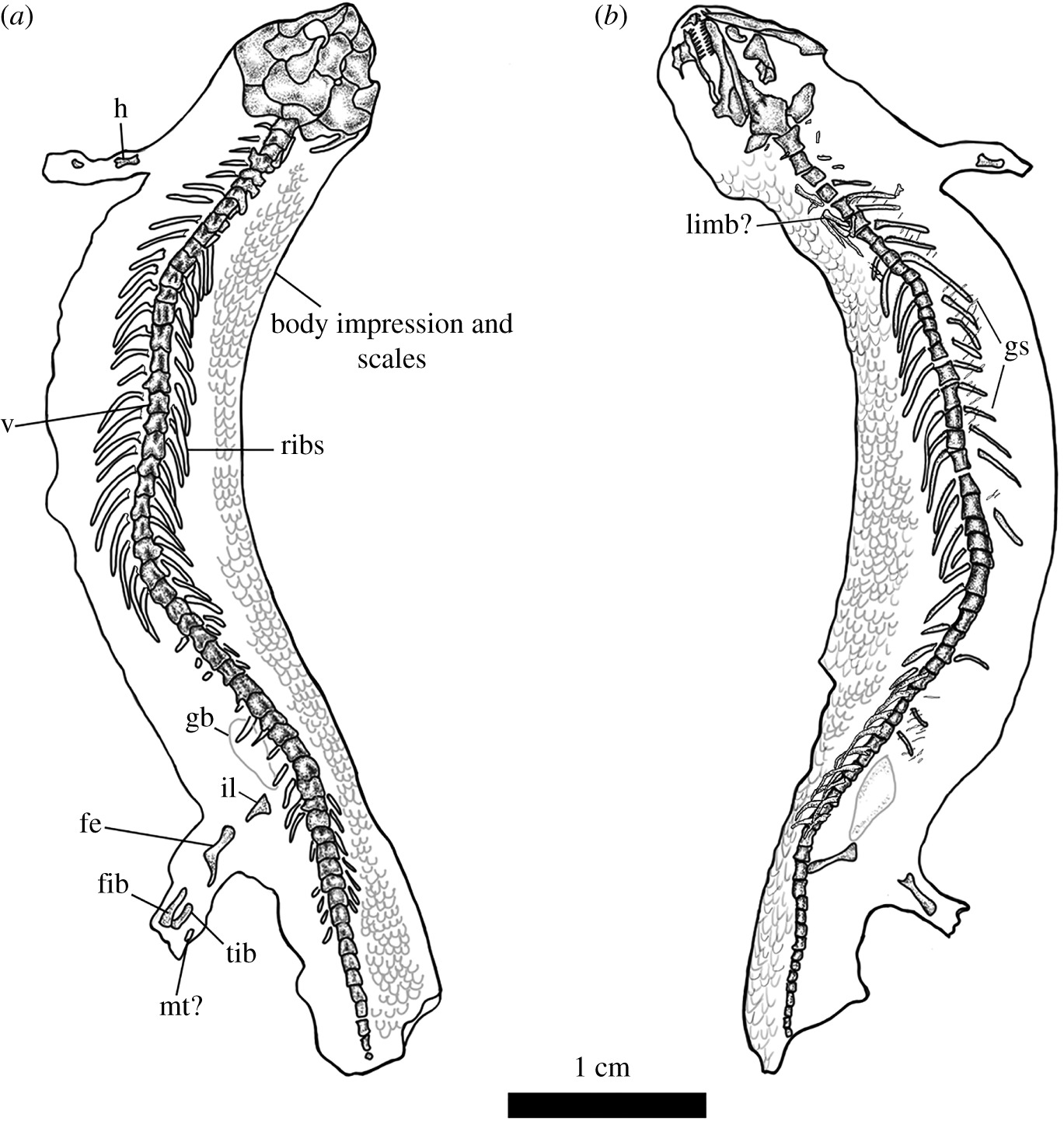
Skeleton of Joermungandr bolti, showing preserved remains of scales

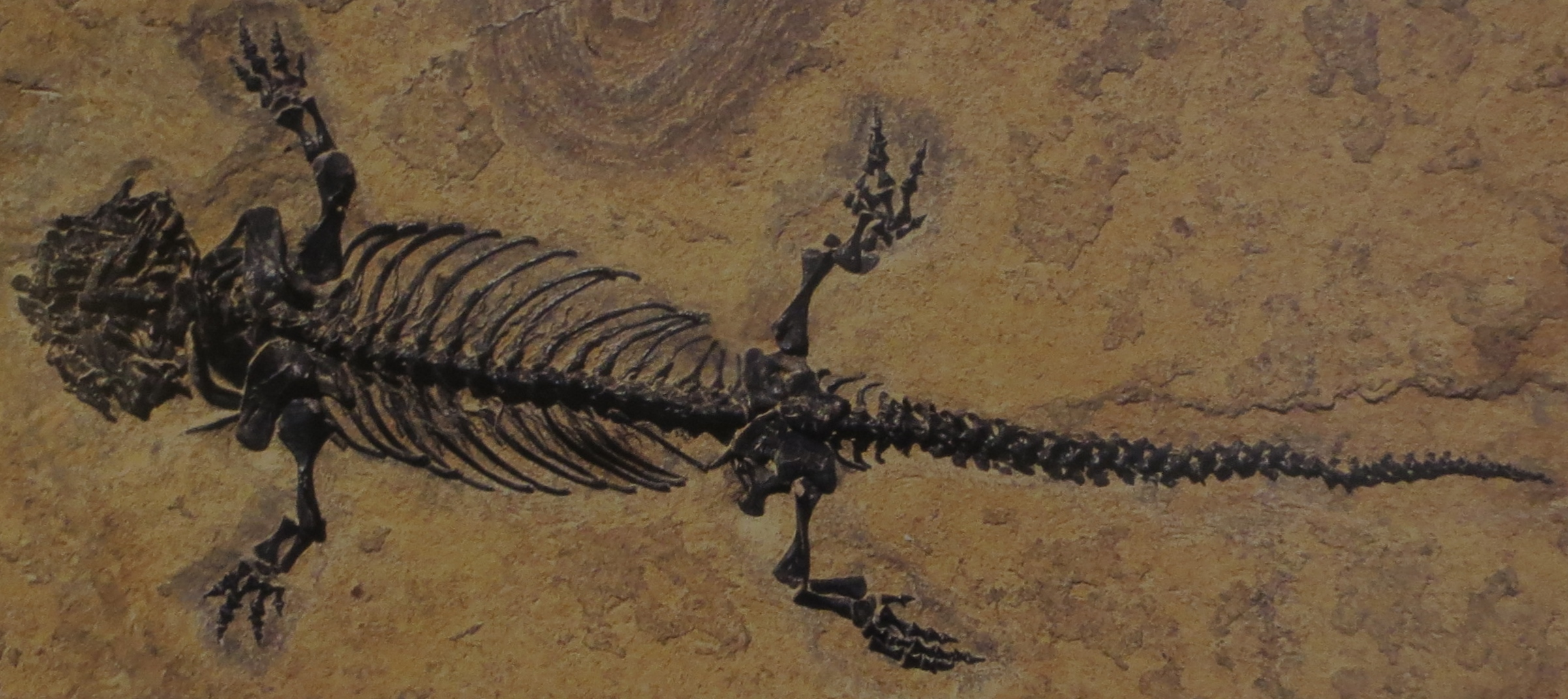
Skeleton of the brachystelechid Batropetes

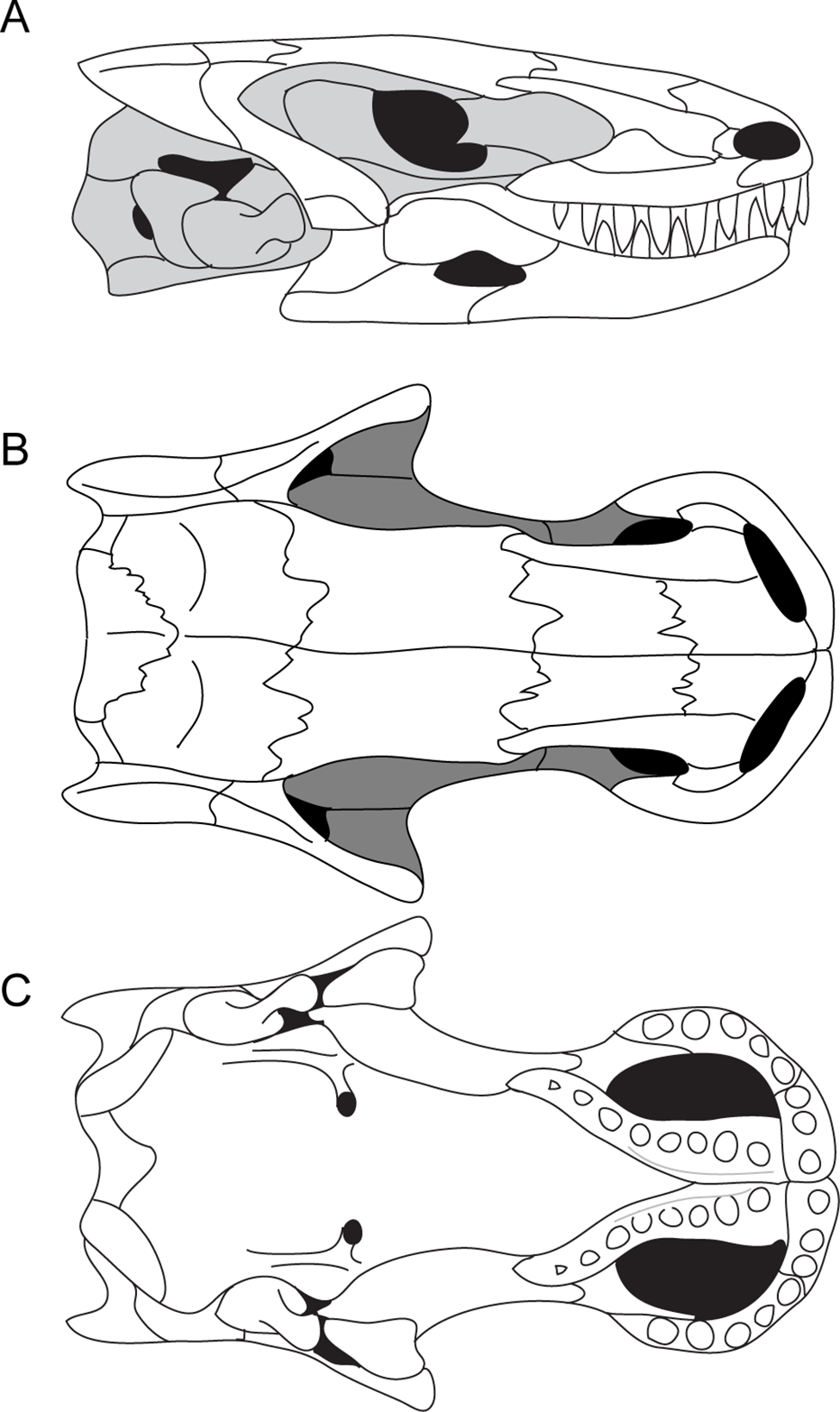
Skull of the molgophid Brachydectes

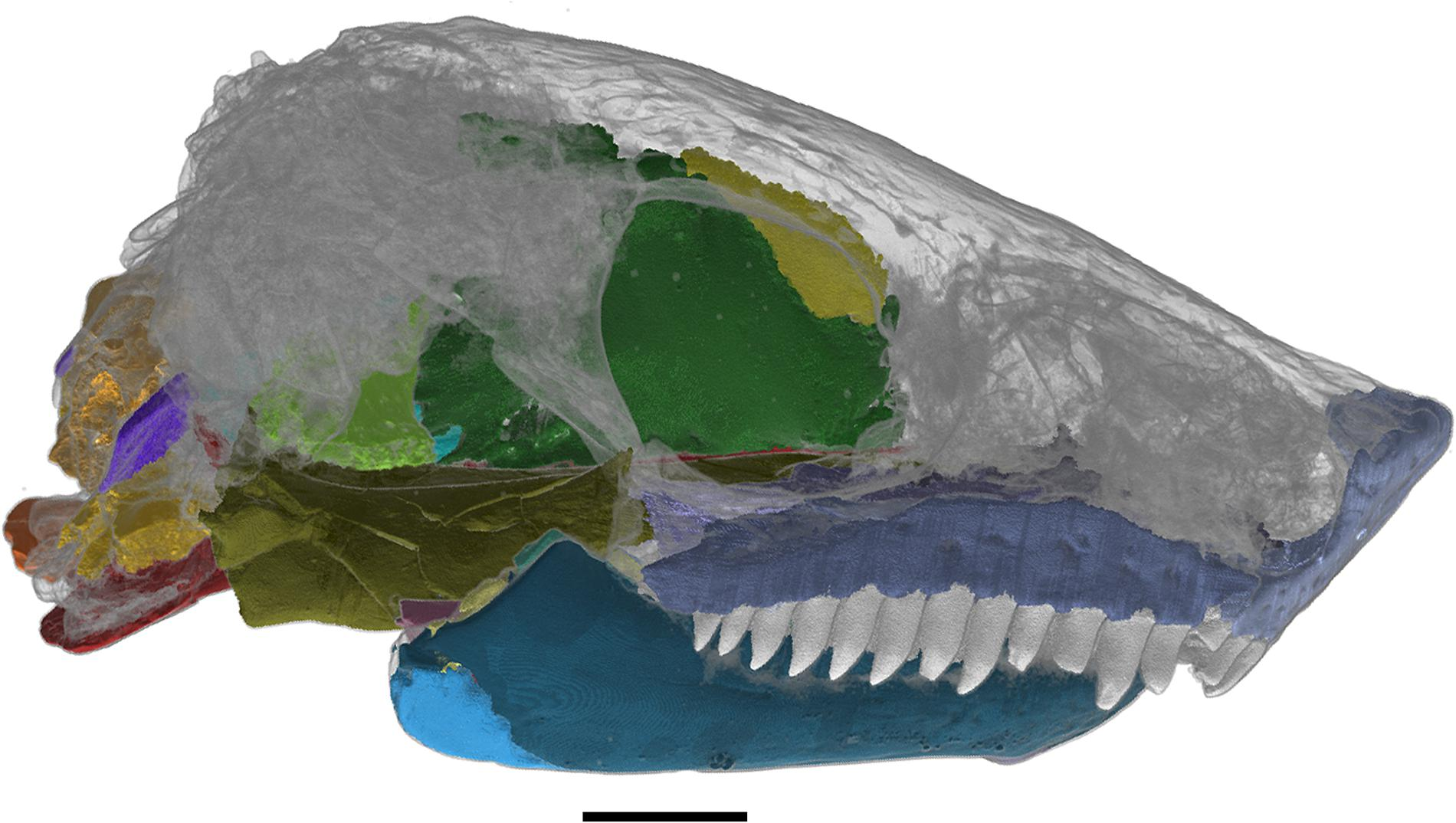
Skull of the ostodolepid Nannaroter
