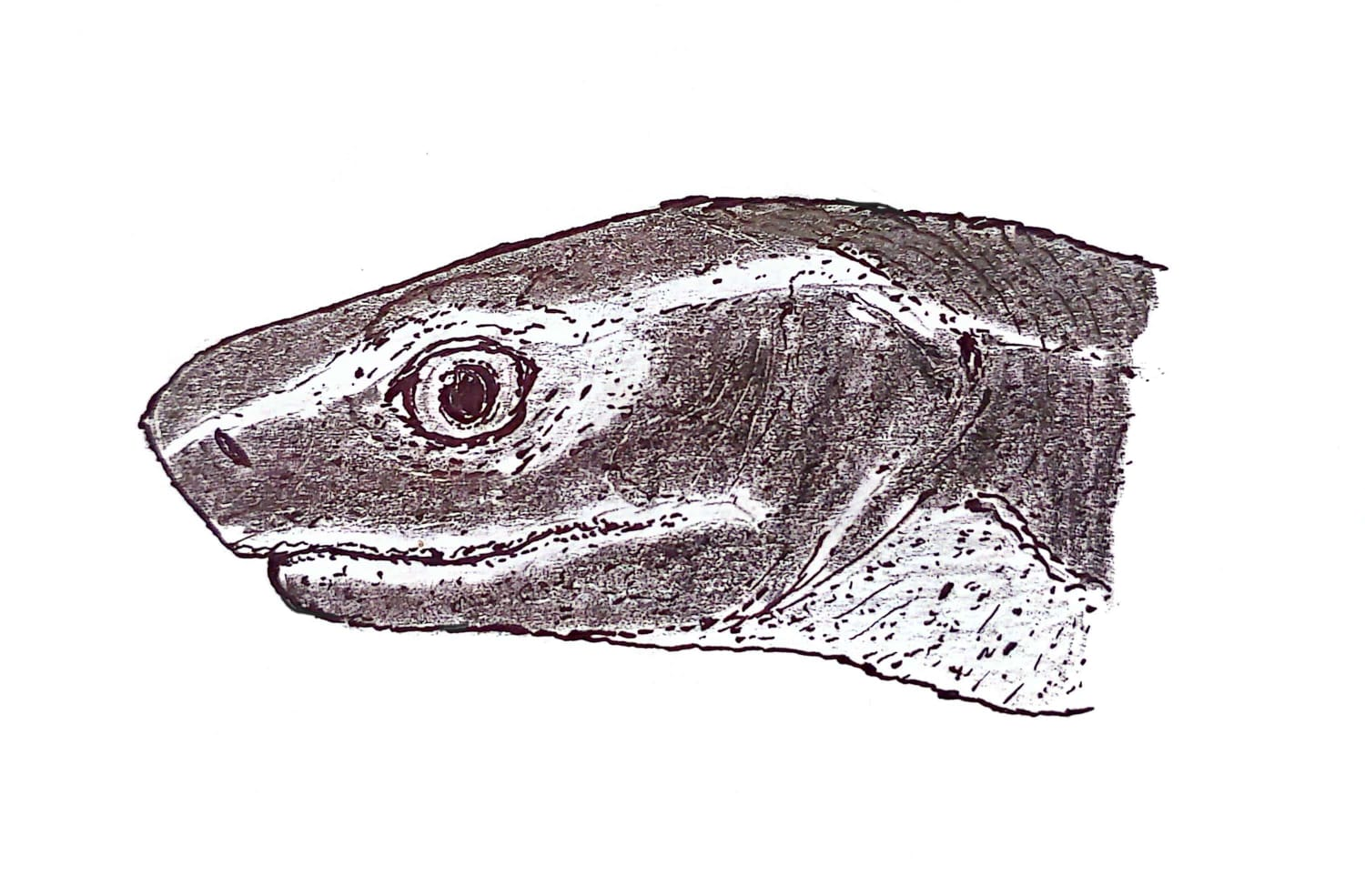
- Reconstruction of the head

Scientific classification
- Kingdom: Animalia
- Phylum: Chordata
- Family: †Brachystelechidae
- Genus: †Carrolla; Langston & Olson, 1986
- Species: †C. craddocki

Binomial name
- †Carrolla craddocki Langston & Olson, 1986

= Carrolla =

Carrolla Temporal range: Lower Permian

Extinct genus of amphibians

Carrolla is an extinct genus of brachystelechid 'microsaur' that lived in the Lower Permian in North America. It was named in 1986 by American paleontologists Wann Langston and Everett Olson. The type species, Carrolla craddocki, is the only known species.

== History of study ==
Carrolla was named for the type species by Langston & Olson (1986) for a single, complete skull (TxVP 40031-54) collected from the early Permian of Archer County, Texas; the specimen is reposited at the Texas Vertebrate Paleontology Collections at the University of Texas at Austin. They immediately recognized the similarity to 'Brachystelechus,' the eponymous genus from Europe; this genus was subsequently synonymized with Batropetes, traditionally considered a reptile but which had taxonomic precedent. Numerous features were cited as evidence for an ability to burrow, which was considered rare among 'microsaurs' at the time, and several shared features with modern amphibians were noted, although some of these have been subsequently disproven. Maddin et al. (2011) provided a detailed re-description of the holotype based on CT data; this study was one of the first to explore 'microsaur' anatomy using tomographic methods. These authors provided substantial new information on the internal anatomy, particularly the braincase, and recovered support for close affinities of brachystelechids and caecilians in the longstanding debate over the origin of modern amphibians. Mann et al. (2019) reported the first postcrania of the taxon based on a small block that was catalogued with the holotype skull but never described; the authors indicate that correspondence with K.W. Craddock, who found the holotype, corroborates that the postcrania block was recovered in association with the skull. The authors also validated Glienke's (2015) previous cursory interpretation of at least some of the teeth as tricuspid, a feature found in some other brachystelechids.

== Anatomy ==
The most recent diagnosis was provided by Maddin et al. (2011) and includes features such as a short, wide skull with a well-ossified anterior braincase. Some of the diagnostic features have been shown to be shared with other taxa following similar CT analyses of additional 'microsaurs'; more recent work on other brachystelechids including Glienke (2015) and Pardo et al. (2015) have provided additional features that separate those taxa from Carrolla. For example, both Quasicaecilia and Carrolla share extensively ossified posterior braincases and anterior braincases, but the morphology of some features, such as the element termed the 'presphenoid' by Pardo et al. differs between them. The presence of bicuspid teeth was reported by Langston & Olson, a feature of great interest because it has traditionally been considered to be a feature linking them to modern amphibians, the only living tetrapods with bicuspid teeth, but subsequent workers identified tricuspidity in the holotype.

== Relationships ==
Below is the strict consensus tree from Mann & Maddin (2019):

- - Seymouria
  - - Limnoscelis
    - Amniota
      - Petrolacosaurus
      - Captorhinus
      - Opisthodontosaurus
      - - Ophiacodon
        - Dimetrodon
      - Recumbirostra
        - Pantylus
        - Llistrofus
        - - Micraroter
          - - Nannaroter
            - Pelodosotis
        - - - Huskerpeton
            - Cardiocephalus
          - - Rhynchonkos
            - - Aletrimyti
              - Dvellecanus
        - - - Brachydectes
            - Brachystelechidae
              - Quasicaecilia
              - - Diabloroter
                - - Batropetes
                  - Carrolla

== See also ==
- List of prehistoric amphibian genera
