= Jormungandr (disambiguation) =

Jörmungandr or Jormungandr can refer to:

- Jörmungandr, a giant sea serpent in Norse mythology
- Midgard Serpent (Marvel Comics), also known as Jormungand
- Jormungandr, a genus of fossil mosasaurs with only one member, Jormungandr walhallaensis
- Joermungandr, a genus of fossil tetrapods with only one member, Joermungandr bolti
- Jormungand (manga), a manga series
