= Nagini mazonense =

Nagini mazonense Temporal range: Moscovian, ~309–307 Ma

Scientific classification
- Domain: Eukaryota
- Kingdom: Animalia
- Phylum: Chordata
- Order: †Lysorophia
- Family: †Molgophidae
- Genus: †Nagini; Mann et al., 2022
- Species: †N. mazonense

Binomial name
- †Nagini mazonense Mann et al., 2022

Extinct genus of tetrapods

Nagini (from Sanskrit Nāgá, "snake") is an extinct genus of recumbirostran tetrapods from the middle Carboniferous of the Mazon Creek fossil beds, Illinois, United States. The type and only species, Nagini mazonense, was named by Arjan Mann and colleagues in 2022 from two specimens, both of which preserve soft tissue like other fossils from Mazon Creek: MPM VP359229.2 and FMNH PR 1031. It is a member of the Molgophidae, a lineage of amniote-like tetrapods which exhibited a pattern of body elongation and digit reduction on the limbs. Nagini is the first member of the group that shows the complete loss of the forelimbs and pectoral girdle, but it still has intact hindlimbs; this mirrors the pattern seen in the evolution of snakes, and suggests that molgophids underwent a similar mechanism of limb reduction beginning with the failure to form distinct forelimbs.
