= Bromerpeton =

Bromerpeton Temporal range: Cisuralian

Scientific classification
- Kingdom: Animalia
- Phylum: Chordata
- Family: †Brachystelechidae
- Genus: †Bromerpeton; MacDougall et al., 2024
- Species: †B. subcolossus

Binomial name
- †Bromerpeton subcolossus MacDougall et al., 2024

Extinct genus of recumbirostran

Bromerpeton is an extinct genus of recumbirostran from the Early Permian of Germany. It is a monotypic genus containing a single species, Bromerpeton subcolossus.

== Description ==
Bromerpeton is distinct from the other genera of Brachystelechidae in that it possesses five metacarpals which signifies the presence of five digits.
