= Dvellecanus =

Dvellecanus Temporal range: Early Permian

Scientific classification
- Kingdom: Animalia
- Phylum: Chordata
- Clade: †Recumbirostra
- Genus: †Dvellecanus; Szostakiwskyj et al., 2015

Type species
- †Dvellecanus carrolli Szostakiwskyj et al., 2015

Extinct genus of tetrapods

Dvellecanus is an extinct genus of recumbirostran tetrapod from the Early Permian of Oklahoma. The only species is Dvellecanus carrolli, which was named in 2015 on the basis of a skull that was originally attributed to the closely related recumbirostran Rhynchonkos stovalli (it was named alongside another new recumbirostran, Aletrimyti gaskillae, that was also once classified as R. stovalli). Dvellecanus, Rhynchonkos, and Aletrimyti all come from the Fairmont Shale near the city of Norman in Cleveland County which is within the Anadarko Basin. The name Dvellecanus is based on an anagram of Cleveland, "dvellecan."

D. carrolli has a skull morphology very similar to R. stovalli and A. gaskillae: it has a short, pointed snout, large eye sockets, and a sturdy braincase. All of these features are indicative of a fossorial or burrowing lifestyle for these species. The skull of Dvellecanus is more adapted to burrowing than that of Rhynchonkos, but less so than that of Aletrimyti.
