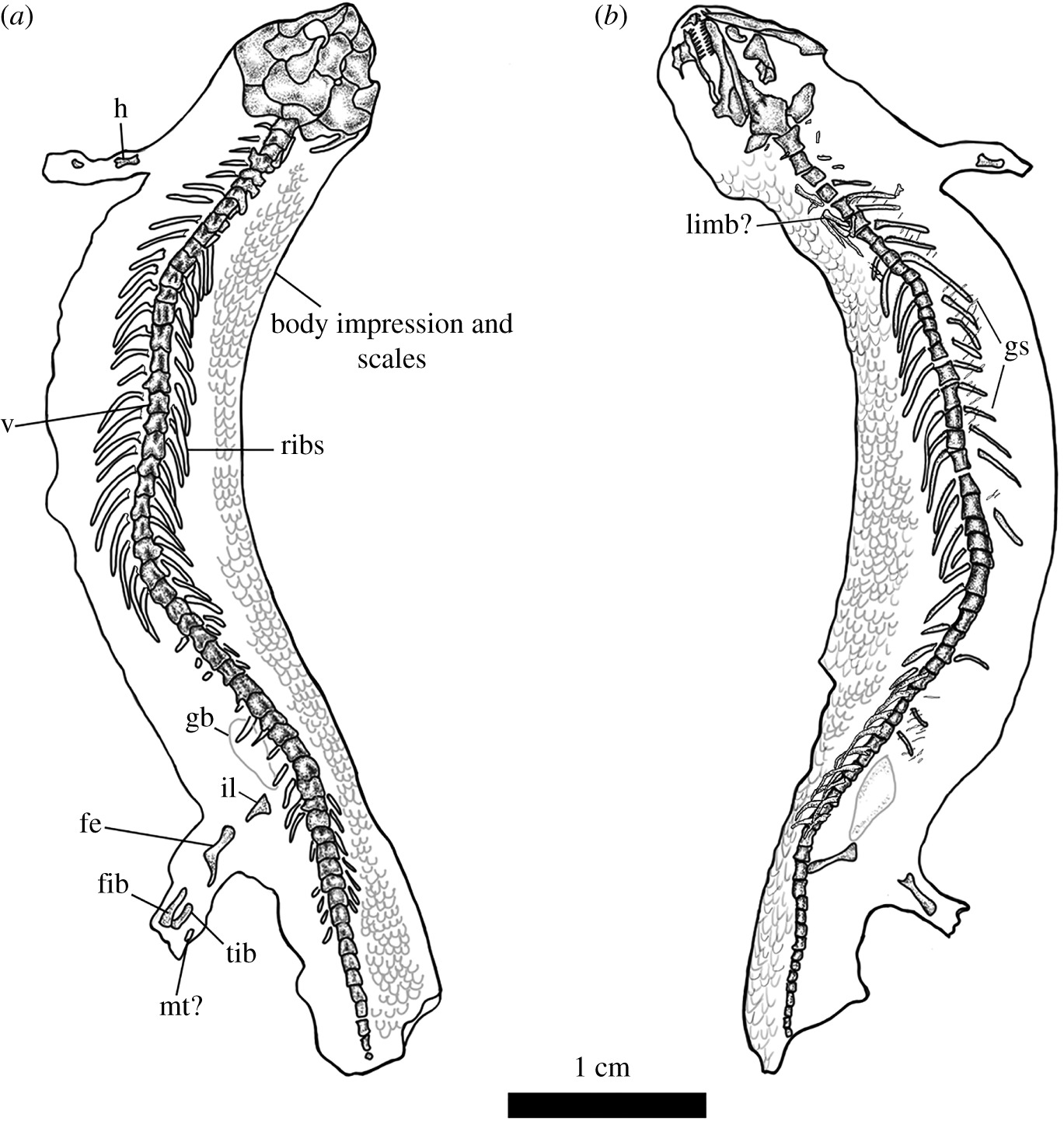

Scientific classification
- Kingdom: Animalia
- Phylum: Chordata
- Genus: †Joermungandr; Mann et al., 2021
- Species: †J. bolti

Binomial name
- †Joermungandr bolti Mann et al., 2021

= Joermungandr bolti =

Joermungandr bolti Temporal range: Pennsylvanian

Extinct genus of tetrapods

Joermungandr is an extinct genus of recumbirostran tetrapod from the Late Carboniferous Mazon Creek fossil beds of Illinois. It currently contains a single species, Joermungandr bolti. Like many other recumbirostrans, the body is elongated, which is likely an adaptation for fossoriality (digging and living underground).

The genus was named after Jörmungandr, a creature from Norse mythology.
