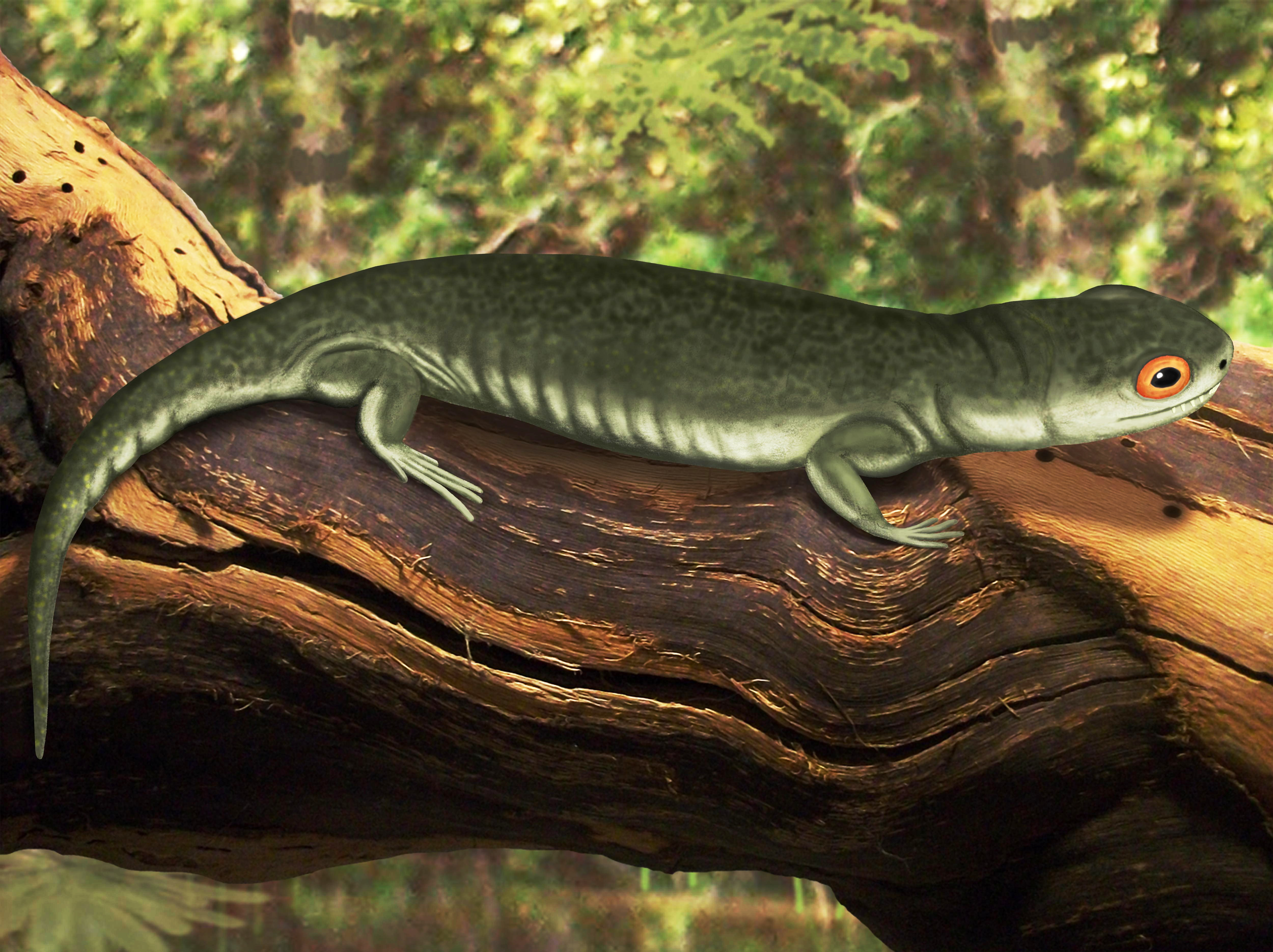
- Batropetes

Scientific classification
- Kingdom: Animalia
- Phylum: Chordata
- Clade: †Chthonosauria
- Family: †Brachystelechidae

= Brachystelechidae =

Brachystelechidae Temporal range: Early Permian

Extinct family of tetrapods

Brachystelechidae is an extinct family of Early Permian microsaurs. The family was first named by Robert L. Carroll and Pamela Gaskill in 1978, with the only member being Brachystelechus fritschi. Brachystelechus fritschi has since been reassigned to the genus Batropetes. Genera assigned to the family include: Batropetes, from Germany; Carrolla, from Texas; Quasicaecilia, also from Texas; Diabloroter, from the Mazon Creek lagerstätte of Illinois; and Bromerpeton from the Tambach Formation of Germany.
