= Huskerpeton =

Huskerpeton Temporal range: Early Permian

Scientific classification
- Kingdom: Animalia
- Phylum: Chordata
- Clade: †Recumbirostra
- Genus: †Huskerpeton; Huttenlocker et al., 2013

Type species
- †Huskerpeton englehorni Huttenlocker et al., 2013

Extinct genus of tetrapods

Huskerpeton ("Husker" after the University of Nebraska "corn huskers" and "-erpeton" meaning creeping in Greek) is an extinct genus of recumbirostran from the Early Permian period. They belong to the order Microsauria, which was established in 1863 by Dawson, and was quickly expanded to include many different small taxa. They lived in what is now Nebraska and Kansas. The holotype (and only existing specimen) of Huskerpeton was uncovered at the Eskridge formation in Nebraska, which is part of how it got its name.

Most recumbirostrans stayed very small in size, with skulls rarely larger than 1 cm long. Huskerpeton is no exception, with a skull length of 17mm and width of 13mm. Recumbirostra was established as a clade in 2007 to include many of the traditional microsaurs, and has since been shown to be a paraphyletic, or polyphyletic grouping. Recumbirostrans are characterized by "their reduced complement of dermal skull bones, a unique atlantooccipital joint, a shovel-like snout, and recumbent premaxilla," and are the first early tetrapods to show evidence of headfirst burrowing.

== History of Discovery ==
The holotype of the type species, Huskerpeton engelhorni, was discovered in 1989 by the University of Nebraska from the Eskridge formation near Humbolt county, Nebraska. This region was the first place non-marine fauna of the Permian were discovered in Nebraska. Of the three Eskridge localities: Mayer Farm, Raney, and Shot in the Dark Quarry, Huskerpeton was solely found at Mayer Farm. The only known specimen (UNSM 32144) is held permanently at the University of Nebraska State Museum vertebrate paleonontology collection in Lincoln, Nebraska. It is a partially complete specimen consisting of an almost complete skull, both lower jaws, and an articulated atlas-axis complex. James Englehorn, Huskerpeton englehorni's namesake, spent countless hours preparing this specimen as well as many others for the UNSM and DMNH collections.

Upon its discovery, specimen UNSM 32144 was categorized as Tuditanomorpha based on three characteristics: the postfrontal and postorbital are similar sizes and they both contact the large tabular, and the parietals, frontals, and nasals are also similar in size. It has been compared to conservative tuditanids but lacks a posterior flare of the squamosal, and gymnathrids but lacks bulbous teeth and a posterior occiput. Of the gymnarthids, USNM 32144 most closely resembles the type specimen "Eurodyus" bonneri based on basic skull morphology and dentition, however Carrol et al. (1998) questioned the viability of placement in the genus Euryodus because it only shares a couple of the diagnostic characteristics with gymnathrids. Huttenlocker et al. (2005) noted that they "tentatively" place specimen UNSM 32144 within the family Gymnarthridae, although more research was necessary at the time to make a more accurate placement.

Further phylogenetic analysis by Huttenlocker et al. in 2013 shows there are two major groups within recumbirostra. One group consists of pantylids, brachystelechids, and Rhynchonkos, and the second includes ostodolepids, gymnarthrids and their relatives, and Proxilodon and Huskerpeton. They uncovered a sister-taxon relationship between Proxilodon, Huskerpeton, and Tambaroter and Gymnarthridae.

Recently, microsauria has been re-evaluated and most of the taxa reassigned to recumbirostra. Maan et al. (2020) noted that the recumbirostran body plan may be derived from a sauropsid ancestor instead of lepospondyl ancestor based on their phylogenetic hypothesis. This change is also supported by a lack of transitional forms between lepospondyls and recumbirostrans. Therefore, the most recent understanding is that recumbirostra may belong to an amniote crown group (Pardo et al. 2017, Mann et al. 2019) instead of lepospondyli.

== Description ==
All descriptions are from Huttenlocker et al., 2013

The single specimen of Huskerpeton englehorni consists of a mostly complete, slightly crushed skull with both lower jaws. There is a lot of ossification of the braincase, and the ossification of the paired lateral element of the anterior braincase stops at the foramen ovale, unlike in most derived recumbirostrans, where it continues (pardo 2015). Scans taken with high resolution micro-CT scanning by the Computed Tomography Facility at the University of Texas, Austin.

=== Skull Roof ===
The dorsal process of the premaxilla broadly overlaps with the nasal and rapidly tapers off at midline suture. It also anteriorly overhangs the premaxillary teeth, which contributes to the overall recumbent shape of the snout. The premaxilla forms the entire anterior and the majority of the ventral border of the external naris, and there is space for five premaxillary teeth. There are also many tiny foramina on the anterior of the premaxilla.

The nasal is short and broader that the frontal and forms the roof of the enlarged naris. The maxilla is long and tapers off posteriorly around the posterior border of the orbit. The tooth row ends posteriorly, just beyond the orbit midpoint and holds space for 16-18 simple teeth. The dorsal process of the skull separates the jugal and lacrimal bones, which surround the large orbits in addition to the prefrontal, postfrontal, postorbital, and a small part of the maxilla. The lacrimal bone is large and trapezoidal. The posterior border of the orbit is also formed by the ascending orbital process of the extensive postorbital. Along the dorsal orbital rim, the narrow prefrontal bones make contact and extend rostrally to contact the external naris as well. The prefrontal is directly contacted by the postfrontal. The jugal forms a major part of the ventral orbit rim, and continues posteriorly to the cheek where it contacts the quadratojugal and squamosal, however the ventral margin is not straight, and instead curves dorsally.

Quadrangular frontals that are narrower, but equal in length to the parietals form a smooth dorsal surface and, together, the frontals and parietals encapsulate the majority of the dorsal skull roof. The parietals expand laterally form a broad plate and is twice as long as the postparietal.

=== Brain case and Occiput ===
The basioccipital, paired exoccipitals, and supraoccipital bind the large foramen magnum in the occipital region. The basioccipital is short and quadrangular and forms the posterior floor of the braincase. The exoccipitals are tall and shaped like a dumbbell. They form the lateral walls of the foramen magnum. Most microsaurs have an articular surface that is strongly facetated and forms a concave, strap-like articulation to the atlas, and Huskerpeton is no exception.

The otic capsule, unlike the braincase, is unsubstantially ossified. The posterior half of the otic capsule does not show a clear differentiation from the right exoccipital and is incomplete ventrally. The left side shows the prootic completing the fenestra vestibuli's dorsal and rostral margins. The supraoccipital is an unpaired element that sits low and forms the posterior section of the roof of the braincase.

The parashenoid forms the braincase's anteromedial floor, and the cultriform process tapers anteriorly, separates the pterygoids of the anterior plate, and is gently concave where it sits under the sphenethmoid. The basal plate resembles a triangle and slightly overlaps the basioccipital. It shows traces of foramina of the external carotid arteries. Like many other recumbirostans and lysorophians, Huskerpeton has ossifications that project dorsally beyond the epipterygoids.

The sphenethmoid sits dorsally to the parasphenoid and is a U-shaped ossification. The ascending lamina directly touches the frontal because of an extensive, overlapping suture.

=== Palate and Splanchnocranium ===
The holotype of Huskerpeton shows a mostly complete palate. The choana is surrounded by the premaxilla, vomer, palatine, and maxilla. The vomer has a short row of teeth and is shaped like a small, narrow triangle that sits anterior to the pterygoid. They contact each other medially in between the choanae. From the choana, the palatine-vomer suture extends posteriorly and is excluded from the subtemporal fossa. The palatine is sutured laterally to the maxilla and medially bordered by the pterygoid, which are the biggest parts of the palate. The interpterygoid vacuity, which is met anteriorly by the large, broad palatine rami of the pterygoids.

The supensorium articulates with the jaw in line with the occiput. The broad posterior surface of the quadrate is rostrally concave. The internal, trabecular medullary cavity is slightly triangular when viewed posteriorly and has a gentle dorsomedial curve. The quadrate has a trochlear condyle that allows articulation with the articular.

The epipterygoids are weakly ossified and articulate slightly with the pterygoid. They are both a part of the basicranial articulation. Just like in other recumbirostrans, the basiarticular process is excluded from the palatal surface by the epipterygoid.

=== Lower Jaw ===
The dentary is long and thin, and as it nears the symphysis, it narrows. It appears to have space for 18 teeth. The tooth row is interrupted posteriorly by a tall coronoid eminence that is made up of the dentary and posterior coronoid. The posterior coronoid does not have any teeth and has a high prominence that contacts the coronoid eminence of the dentary. The anterior coronoid spans the length of the dentary ramus and has a small row of five to six teeth. The angular is triangular and articulates with the quadrate. It does not have a retroarticular process.

=== Dentition ===
Like all recumbirostrans, the upper dental is posteriorly and medially inclined. It has simple, rounded, smooth-surfaced, unicuspid marginal teeth. The premaxilla has space for up to five teeth. The 16-18 teeth of the premaxilla are subequal in size, with the slightly larger teeth sitting anteriorly. The teeth decrease slightly in size, and then the tooth row ends just past the midpoint of the orbit.

== Paleobiology ==
As amphibians, Huskerpeton must have spent some part of their lifecycle in the water. There is possible evidence that Huskerpeton was also fossorial, however they only show some basic cranial adaptations to head-first burrowing. Conservative recumbirostrans are the first group to show consolidation of the occipital region, and they show evidence of early adaptation and diversification to the specific niche of fossorial lifestyles. In addition to a lack of cranial adaptations linking them to fossorial lifestyles, there was also no evidence of burrow structures uncovered at Mayer Farm. Because the only specimen of Huskerpeton to be discovered is a skull and jaw bones, it is difficult to discern their paleobiology beyond what is understood to be true for recumbirostrans in general.

== Paleoecology and Geology ==
The holotype of Huskerpeton englehorni was found at the Mayer Farm locality (DMNH loc. 2076, UNSM loc. Rh 103) of the Eskridge formation near Humbolt, Kansas. During the Early Permian, this region was categorized by a seasonal, slightly fluctuating climate between warm/dry and cold/wet conditions. This area also likely fluctuated between near-shore regressional and transgressional depositional environments based on the presence and composition of paleosols, mudstones, and limestones. The Mayer farm localities fossil-bearing limestones showed little to no evidence of soil formation, however the Rany Farm and Shot in the Dark Quarry localities had more developed limestones. The Mayer Farm locality is also hypothesized to represent a larger, more permanent body of water than the other two Eskridge localities. This region also supported greater diversity of small amphibians and microsaurs.
