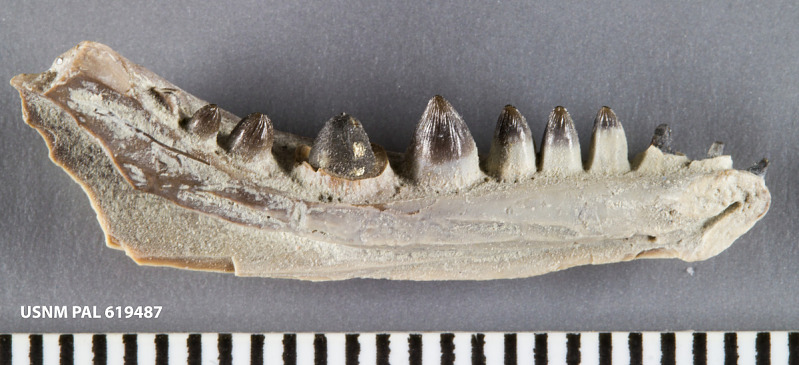
- Jaw

Scientific classification
- Domain: Eukaryota
- Kingdom: Animalia
- Phylum: Chordata
- Class: Reptilia
- Family: †Captorhinidae
- Genus: †Opisthodontosaurus; Reisz et al., 2015

Type species
- †Opisthodontosaurus carrolli Reisz et al., 2015

= Opisthodontosaurus =

Opisthodontosaurus Temporal range: Early Permian

Extinct genus of reptiles

Opisthodontosaurus is an extinct genus of captorhinid reptile from the Early Permian of Oklahoma. The type species Opisthodontosaurus carrolli was named in 2015 on the basis of several articulated skeletons from the Dolese Brothers Limestone Quarry near Richards Spur. Before the description of these skeletons, the jaws and teeth of Opisthodontosaurus carrolli were thought to belong to a species of lepospondyl amphibian called Euryodus primus. Although captorhinid reptiles and lepospondyl amphibians are distantly related, the two species show a remarkable degree of evolutionary convergence in their dental anatomy. Both were likely durophagous, eating hard-shelled invertebrates.
