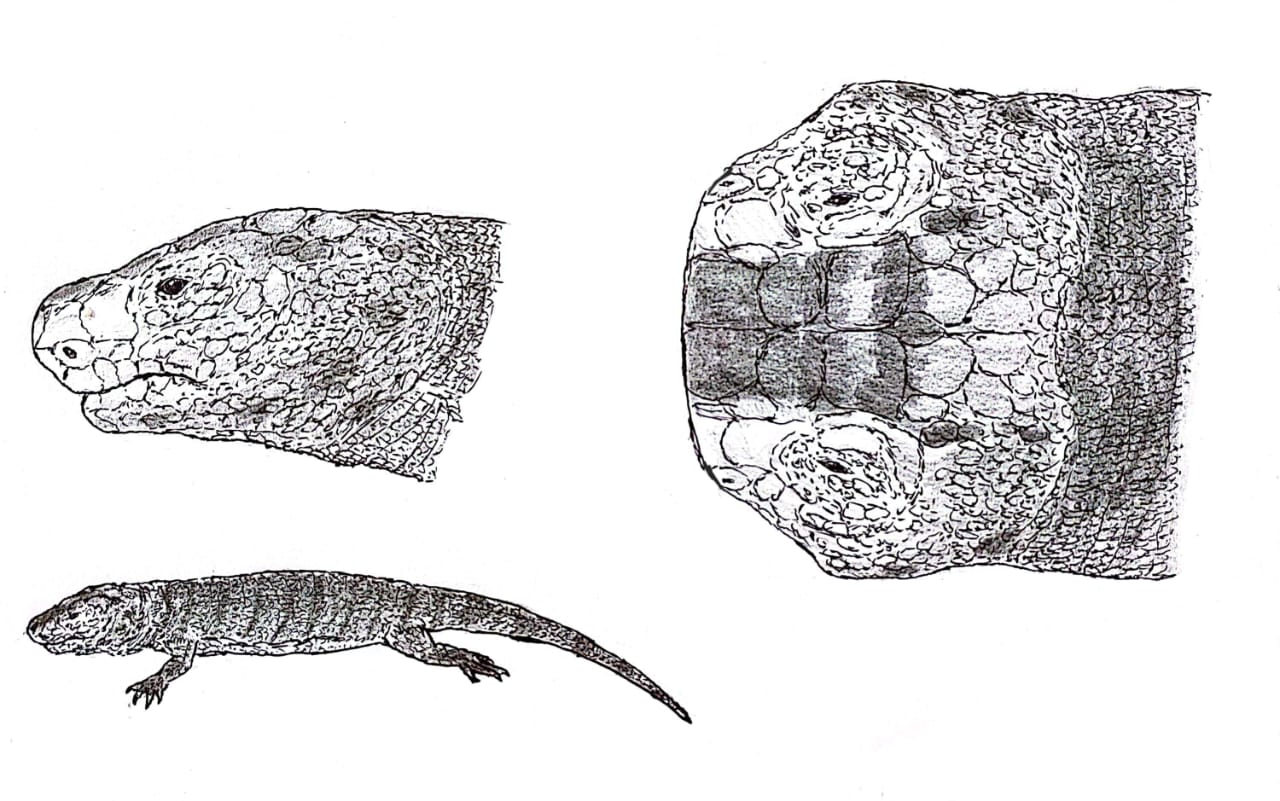
- Reconstruction of Quasicaecilia from different angles

Scientific classification
- Kingdom: Animalia
- Phylum: Chordata
- Family: †Brachystelechidae
- Genus: †Quasicaecilia; Carroll, 1990

Species
- Q. texana Carroll, 1990 (type)

= Quasicaecilia =

Quasicaecilia Temporal range: Early Permian

Extinct genus of tetrapods

Quasicaecilia is an extinct genus of microsaur. It is known from the Early Permian of Texas in the United States. A single specimen is known, collected from the Texas Permian redbeds by Charles Hazelius Sternberg in 1917. It was originally identified as a specimen of the gymnarthrid microsaur Cardiocephalus. The skull is small, less than 2 centimetres (0.79 in) in length, and the otic capsule (a hollow region of bone encapsulating the inner ear) is very large in comparison to the rest of the skull. The skull of Quasicaecilia superficially resembles those of extant but unrelated caecilians, hence the genus name. Quasicaecilia was assigned to the new family Brachystelechidae in 1991 along with the genera Batropetes and Carrolla.
