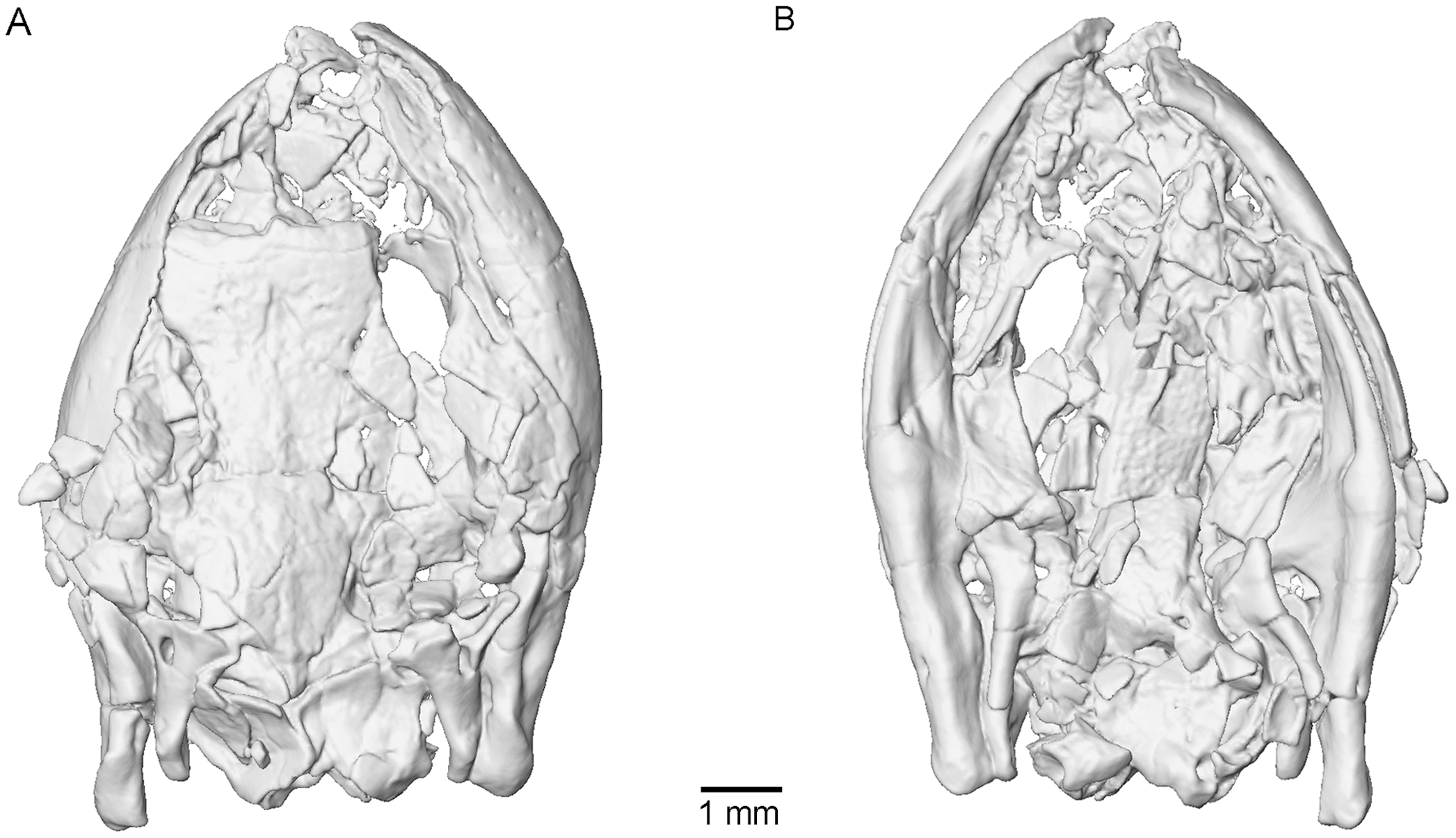
- 3D scan of the holotype skull

Scientific classification
- Kingdom: Animalia
- Phylum: Chordata
- Class: Amphibia
- Order: Gymnophiona
- Genus: †Eocaecilia; Jenkins & Walsh, 1993
- Species: †E. micropodia

Binomial name
- †Eocaecilia micropodia Jenkins & Walsh, 1993

= Eocaecilia =

Eocaecilia Temporal range: Early Jurassic, 199.6–175.6 Ma

Extinct genus of caecilians

Eocaecilia is an extinct genus of gymnophionan amphibian from the early Jurassic Kayenta Formation of Arizona, United States. One species is described, Eocaecilia micropodia.

Eocaecilia shared some characteristics with salamanders and the now extinct microsaur amphibians. It was of small size, about 15 cm in length. Unlike modern caecilians, which are legless, Eocaecilia possessed small legs, and while modern caecilians have poorly developed eyes and spend a lot of time under ground, Eocaecilia's eyes were somewhat better developed. Although the precise ancestry of Eocaecilia is debated (and other caecilians by extension), it likely resided among the ancestral lepospondyl or temnospondyl amphibians of the Paleozoic and Mesozoic.
