= Aletrimyti =

Aletrimyti Temporal range: Early Permian

Scientific classification
- Kingdom: Animalia
- Phylum: Chordata
- Clade: †Recumbirostra
- Genus: †Aletrimyti; Szostakiwskyj et al., 2015

Type species
- †Aletrimyti gaskillae Szostakiwskyj et al., 2015

Extinct genus of tetrapods

Aletrimyti is an extinct monotypic genus of recumbirostran tetrapod from the Early Permian of Oklahoma.

The type species Aletrimyti gaskillae was named in 2015 by Matt Szostakiwskyj, Jason D. Pardo and Jason S. Anderson.
