= Tambaroter =

Tambaroter Temporal range: Early Permian

Scientific classification
- Domain: Eukaryota
- Kingdom: Animalia
- Phylum: Chordata
- Family: †Ostodolepidae
- Genus: †Tambaroter; Henrici et al., 2011

Species
- †T. carrolli Henrici et al., 2011 (type)

Extinct genus of tetrapods

Tambaroter is an extinct genus of ostodolepid microsaur from the Early Permian of Germany. The type species T. carrolli was named in 2011. Tambaroter is known from a single skull found in the Tambach Formation, which is the lowermost unit of the Upper Rotliegend. It is the only vertebrate that has been found outside the Bromacker Quarry, the most productive locality of the formation. It is also the first ostodolepid known from outside North America.

Like other ostodolepids, Tambaroter has a pointed snout. Bones in the cheek region are indented upward, leaving a large gap in the bottom of the back of the skull. Tambaroter and other ostodolepids have prominent projections in the back of the lower jaws called retroarticular processes, which are not as well developed in other microsaurs.
