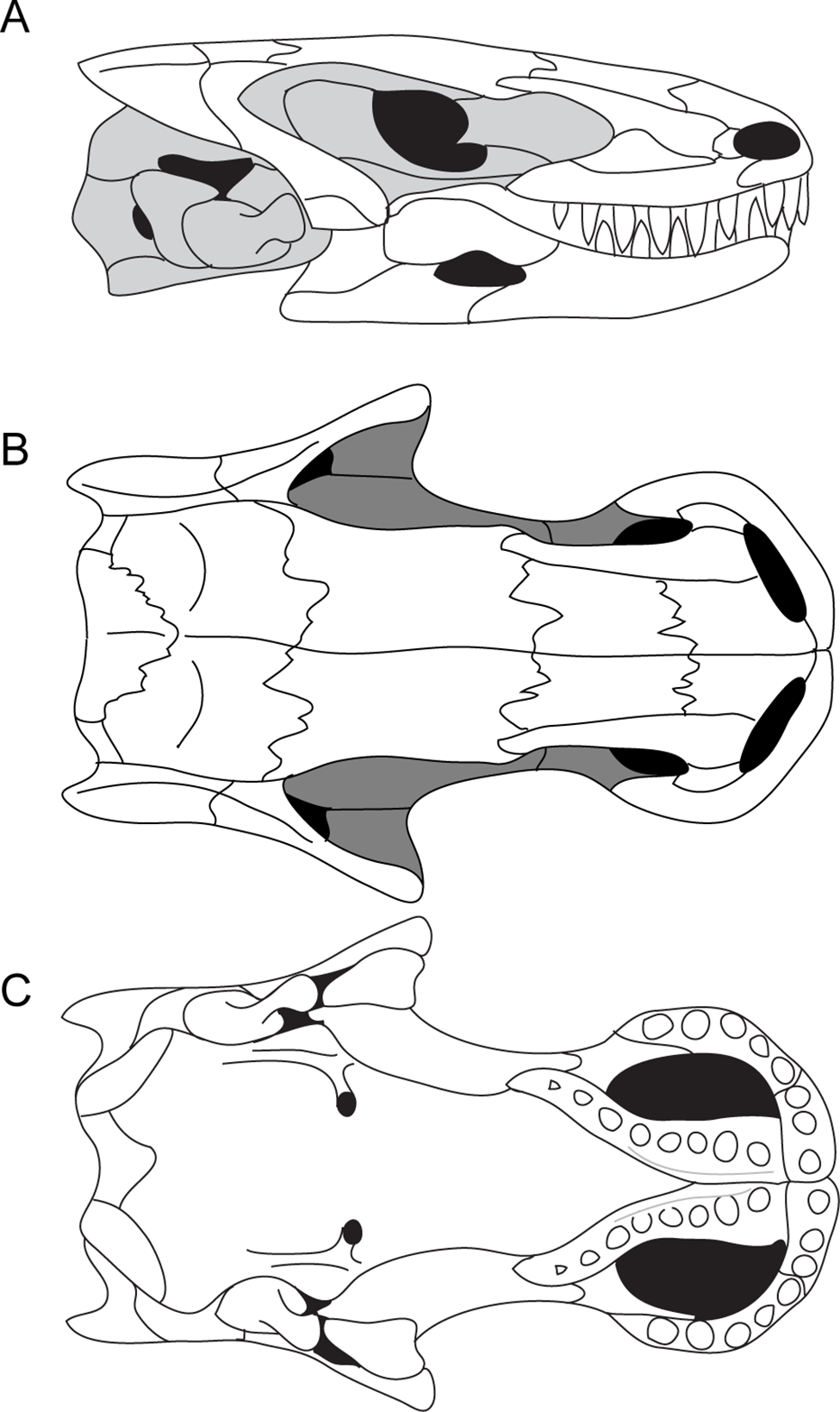
- Reconstructed skull of B. newberryi

Scientific classification
- Kingdom: Animalia
- Phylum: Chordata
- Order: †Lysorophia
- Family: †Molgophidae
- Genus: †Brachydectes; Cope, 1868

Type species
- †Brachydectes newberryi Cope, 1868

Synonyms
- Genus synonymy: †Cocytinus? Cope, 1871; †Lysorophus? Cope, 1877; †Molgophis? Cope, 1868; †Pleuroptyx? Cope, 1875; Species synonymy: †Brachydectes elongatus? Wellstead, 1991; †Cocytinus gyrinoides? Cope, 1871; †Lysorophus tricarinatus? Cope, 1877; †Molgophis brevicostatus? Cope, 1875; †Molgophis macrurus? Cope, 1868; †Pleuroptyx clavatus? Cope, 1875

= Brachydectes =

Brachydectes Temporal range: Carboniferous - Permian 323–274 Ma

Extinct genus of tetrapods

Brachydectes is an extinct genus of lysorophian tetrapods that lived from the Late Carboniferous to the Early Permian. It had a very small head and long body, B. elongatus had 1–2 centimetres (0.39–0.79 in) long skull (averagely 1.4 centimetres (0.55 in)) and pre-sacral length up to 150 centimetres (59 in) (averagely 45 centimetres (18 in)), while B. newberryi, which have proportionally larger skull than B. elongatus, for specimen with 7.6 millimetres (0.30 in) skull roof had estimated total length of 11 centimetres (4.3 in), while the largest skull exceeds 3 centimetres (1.2 in).
