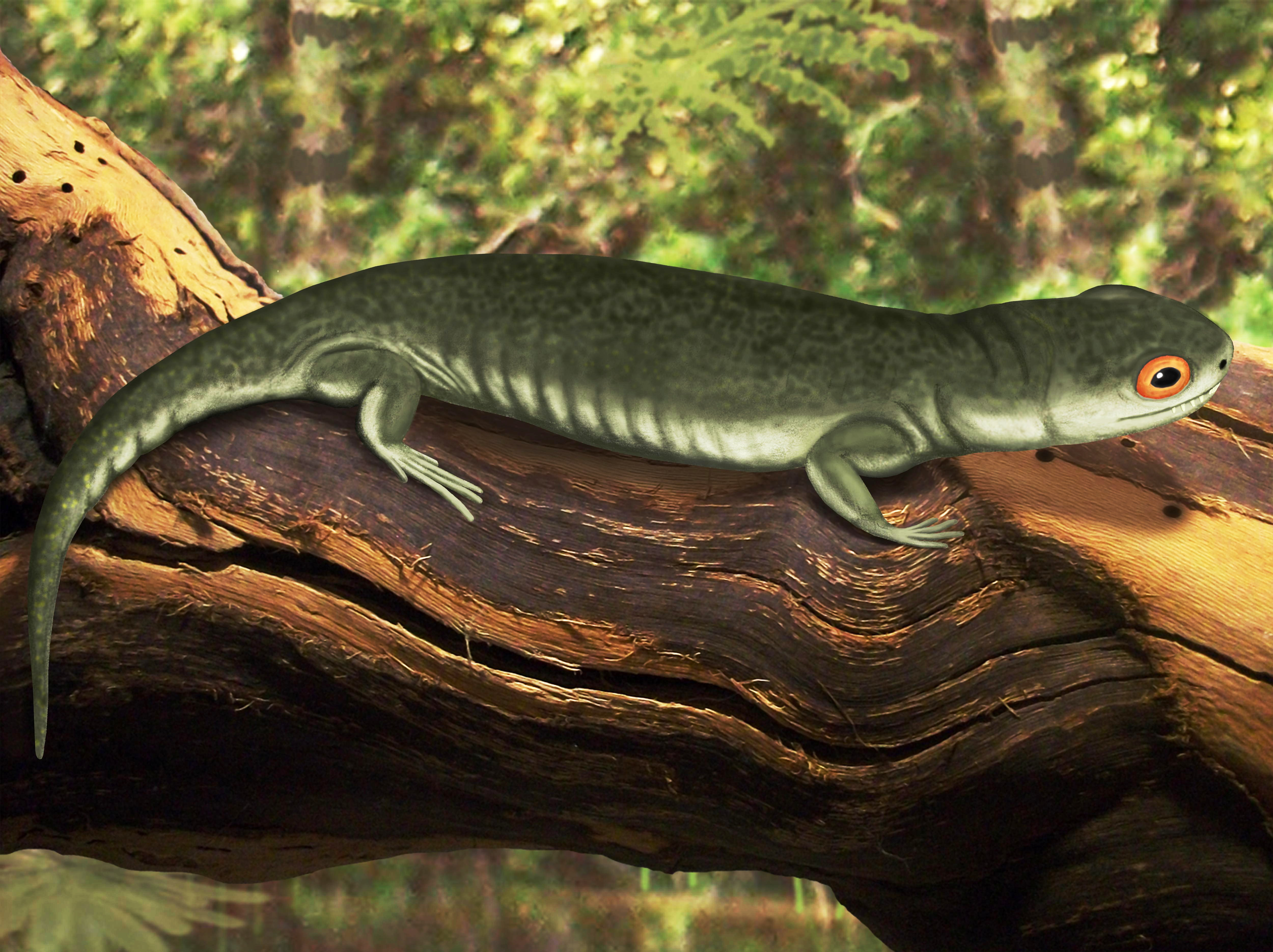
- Restoration of Batropetes fritschi
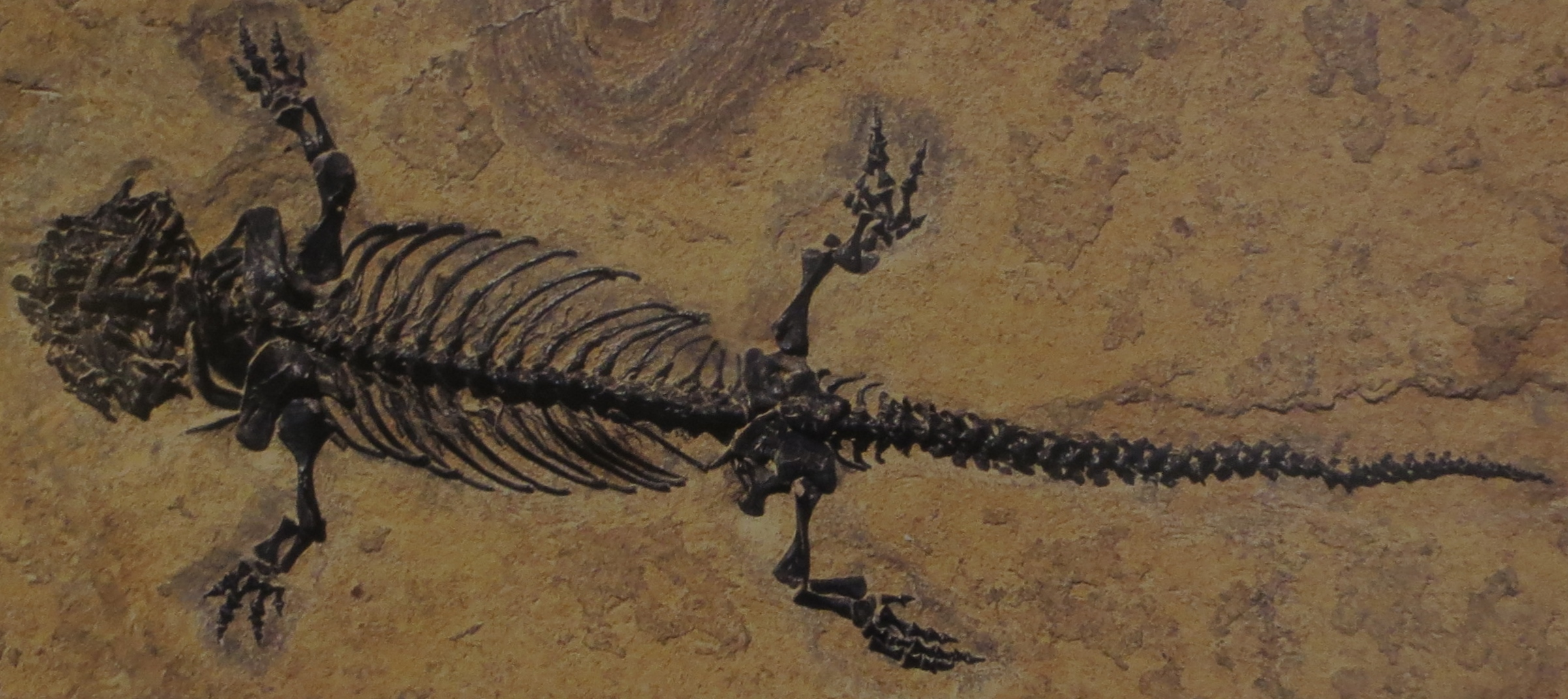
- B. palatinus holotype

Scientific classification
- Kingdom: Animalia
- Phylum: Chordata
- Family: †Brachystelechidae
- Genus: †Batropetes; Carroll and Gaskill, 1971

Species
- †B. appelensis Glienke, 2015 †B. fritschi Carroll, 1991 (type) †B. niederkirchensis Glienke, 2013 †B. palatinus Glienke, 2015

Synonyms
- Brachystelechus Carroll and Gaskill, 1978; Petrobates Credner, 1890

= Batropetes =

Batropetes Temporal range: Early Permian

Extinct genus of amphibians

Batropetes is an extinct genus of brachystelechid recumbirostran "microsaur". Batropetes lived during the Sakmarian stage^{[a]} of the Early Permian. Fossils attributable to the type species B. fritschi have been collected from the town of Freital in Saxony, Germany, near the city of Dresden. Additional material has been found from the Saar-Nahe Basin in southwestern Germany and has been assigned to three additional species: B. niederkirchensis, B. palatinus, and B. appelensis.

== Description ==
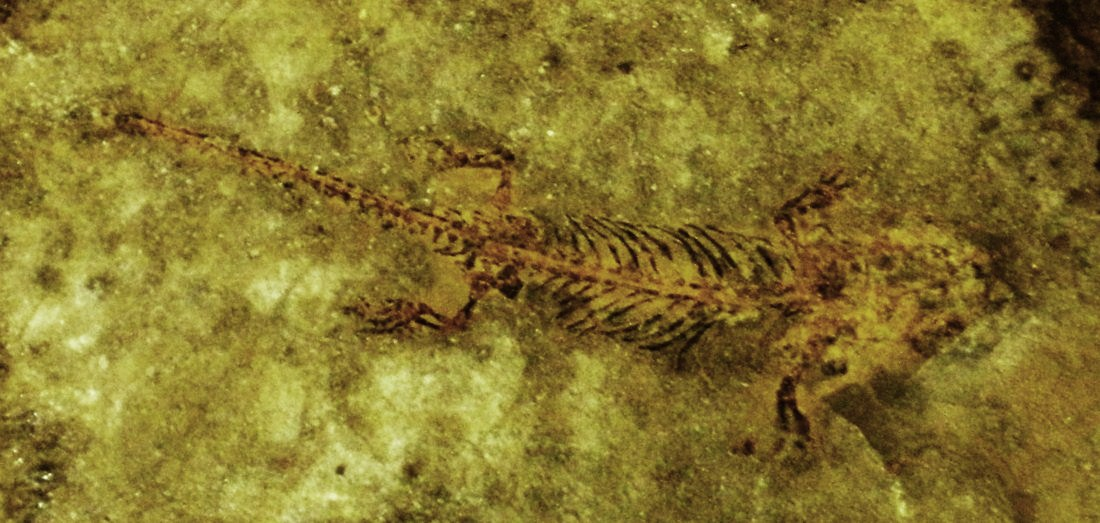
Fossil

Batropetes is small and short-bodied for a microsaur. Its average total body length was about 8 centimetres (3.1 in). The orbits are large and the skull is short. Batropetes possesses scales on its underside that are similar to those of reptiles.

Batropetes is distinguished from Carrolla, another brachystelechid microsaur, by the presence of three cusps on the premaxillary and anterior dentary teeth. In Carrolla, there are only two cusps. Additional diagnostic features seen in Batropetes include a supraoccipital bone that is not fused to the otic capsule, the presence of a retroarticular process (a projection at the back of the lower jaw), and two proximal bones in the tarsus.

== Classification ==
The first known material now attributed to the genus Batropetes was originally referred to the genus Hyloplesion in 1882. Several specimens from Freital were described under the name Hyloplesion Fritschi as small non-labyrinthodonts. Three years later, the specimens originally referred to as Hyloplesion Fritschi were reassigned by Carl Hermann Credner to the genus Hylonomus under the name Hylonomus fritschia.^{[b]} Newly discovered specimens of other forms from the same locality led Credner to believe that two taxa existed. He named one, an amphibian, Hylonomus geinitzi, and the other, a reptile, Petrobates truncatus.

Later preparation of the material examined by Credner through a technique of removing the soft bone from the surrounding matrix mechanically and casting the cavities in liquid latex has revealed more anatomical detail suggesting that three taxa were present in Freital, not two. A specimen previously referred to Petrobates truncatus was first considered by Robert L. Carroll and Pamela Gaskill in 1978 to be a microsaur rather than a reptile. It was considered distinct from Petrobates, then considered a captorhinomorph, based only on the structure of the atlas.

Of the three species represented in Frietal, Hylonomus geinitzi, as described by Credner, has since been reassigned to the microsaur genus Saxonerpeton, and Petrobates truncatus was designated as Batropetes truncatus by Carroll and Gaskill in 1971. Carroll and Gaskill still referred to B. truncatus as a captorhinomorph reptile.

Carroll and Gaskill described a new microsaur in 1978 from Frietal, which they called Brachystelechus fritschi. It was noted that the skull of Brachystelechus bore a striking resemblance to that of Batropetes, which was considered to be unrelated. It differed from Batropetes in that it possessed an internarial bone which was not seen in known specimens of Batropetes.

A newly discovered specimen of microsaur from the Saar-Nahe district in southwestern Germany has confirmed that Brachystelechus and Batropetes represent the same species. The characters that previously distinguished the two genera from one another are all found in one specimen, known as SMNS 55884, housed in the Staatliches Museum für Naturkunde Stuttgart. This a complete specimen preserved in ventral view and consisting of a part and counterpart. The skull roof was examined by excavating the matrix from the top of the block and exposing more anatomical features. The occipital condyle in SMNS 55884, not noticeable in the specimen of Brachystelechus, clearly indicates that it is a microsaur rather than a captorhinomorph reptile. An interfrontal bone is seen in material once referred to Brachystelechus but not in any material known from specimens previously attributed to Batropetes. This may be a result of poor preservation, or perhaps intraspecific variation. The parietals of the specimen are wide and the skull is short, both of which are features that associate it with the North American genera Carrolla and Quasicaecilia. On the basis of these and other similarities, Carroll, who described the new material in 1991, constructed a new microbrachomorph family called the Brachystelechidae to include Batropetes, Carrolla, and Quasicaecilia.

A 2013 study of Batropetes erected a new species, Batropetes niederkirchensis, for specimen SMNS 55884. SMNS 55884 was noted to differ from the type specimen of B. fritschi in the number of presacral vertebrae, the width between the eye sockets, the shape of the prefrontal, postorbital, and scapulocoracoid bones, and the position of the obturator foramen in the hips. Two additional species, B. appelensis and B. palatinus, were named in 2015 on the basis of new material found from the Saar-Nahe Basin.

== Notes ==
1. In European lithostratigraphy this is known as the Rotliegend.
2. Hylonomus is now known to be a genus of early reptile within the family Protorothyrididae.
