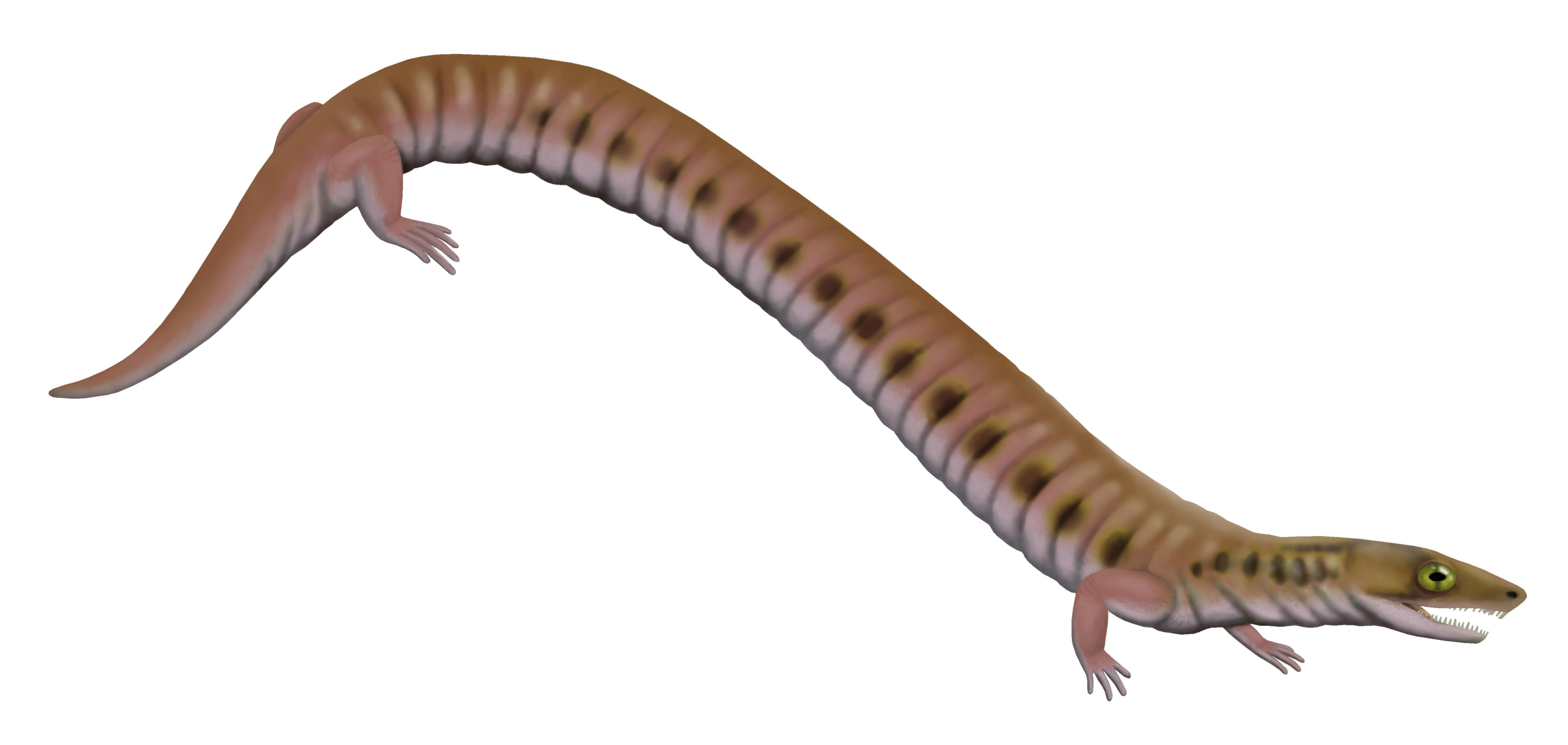

Scientific classification
- Kingdom: Animalia
- Phylum: Chordata
- Family: †Goniorhynchidae; Carroll and Gaskill, 1978
- Genus: †Rhynchonkos; Schulze and Foreman, 1981

Type species
- †Rhynchonkos stovalli (Olson, 1970) (originally Goniorhynchus stovalli)

Synonyms
- Goniorhynchus Olson, 1970

= Rhynchonkos =

Rhynchonkos Temporal range: Early Permian Cisuralian

Extinct genus of tetrapods

Rhynchonkos is an extinct genus of rhynchonkid microsaur. Originally known as Goniorhynchus, it was renamed in 1981 because the name had already been given to another genus; the family, likewise, was originally named Goniorhynchidae but renamed in 1988. The type and only known species is R. stovalli, found from the Early Permian Fairmont Shale in Cleveland County, Oklahoma. Rhynchonkos shares many similarities with Eocaecilia, an early caecilian from the Early Jurassic of Arizona. Similarities between Rhynchonkos and Eocaecilia have been taken as evidence that caecilians are descendants of microsaurs. However, such a relationship is no longer widely accepted.

== Description ==
Rhynchonkos has an elongated body with at least 37 presacral vertebrae. Most vertebrae have ribs. Unlike other microsaurs, the atlas of Rhynchonkos lacks ribs. Both Rhynchonkos and Euryodus have atlases that bear a strong resemblance to those of nectrideans. Like nectrideans, the arch of the atlas is attached to the centrum, although this is likely the result of convergence.

The skull is triangular in dorsal view. The limbs are very small. It has a pointed, overhanging snout that extends beyond the tooth row. There are five or six premaxillary teeth and sixteen maxillary teeth, all of which are narrow and peg-shaped. The palate also has teeth, with rows on the ectopterygoid, palatine, and vomer. The bones of the skull roof are similar to those of gymnarthrids. There are two rows of teeth adjacent to one another in the lower jaw, with a marginal row on the dentary and an inner row on the coronoid.

== Classification ==
Rhynchonkos was first described as Goniorhynchus by Olson (1970). However, the name Goniorhynchus was preoccupied by an Indian moth named in 1896. Because of this preoccupation, it was renamed Rhynchonkos by Schultze and Foreman (1981). Rhynchonkos was first described as a gymnarthrid, but was soon placed in its own family, which was at first called Goniorhynchidae. However, Goniorhynchidae was named before Rhynchonkos was given as a replacement name for the genus. Citing what is currently Article 39 of the International Code of Zoological Nomenclature, Zanon (1988) pointed out that if any family is to bear the name Goniorhynchidae, it must be based on the valid genus Goniorhynchus Hampson, 1896, not on the invalid Goniorhynchus Olson, 1970; he therefore coined the replacement name Rhynchonkidae, which has been used in some works.

=== Relationship to caecilians ===
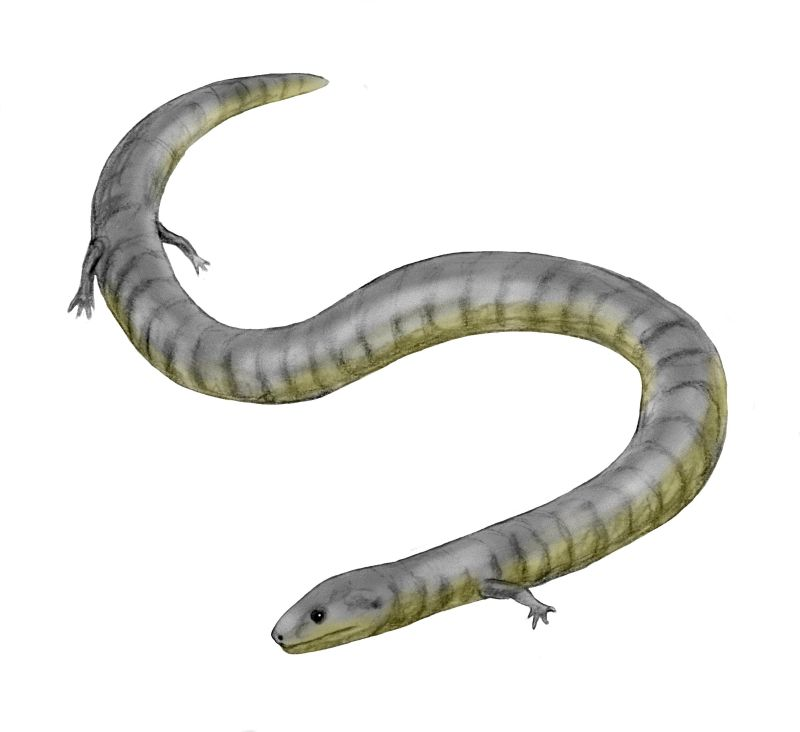
Eocaecilia micropodia, an early caecilian that shares many similarities with Rhynchonkos

Rhynchonkos shares many features with the early caecilian Eocaecilia, including an elongated snout, small limbs, and a similar skull. Based on these features, it has been suggested that caecilians originated from Rhynchonkos or another closely related microsaur. Carroll and Currie (1975), the first to suggest this possible relationship, noted similarities in temporal fenestration, palatal structure, braincase composition, and mandibular dentition. In the temporal region of the skulls of Rhynchonkos and caecilians, the number of bones is reduced. Both Rhynchonkos and caecilians possess a primitive combination of palatal bones, including the ectopterygoid. The two taxa also have rows of teeth on the palate in addition to the marginal rows on the maxilla and premaxilla. Carroll and Currie also mentioned that Rhynchonkos and caecilians have a pleurosphenoid that joins the otic-occipital portion of the braincase with the sphenethmoid, a characteristic which they considered unique among amphibians. The adjacent tooth rows on the coronoid and the dentary of Rhynchonkos were also considered a characteristic that linked it with caecilians.

Despite these similarities, many of the characteristics that suggested a close relationship between Rhynchonkos and caecilians have since been considered primitive, convergent, or indeterminate. For example, tooth rows on the palate have evolved multiple times independently in early amphibians. The general appearance of Rhynchonkos is similar to that of caecilians, but is also similar to other amphibians that have independently developed elongated bodies. Adelospondyls, lysorophians, aïstopods, and some salamanders all have an increased number of vertebrae that lengthen the body. Reduced limbs are seen in many aquatic or burrowing amphibians, and are not unique to microsaurs and caecilians.
