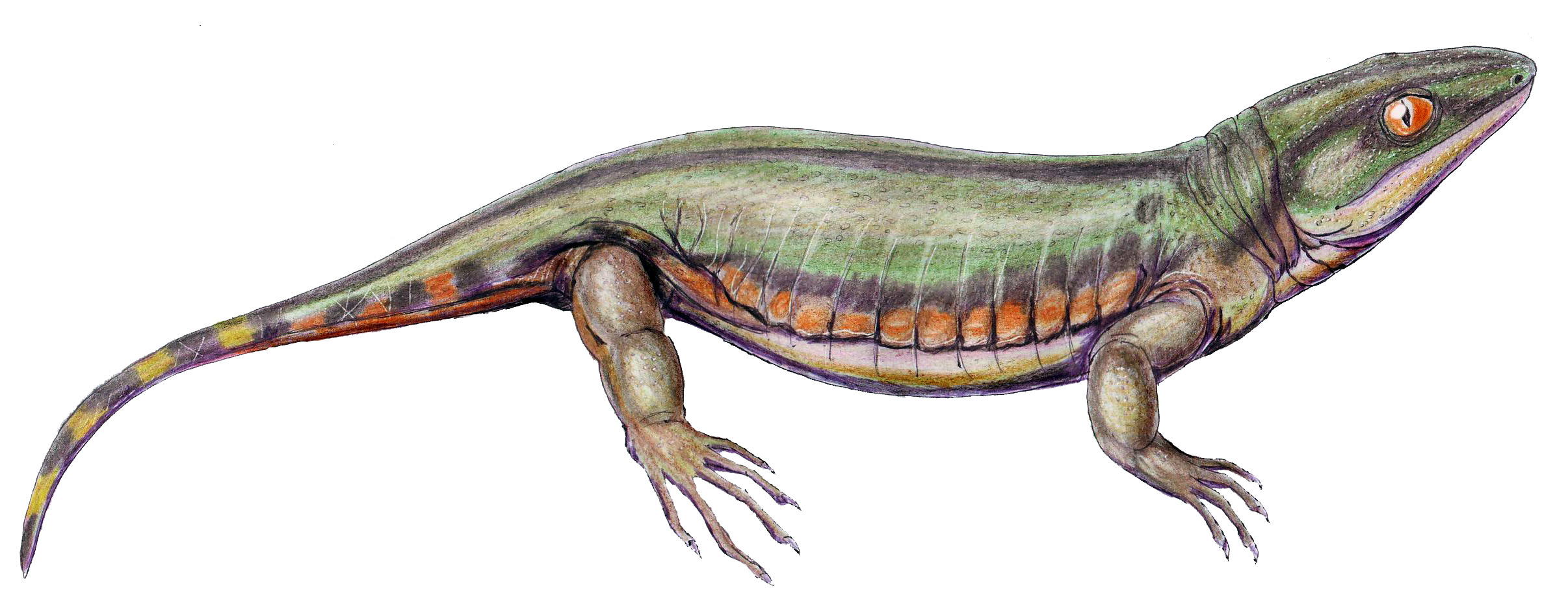
- Tuditanus punctulatus

Scientific classification
- Kingdom: Animalia
- Phylum: Chordata
- Clade: †Microsauria
- Suborder: †Tuditanomorpha; Carroll and Gaskill, 1978

Families
- Goniorhynchidae; Hapsidopareiidae; Trihecatontidae; Tuditanidae

= Tuditanomorpha =

Tuditanomorpha Temporal range: Late Carboniferous—Early Permian

Extinct suborder of tetrapods

Tuditanomorpha is a suborder of microsaur tetrapods. Tuditanomorphs lived from the Late Carboniferous to the Early Permian and are known from North America and Europe. Tuditanomorphs have a similar pattern of bones in the skull roof. Tuditanomorphs display considerable variability, especially in body size, proportions, dentition, and presacral vertebral count. Currently there are four families of tuditanomorphs, with two being monotypic. Tuditanids first appear in the Lower Pennsylvanian. Goniorhynchidae, Hapsidopareiidae, and Trihecatontidae appear in the Late Pennsylvanian and Early Permian.

Gymnarthrids, pantylids, and Ostodolepidae, originally considered in the Tuditanomorpha, were later placed in the group Recumbirostra. Asaphestra, previously thought to be the member of Tuditanomorpha, was reclassified as primitive synapsid in 2020 then as a dubious recumbirostran in 2025.

== Classification ==
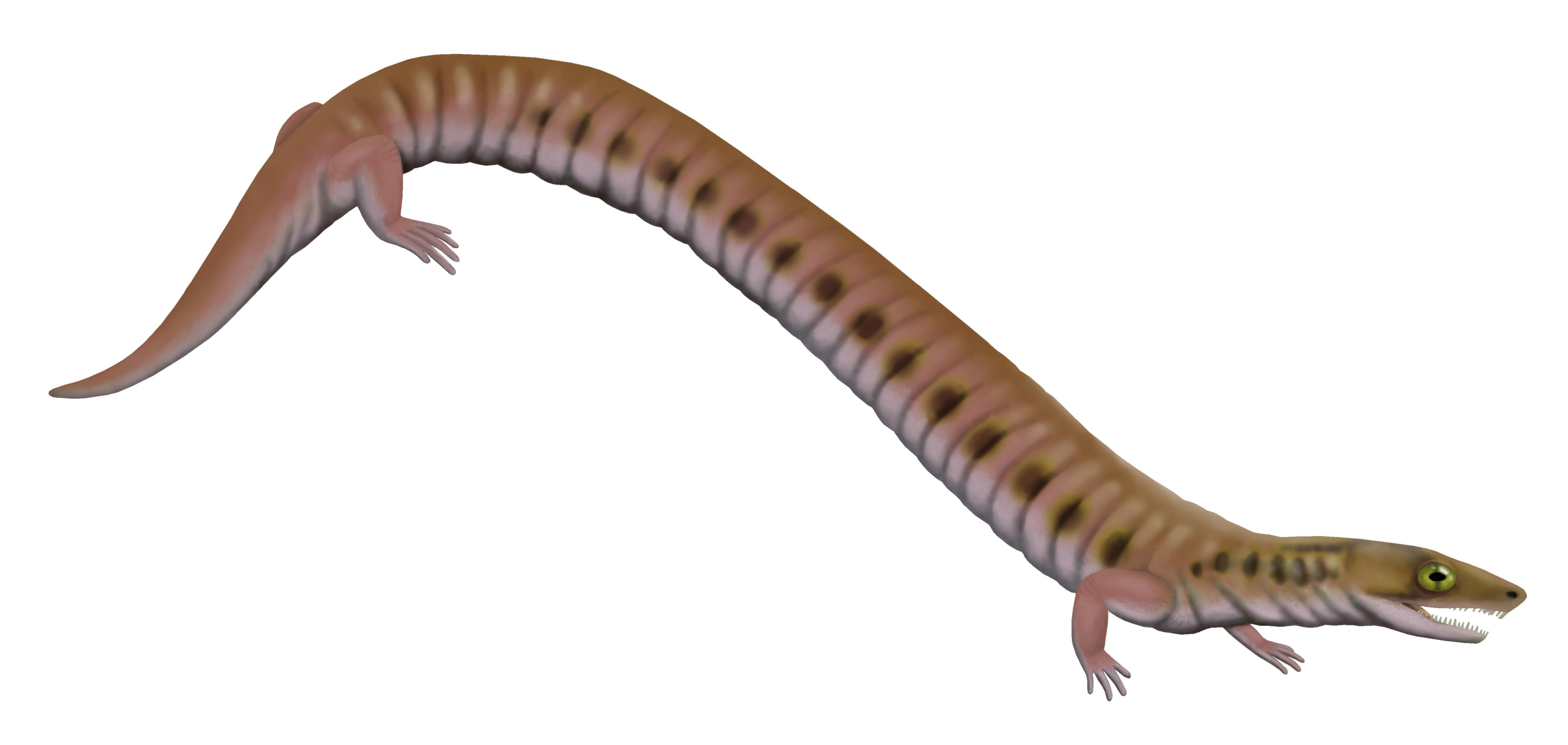
Rhynchonkos stovalli

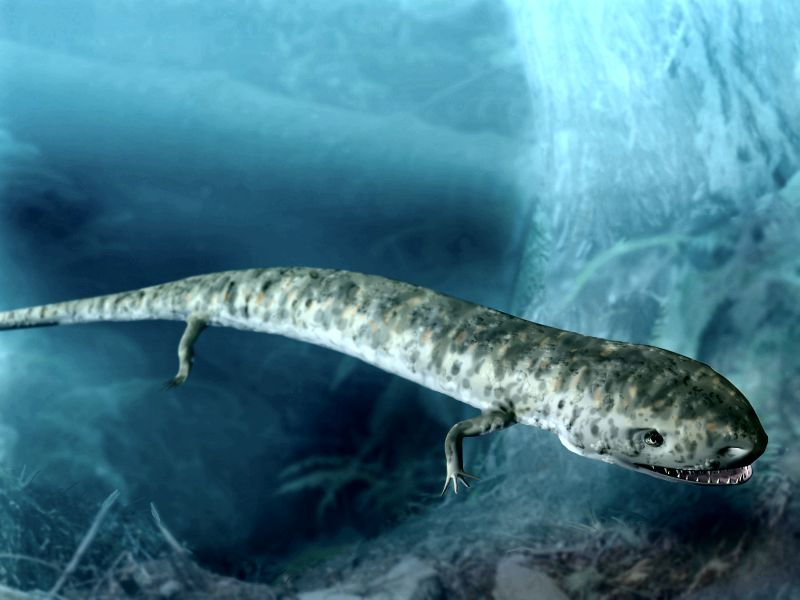
Cardiocephalus peabodyi

Suborder Tuditanomorpha

- Family Goniorhynchidae
  - Rhynchonkos
- Family Hapsidopareiidae
  - Hapsidopareion
  - Llistrofus
  - Ricnodon
  - Saxonerpeton
- Family Trihecatontidae
  - Trihecaton
- Family Tuditanidae
  - Boii
  - Crinodon
  - Tuditanus
