= Pariotichus =

Scientific classification
- Domain: Eukaryota
- Kingdom: Animalia
- Phylum: Chordata
- Family: †Gymnarthridae
- Genus: †Pariotichus; Cope, 1878

Extinct genus of amphibians

Pariotichus is an extinct genus of gymnarthrid microsaurs from the early Permian of Texas.

== History of study ==
Pariotichus was collected by Jacob Boll from the Wichita Group of Texas in 1878 and described by American paleontologist Edward Drinker Cope in the same year. It is one of the first 'microsaurs' to be described from North America. The type species is Pariotichus brachyops, which remains the only presently recognized species of the genus. Other species of Pariotichus were described, mostly by Cope, that have subsequently been identified as captorhinomorph reptiles (including the well-known Captorhinus aguti) and were reassigned by Case (1911). One other species, "Pariotichus megalops" is a junior synonym of the dvinosaur temnospondyl Isodectes obtusus. The osteology and relationships of P. brachyops were subsequently reviewed by Gregory et al. (1956) and Carroll & Gaskill (1978).

== Anatomy ==
The holotype and only specimen of Pariotichus is a partial skull currently reposited at the American Museum of Natural History. The relatively poor preservation has complicated attempts to properly characterize its anatomy relative to other early Permian gymnarthrids from Texas, particularly the smaller Cardiocephalus and the larger Euryodus. General attributes of the skull such as proportions and dental morphology conform to those of other gymnarthrids. The most recent revision by Carroll & Gaskill (1978) did not present a diagnosis for the genus or species. The stratigraphic occurrence in the Wichita Group precedes that of Cardiocephalus and Euryodus in the Clear Fork Group.

== Relationships ==
Pariotichus has rarely been included in phylogenetic analyses but is usually recovered as a gymnarthrid. Below are the results of the analysis by Huttenlocker et al. (2013):

- - - Microbrachis
  - - Asaphestera
    - - Tuditanus
      - - - Hapsidopareion
          - Saxonerpeton
        - Recumbirostra
          - - - Pantylus
              - Stegotretus
            - - - Carrolla
                - Batropetes
              - - Rhynchonkos
                - Eocaecilia
          - - Nannaroter
            - - Pelodosotis
              - Micraroter
            - - - Proxilodon bonneri
                - - Tambaroter
                  - Huskerpeton englehorni
              - Gymnarthridae
                - Pariotichus
                - - Euryodus dalyae
                  - Euryodus primus
                - - Cardiocephalus sternbergi
                  - Cardiocephalus peabodyi

== See also ==
- Prehistoric amphibian
- List of prehistoric amphibians
