= Kirktonecta =

Kirktonecta Temporal range: Early Carboniferous, 333–328.3 Ma

Scientific classification
- Domain: Eukaryota
- Kingdom: Animalia
- Phylum: Chordata
- Genus: †Kirktonecta; Clack, 2011
- Species: †K. milnerae

Binomial name
- †Kirktonecta milnerae Clack, 2011

Extinct genus of tetrapods

Kirktonecta is an extinct genus of microsaur known from the Carboniferous of West Lothian, Scotland.

== Discovery ==
Kirktonecta is known from the holotype specimen UMZC 2002, a and b, an almost complete skeleton including the skull, and preserved evidence for soft tissues, in part (slab a) and counterpart (slab b). The holotype was collected in the East Kirkton Quarry, near Bathgate of West Lothian, from "Bed 82" East Kirkton Limestone of the Bathgate Hills Volcanic Formation, dating to the Brigantian substage, of the late Viséan stage, of the Dinantian series (Early Carboniferous), about 333–328.3 million years ago. It represents the first microsaur to be discovered in the United Kingdom and the earliest occurrence of a microsaur in the fossil record. The next oldest being Utaherpeton and an unnamed taxon from the Chesterian of Goreville, Illinois.

== Description ==
Kirktonecta is diagnosed by the following autapomorphies: "deep tail, comprised of long, posteriorly directed, round-ended haemal spines in contact along their anterior and posterior margins distally, combined with low rounded neural spines; large pes, with tarsus breadth equivalent to the length of 3.5 or 4 presacral vertebrae." Jennifer A. Clack, who named this genus, found it to be most closely related to basal microsaurs, such as Asaphestera, Saxonerpeton, Hyloplesion and Llistrofus.

== Etymology ==
Kirktonecta was first named by Jennifer A. Clack in 2011 and the type species is Kirktonecta milnerae. The generic name is derived from the name of the East Kirkton Quarry, where the holotype was found, and Greek necta, "swimmer". The specific name honours the paleontologist Angela C. Milner.
