= Robert L. Carroll =

American–Canadian paleontologist (1938–2020)

Bob Carroll CM FRSC
- Born: Robert Lynn Carroll; May 5, 1938; Kalamazoo, Michigan, U.S.
- Died: April 7, 2020 (aged 81); Westmount, Quebec, Canada
- Citizenship: American; Canadian
- Education: Michigan State University; Harvard University
- Awards: Order of Canada (2019); Romer-Simpson Medal (2004); Willet G. Miller Medal (2001); Charles Schuchert Award (1978)
- Scientific career
- Fields: Paleontology
- Workplaces: McGill University
- Doctoral advisor: Alfred Sherwood Romer
- Doctoral students: Philip J. Currie; Robert R. Reisz

Robert "Bob" Lynn Carroll CM FRSC (May 5, 1938 – April 7, 2020) was an American–Canadian vertebrate paleontologist who specialised in Paleozoic and Mesozoic amphibians and reptiles.

== Biography ==
Carroll was an only child and grew up on a farm near Lansing, Michigan. He was introduced to paleontology by his father shortly after his fifth birthday, and by the time he was eight he had decided he wanted to be a vertebrate paleontologist. In that same year he received as a Christmas present the left femur of an Allosaurus, courtesy of Edwin H. Colbert, whom his father had told about his interest. In his teen years his parents took him on many fossil hunting trips to Wyoming and South Dakota.

After high-school, he went to Michigan State University, where he received a B.Sc. in 1959, majoring in Geology. From there he went to Harvard University where he studied biology and palaeontology under Alfred Sherwood Romer for his M.A. (1961) and Ph.D. degrees (1963); Carroll was Romer's last student. His doctoral thesis dealt with what is now known as Dissorophoidea, a group of Paleozoic amphibians that are often considered the closest relatives of present day amphibians, although they may also be stem-tetrapods if lissamphibians instead arose from within Lepospondyli.

After obtaining his Ph.D., Carroll held a National Research Council (NRC) postdoctoral fellowship at Redpath Museum at McGill University in Montreal (1962-1963), and then a National Science Foundation (NSF) postdoctoral position at the Natural History Museum in London. During this time, he studied tetrapod remains from the Pennsylvanian lycopod "tree stumps" at Joggins, Nova Scotia (a variety of temnospondyls, microsaurs, and basal amniotes). Most of this material was collected and first studied by Sir William Dawson, the first Principal of McGill University, in the nineteenth century.

Returning from London, in 1964 Carroll joined the permanent staff of McGill University as curator of geology at the Redpath Museum and became the curator of vertebrate paleontology the following year. At McGill, he was an assistant professor of zoology from 1964 to 1969, an associate professor of biology from 1969-1974, a full professor from 1974 onwards, and was appointed Strathcona Professor of Zoology in 1987. From 1985 to 1991 he was director of the Redpath Museum. He was an active professor until 2003, after which he was an emeritus professor.

Carroll died on April 7, 2020, at the St. Margaret Residential Centre in Westmount, Quebec, of complications from COVID-19. He suffered from Alzheimer in his last years. He was survived by his wife, Anna Di Turi, a retired business school teacher, and his one child, David, and granddaughter Juliette.

== Scientific research ==
Carroll was a prolific publisher and studied numerous major topics within paleontology and vertebrate evolution. He is best known for his work addressing the origins and early evolution of amphibians and reptiles and published extensively on lepospondyls, which have been variably considered as ancestors of amphibians or early reptiles. In a related vein, he also published numerous summary articles examining the evolution of tetrapods on land. He is also well published on marine reptiles.

He also published a number of books, including Vertebrate Paleontology and Evolution (1988), which remains a seminal textbook, Patterns and Processes of Vertebrate Evolution (1997), and The Rise of Amphibians: 365 Million Years of Evolution (2009). He coauthored another textbook, Paleontology (1998), and a volume of the Encyclopedia of Paleoherpetology on lepospondyls (1998). He also edited a volume of the Amphibian Biology series on the evolutionary history of amphibians (2000).

Carroll contributed to naming an extensive number of new species, outlined below:

Year	Taxon	Authors
1991	Utaherpeton franklini gen. et sp. nov.	Carroll, Bybee, & Tidwell
1990	Quasicaecilia texensis gen. et sp. nov.	Carroll
1982	Lacertulus bipes gen. et sp. nov.	Carroll & Thompson
1981	Claudiosaurus germaini gen. et sp. nov.	Carroll
1978	Cardiocephalus peabodyi sp. nov.	Carroll & Gaskill
1978	Crinodon gen. nov.	Carroll & Gaskill
1978	Euryodus dalyae sp. nov.	Carroll & Gaskill
1978	Llistrofus pricei gen. et sp. nov.	Carroll & Gaskill
1978	Pelodosotis elongatus gen. et sp. nov.	Carroll & Gaskill
1978	Saxonerpeton gen. nov.	Carroll & Gaskill
1977	Kenyasaurus mariakaniensis gen. et sp. nov.	Harris & Carroll
1973	Protocaptorhinus pricei gen. et sp. nov.	Clark & Carroll
1973	Romeria prima sp. nov.	Clark & Carroll
1969	Paleothyris acadiana gen. et sp. nov.	Carroll
1967	Adelospondylus watsoni gen. et sp. nov.	Carroll
1967	Limnostygis relictus gen. et sp. nov.	Carroll
1967	Romeriscus periallus gen. et sp. nov.	Baird & Carroll
1964	Broiliellus brevis sp. nov.	Carroll
1964	Brevidorsum profundum gen. et sp. nov.	Carroll
1964	Dissorophus angustus sp. nov. (now Diploseira angusta)	Carroll
1964	Conjunctio multidens gen. et sp. nov.	Carroll
1964	Parioxys bolli sp. nov.	Carroll

Several taxa are named after Carroll, including the teleost fish Mahengecharax carrolli, the 'microsaurs' Bolterpeton carrolli (now a synonym of the parareptile Delorhynchus) and Carrolla craddocki, and the captorhinid Opisthodontosaurus carrolli. He was honored with a festschrift in 2003.

Carroll was awarded a large number of awards, including the Charles Schuchert Award of the Paleontological Society (1978), of which he was one of the first recipients, the Elkanah Billings Medal of the Geological Association of Canada (1991), the Willet G. Miller Medal of the Royal Society of Canada (2001), of which he was made an honorary member in 1993, and the Romer-Simpson Medal of the Society of Vertebrate Paleontology (2004), the society's most prestigious honor, and was appointed a member of the Order of Canada (2019). Carroll also served as the president of the Society of Vertebrate Paleontology from 1982 to 1983. The Canadian Society of Vertebrate Paleontology's Carroll Prize is named after Carroll.

Carroll is often credited with being the "father of Canadian vertebrate paleontology" because many contemporary Canadian paleontologists can trace their graduate training back to him. Carroll supervised numerous graduate students, many of whom went on to lead their own successful research labs, including Jason Anderson (University of Calgary), Michael Caldwell (University of Alberta), Philip Currie (University of Alberta), and Robert Reisz (University of Toronto).
