= Elfridia =

Scientific classification
- Kingdom: Animalia
- Phylum: Chordata
- Family: †Gymnarthridae
- Genus: †Elfridia; Thayer, 1985

Type species
- †Elfridia bulbidens Thayer, 1985

Extinct genus of tetrapods

Elfridia is a poorly known extinct genus of microsaur in the family Gymnarthridae.

== History of study ==
Elfridia was named in 1985 by American paleontologist David Thayer based on material collected from Carboniferous exposures of the Swisshelm Mountains in Arizona. The genus name is derived from the nearby town of Elfridia, and the species name, E. bulbidens, is with respect to the bulbous teeth of the animal (bulbi- for 'bulbous' and -dens for 'tooth'). It is one of the oldest known 'microsaurs' and one of the few from the American southwest region.

== Anatomy ==
The holotype of Elfridia is a left mandible. Several other tooth-bearing fragments and isolated postcranial elements are assigned to this taxon. It is diagnosed by having lingually recurved tips of the teeth that are positioned asymmetrically on the labial portion. There are nine to ten teeth on the mandible with a greatly enlarged tooth along the mid-length of the tooth row.

== Relationships ==
Thayer placed Elridia within the Gymnarthridae, but the fragmentary nature of the material has precluded its incorporation into a phylogenetic analysis to more thoroughly test and to evaluate its relationships with other 'microsaurs.' He compared it to both Euryodus and Cardiocephalus, noting a mixture of features shared between the two gymnarthrids, such as the enlarged tooth (shared with Euryodus primus) and striations on the teeth (shared with Cardiocephalus).
