= Ostodolepis =

Ostodolepis Temporal range: Permian, 279.5–272.5 Ma

Scientific classification
- Kingdom: Animalia
- Phylum: Chordata
- Family: †Ostodolepidae
- Genus: †Ostodolepis; Williston, 1913

Extinct genus of tetrapods

Ostodolepis is an extinct genus of microsaurian tetrapods within the family Ostodolepidae. It is known from the Arroyo Formation in Texas.

== History of study ==
The holotype of Ostodolepis was discovered in 1909 by American paleontologist S.W. Williston in Willsbarger County, Texas. It was formally described in 1913. A second, more complete specimen was reported by Case (1929), purportedly from the same locality as the holotype, that is now the holotype of Pelodosotis elongatum. A third specimen (BPI 3839) was collected in 1965 by Kitching from the same locality as Case's specimen but is regarded as being more likely to belong to Micraroter erythrogeios. The name Ostodolepis brevispinatus is thus restricted to the holotype, which is currently reposited at the Field Museum of Natural History. Ostodolepis is from Greek ost-ōdēs ‘bone-like’ and lepís ‘scale, husk, shell’.

== Anatomy ==
The holotype of Ostodolepis is represented only by seven vertebrae and their associated ribs and scales. They generally differ little from those of other 'microsaurs' except with respect to proportions and the distinctiveness of the suture between the neural arch and the centrum. Carroll & Gaskill (1978) reported an alternation in height of the neural spines that differentiates it from BPI 3839.

== Relationships ==
The incompleteness of the holotype and the fact that it is probably not diagnostic preclude any testing of the relationships of Ostodolepis in a phylogenetic matrix. As the namesake for the family, Ostodolepidae, its placement is based largely on the similarity in overlapping skeletal regions with better known ostodolepids such as Pelodosotis.
