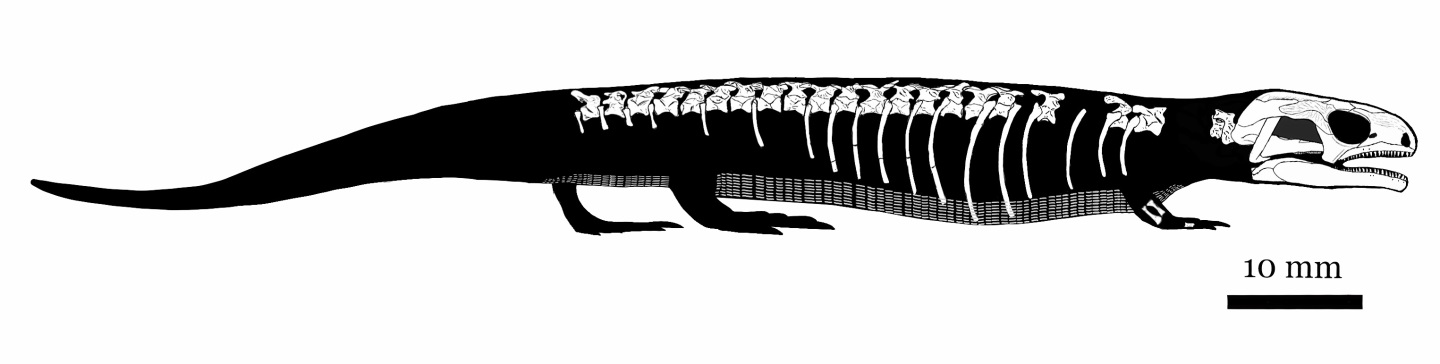
- Reconstructed skeleton

Scientific classification
- Kingdom: Animalia
- Phylum: Chordata
- Clade: †Microsauria
- Family: †Hapsidopareiidae
- Genus: †Llistrofus; Carroll & Gaskill, 1978

Type species
- Llistrofus pricei Carroll & Gaskill, 1978

= Llistrofus =

Llistrofus Temporal range: Permian (Artinskian), 289–286 Ma

Extinct genus of recumbirostrans

Llistrofus is an extinct genus of early Permian microsaur within the family Hapsidopareiidae that is known from Oklahoma. It may be a junior synonym and more mature form of the coeval Hapsidopareion.

== Discovery ==
Llistrofus was described by Canadian paleontologists Robert Carroll and Pamela Gaskill in 1978. The genus name is an anagram of Fort Sill, the historic name of the Richards Spur locality from which material of Llistrofus was collected. The species name, L. pricei, is given for the Brazilian paleontologist Llewellyn Price. The holotype of this taxon is currently reposited at the Field Museum of Natural History. The skull of the holotype was reappraised by Bolt & Rieppel in 2009. New material from Richards Spur was described by Gee et al. (2019).

== Description ==
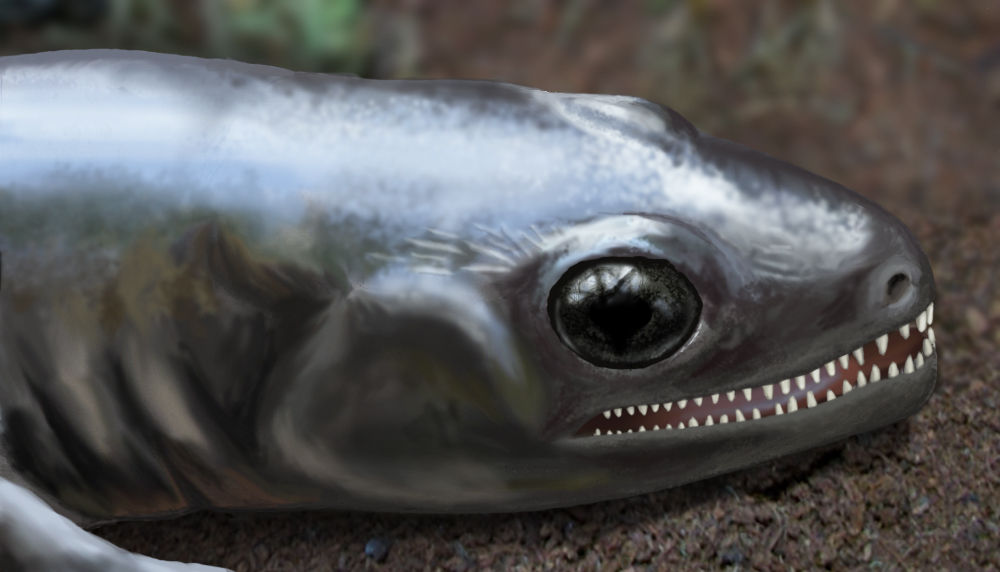
Speculative life restoration

Llistrofus is readily identified by the presence of a large temporal emargination, a feature shared with Hapsidopareion lepton that unites the Hapsidopareiidae. Carroll & Gaskill (1978) differentiated Llistrofus from Hapsidopareion by four features: (1) postorbital contacting the tabular; (2) postparietal contacting the squamosal; (3) frontals entering the orbit; and (4) presence of a quadratojugal. Bolt & Rieppel (2009) revised the diagnosis following additional preparation of the holotype's skull and list three features (only one of which is shared with the previous work): (1) skull length approximately twice that of Hapsidopareion; (2) frontals entering the orbit; and (3) cultriform process of the parasphenoid offset from the basal plate by a narrow base. Gee et al. (2019) further revised the diagnosis based on additional material from Richards Spur and listed 11 features: (1) frontals entering the orbit; (2) prefrontal entering the naris; (3) premaxilla contributing to ventral narial margin; (4) postfrontal excluded from the temporal emargination; (5) postorbital contacting the tabular; (6) denticles on the vomer; (7) teeth on the palatine smaller than the marginal teeth; (8) absence of a pterygoid-premaxilla contact; (9) a splenial that contributes to the symphysis; (10) presence of a Meckelian foramen; and (11) presence of a retroarticular process. Using high-resolution micro-CT scans of three skulls of the coeval Hapsidopareion, Jenkins et al. (2025) identified that the characters used to distinguish Llistrofus from it are actually shared by both taxa. Due to its larger size, they identified Llistrofus as representing a more mature ontogenetic stage of Hapsidopareion, and argued that the former should be regarded as a junior synonym of the latter.

== Classification ==
Llistrofus is recovered as the sister taxon to Hapsidopareion in phylogenetic analyses, forming the family Hapsidopareiidae within the Recumbirostra. In their 2025 publication, Jenkins et al. discussed the possible synonymy of Hapsidopareion and Llistrofus. The results of their phylogenetic analyses are displayed in the cladogram below, where they found recumbirostrans to be a clade along the amniote stem:

- - - Limnoscelis
    - - Captorhinidae
      - - Protorothyris
        - Amniota
  - Recumbirostra
    - Pantylus
    - - - - Hapsidopareion (including Llistrofus)
          - Odonterpetidae
        - Chthonosauria
          - Molgophidae
          - Brachystelechidae
      - Nastrondormes
        - - Huskerpeton
          - Proxilodon
        - - Gymnarthridae
          - - Rhynchonkidae
            - Ostodolepididae

== See also ==
- Prehistoric amphibian
- List of prehistoric amphibians
