= Hapsidopareion =

Hapsidopareion Temporal range: Permian, Artinskian

Scientific classification
- Kingdom: Animalia
- Phylum: Chordata
- Clade: †Microsauria
- Family: †Hapsidopareiidae
- Genus: †Hapsidopareion; Daly, 1973

Species
- †Hapsidopareion lepton Daly, 1973

Synonyms
- Llistrofus pricei? (Carroll & Gaskill, 1978)

Extinct genus of recumbirostrans

Hapsidopareion is an extinct genus of microsaur belonging to the family Hapsidopareiidae. Fossils have been found in the early Permian of Oklahoma.

== History of study ==
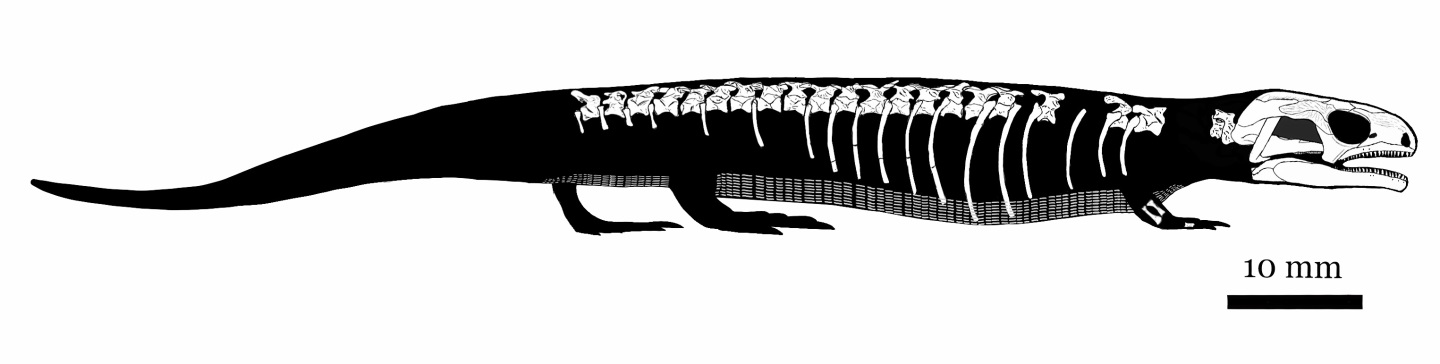
Reconstructed skeleton of Llistrofus, which may be synonymous with Hapsidopareion

Hapsidopareion was named in 1973 by American paleontologist Eleanor Daly based on material collected from the early Permian South Grandfield locality in southwestern Oklahoma. The genus name is given for the Greek hapsido- ('arch') and -pareion ('cheek'). The species name, H. lepton, is given for the slightness of the animal. The taxon is known from several partial to complete skulls and possibly by some isolated postcranial material.

== Anatomy ==
Hapsidopareion was originally differentiated from other microsaurs by the large temporal emargination, which produced other variable morphology of the circum-emargination bones (e.g., postorbital). It is similar to the more recently described Llistrofus pricei in this regard, but can be differentiated from L. pricei by features such as the absence of a quadratojugal and a frontal excluded from the orbit. Because all specimens of H. lepton are notably smaller than those of L. pricei, and a number of anatomical differences are likely ontogenetically variable (e.g., contact between neural arch and centrum), some researchers considered that the former maybe represent a juvenile of the latter, but recent workers have maintained the separation of these taxa. Using high-resolution micro-CT scans of three skulls of the coeval Hapsidopareion, Jenkins et al. (2025) identified that many of the characters used to distinguish Llistrofus from it are shared by both taxa, documenting the presence of a quadratojugal in Hapsidopareion and demonstrating that the supposed exclusion of the frontal from the orbit was due to crushing in the holotype specimen. Due to its larger size, they identified Llistrofus as representing a more mature ontogenetic stage of Hapsidopareion, and argued that the former should be regarded as a junior synonym of the latter.

== Relationships ==
Hapsidopareion is the sister taxon to Llistrofus forms the family Hapsidopareiidae (traditionally called the 'Hapsidopareiontidae') within the Recumbirostra. The family is recognized by the greatly enlarged temporal emargination. In their 2025 publication, Jenkins et al. discussed the possible synonymy of Hapsidopareion and Llistrofus. The results of their phylogenetic analyses are displayed in the cladogram below, where they found recumbirostrans to be a clade along the amniote stem:

- - - Limnoscelis
    - - Captorhinidae
      - - Protorothyris
        - Amniota
  - Recumbirostra
    - Pantylus
    - - - - Hapsidopareion (including Llistrofus)
          - Odonterpetidae
        - Chthonosauria
          - Molgophidae
          - Brachystelechidae
      - Nastrondormes
        - - Huskerpeton
          - Proxilodon
        - - Gymnarthridae
          - - Rhynchonkidae
            - Ostodolepididae
