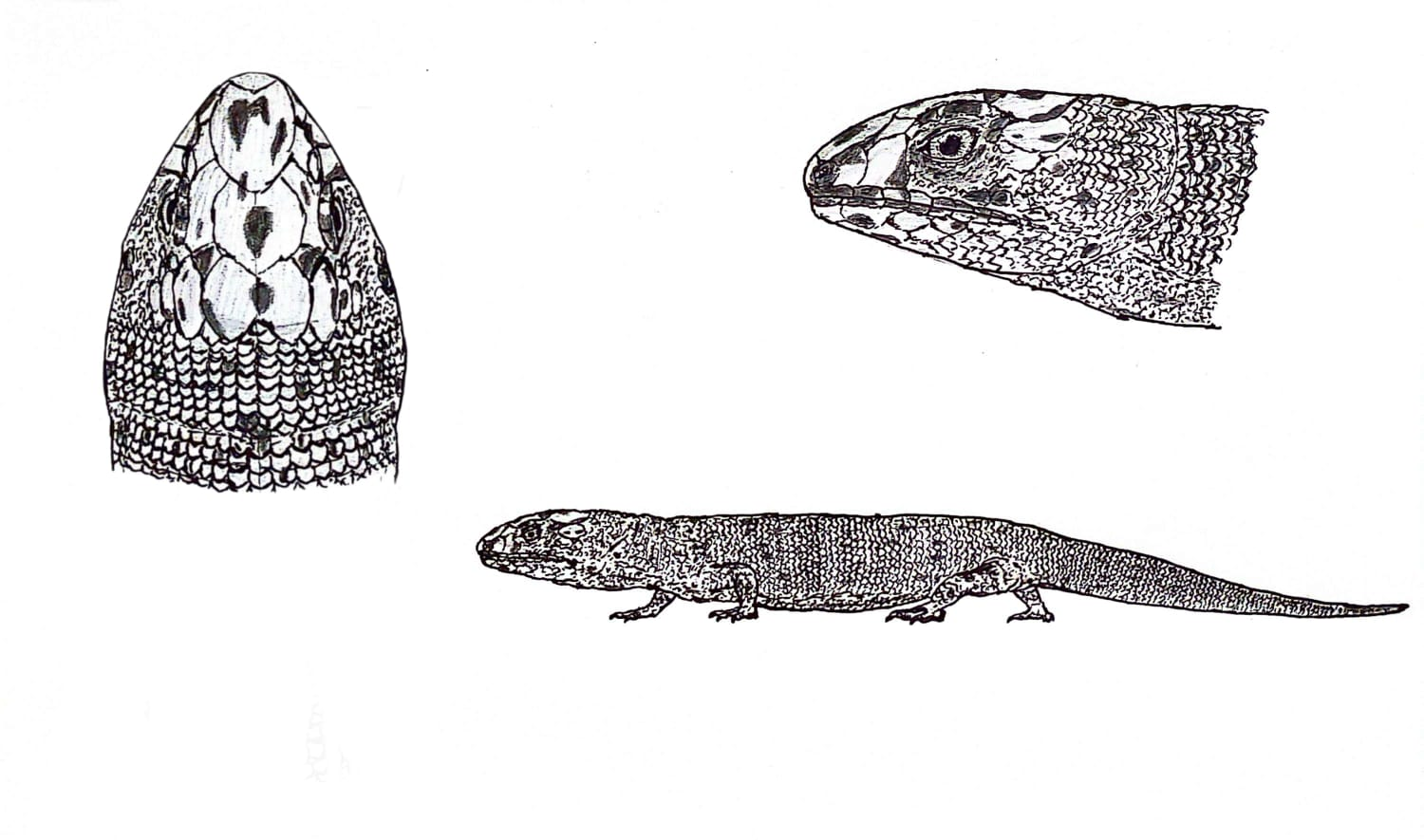
- Leiocephalikon problematicum

Scientific classification
- Kingdom: Animalia
- Phylum: Chordata
- Family: †Gymnarthridae
- Genus: †Leiocephalikon; Steen, 1934

Type species
- Amblyodon problematicum John William Dawson, 1882

= Leiocephalikon =

Leiocephalikon Temporal range: Carboniferous

Extinct genus of tetrapods

Leiocephalikon is an extinct genus of microsaur in the family Gymnarthridae. The type species is Amblyodon problematicum named by John William Dawson in 1882. Its fossil was found in the Joggins Formation which hailed from Carboniferous period. Although sometimes regarded as primitive gymnarthrids, Leiocephalikon classification is still debated as its fossil is scarce.
