= Ricnodon =

Ricnodon Temporal range: Carboniferous, 318.1–306.95 Ma

Scientific classification
- Kingdom: Animalia
- Phylum: Chordata
- Clade: †Microsauria
- Family: †Hapsidopareiidae
- Genus: †Ricnodon; Fritsch, 1883

Extinct genus of tetrapods

Ricnodon is an extinct genus of microsaur within the family Hapsidopareiidae. The genus name means ‘wrinkled tooth’ from Ancient Greek ῥικνός and odôn. The specific name honors Edward Drinker Cope.
