= Sparodus =

Scientific classification
- Kingdom: Animalia
- Phylum: Chordata
- Family: †Gymnarthridae
- Genus: †Sparodus; Fritsch, 1876

Extinct genus of tetrapods

Sparodus is an extinct genus of microsaur within the family Gymnarthridae.
