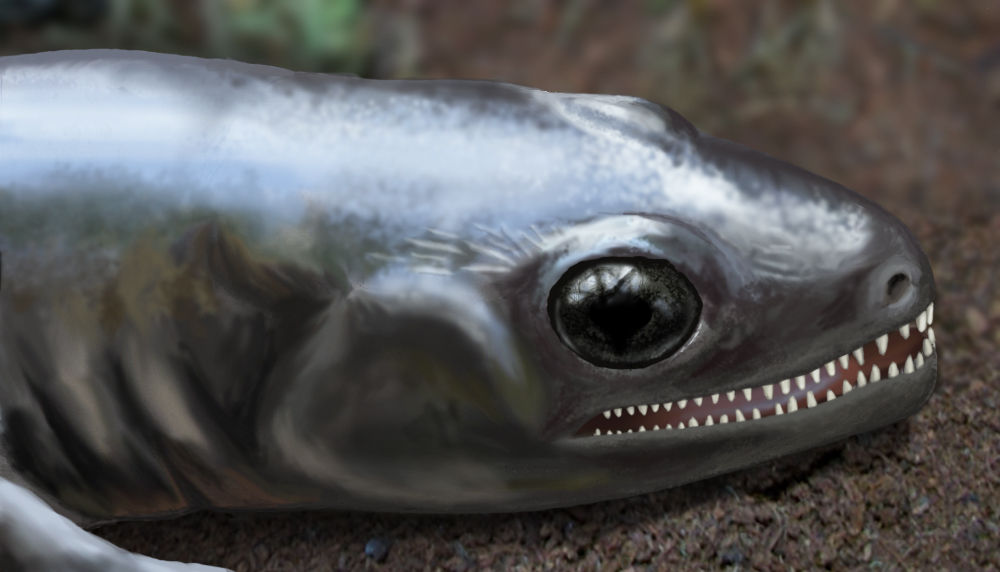
- Life restoration of Llistrofus

Scientific classification
- Kingdom: Animalia
- Phylum: Chordata
- Clade: †Microsauria
- Suborder: †Tuditanomorpha
- Family: †Hapsidopareiidae; Daly, 1973

= Hapsidopareiidae =

Hapsidopareiidae Temporal range: Early Permian

Extinct family of tetrapods

Hapsidopareiidae is an extinct family of microsaurs. Hapsidopareiids are known from the Early Permian of the United States and possibly Germany and the Czech Republic.

Hapsidopareiids are characterized by a large temporal embayment near the cheek region in which the quadratojugal is greatly reduced or absent. Members of Ostodolepidae, another microsaur family, also possess temporal embayments, but they not as extensive as those of hapsidopareiids, which extend into the skull roof. In hapsidopareiids, the embayment may have provided space for an enlarged jaw adductor musculature, although certain characteristics of the skull do not support this idea.

Hapsidopareion and Llistrofus both possess this embayment, but in Saxonerpeton, the temporal region is complete. The lack of a temporal embayment may exclude Saxonerpeton from Hapsidopareiidae; Bolt and Rieppel (2009) considered the family to include only Hapsidopareion and Llistrofus because of this. Jenkins et al. (2025) considered Hapsidopareion and Llistrofus to be synonymous, suggesting that this family comprises only its singular titular taxon.
