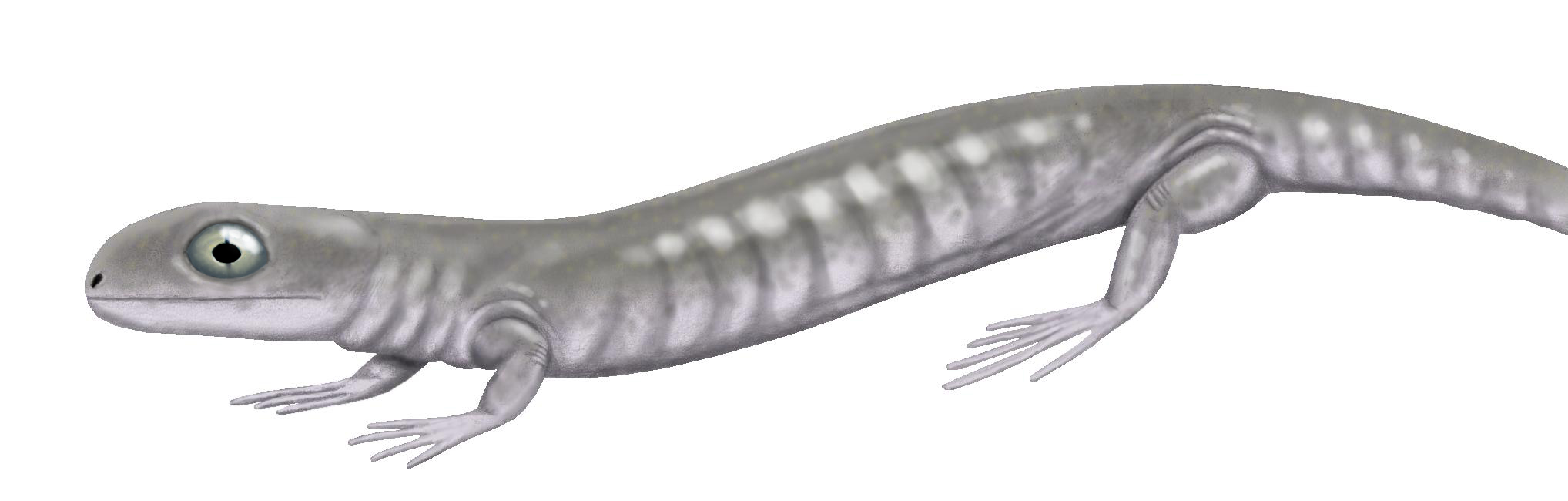
- Restoration of Utaherpeton franklini

Scientific classification
- Kingdom: Animalia
- Phylum: Chordata
- Clade: †Microsauria
- Genus: †Utaherpeton; Carroll et al., 1991

Type species
- †Utaherpeton franklini Carroll et al., 1991

= Utaherpeton =

Extinct genus of tetrapods

Utaherpeton is an extinct genus of tetrapod from the Carboniferous of Utah. It is possibly one of the oldest and basalmost known "lepospondyls", or it instead may be a stem-tetrapod. The genus is monotypic, including only the type species Utaherpeton franklini. Utaherpeton was named in 1991 from the Manning Canyon Shale Formation, which dates to the Mississippian-Pennsylvanian boundary. It was originally classified within Microsauria, a group of superficially lizard- and salamander-like lepospondyls that is now no longer considered to be a valid clade or evolutionary grouping, but rather an evolutionary grade consisting of the most basal lepospondyls. Utaherpeton has been proposed as both the most basal "lepospondyl" and the oldest "microsaur", although more derived lepospondyls are known from earlier in the Carboniferous. However, its position within Lepospondyli remains uncertain due to the incomplete preservation of the only known specimen. The inclusion of Utaherpeton in various phylogenetic analyses has resulted in multiple phylogenies (hypotheses of evolutionary relationships) that are very different from one another, making it a significant taxon in terms of understanding the interrelationships of "lepospondyls" and tetrapods more broadly.

== Description ==
Like many other lepospondyls, Utaherpeton is salamander-like in appearance. It has an elongated body made up of 26 presacral (neck and back) vertebrae. The total body length excluding the tail is about 4 centimetres (1.6 in). The forelimbs are markedly smaller than the hind limbs, and the hind feet are unusual in that they are larger than the rest of the hind limbs. A unique anatomical feature that distinguishes Utaherpeton from other "microsaur" lepospondyls is a connection between the prefrontal and premaxilla bones at the front of the skull.

== Classification ==
When Utaherpeton was first described in 1991, it was tentatively classified within a group of "microsaurs" called Microbrachomorpha, which included the better-known Microbrachis. A 2001 phylogenetic analysis found Utaherpeton to be the most basal lepospondyl, followed by the "microsaur" Hyloplesion, which has also been considered a microbrachomorph. However, Microbrachomorpha was not recognized as a true clade because Microbrachis was found to be more deeply nested within Lepospondyli, more closely related to derived lepospondyls like nectrideans and aïstopods than to other "microsaurs". A 2004 analysis including Utaherpeton produced a very different phylogeny for lepospondyls, placing aïstopods and nectrideans as the most basal lepospondyls, followed by a paraphyletic assemblage of "microsaurs". Utaherpeton was still recovered as one of the most basal "microsaurs", but not as the most basal lepospondyl. Tentative support for a close relationship between Utaherpeton and Microbrachis was also found. In a 2010 analysis, all "microsaurs" except Utaherpeton were recovered within a monophyletic group, but Utaherpeton was found to be the most basal member of a separate clade that included all other lepospondyls. Igielman et al. (2026) found Utaherpeton as a derived member of the tetrapod stem-group.
