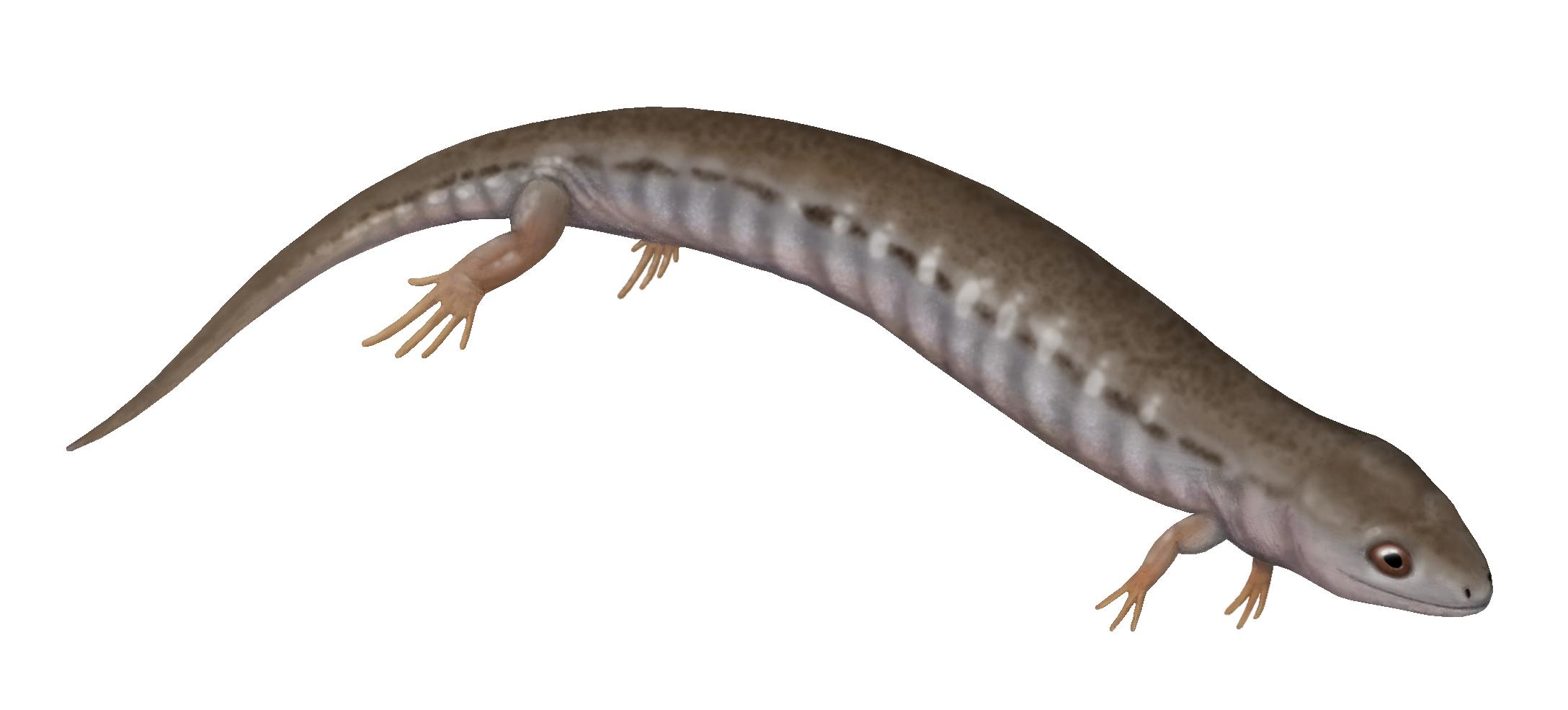

Scientific classification
- Kingdom: Animalia
- Phylum: Chordata
- Clade: †Microsauria
- Family: †Hyloplesiontidae; Carroll & Gaskill, 1978
- Genus: †Hyloplesion; Fritsch, 1883

Type species
- Stelliosaurus longicostatus Fritsch, 1875

= Hyloplesion =

Hyloplesion Temporal range: Late Carboniferous

Extinct genus of tetrapods

Hyloplesion is an extinct genus of microbrachomorph microsaur. It is the type and only genus within the family Hyloplesiontidae. Fossils have been found from the Czech Republic near the towns of Plzeň, Nýřany, and Třemošná, and date back to the Middle Pennsylvanian. The type species is H. longicostatum, named in 1883. Two species belonging to different genera, Seeleya pusilla and Orthocosta microscopica, have been synonymized with H. longicostatum and are thought to represent very immature individuals.

== Description ==
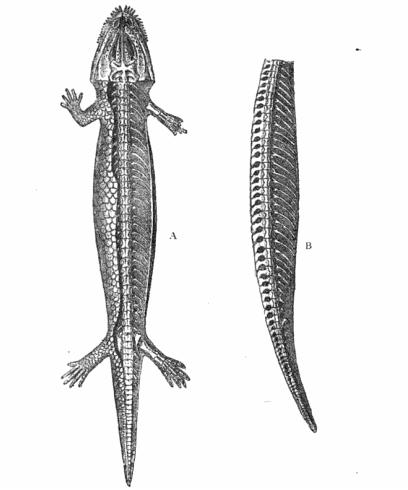
Illustration of an immature Hyloplesion, originally called Seeleya pusilla, by Antonin Fritsch.

Hyloplesion was about as large as a medium-sized salamander, with the length of known specimens ranging from 17-77mm.

The skull is triangular in shape. Unlike many other microsaurs, the palate of Hyloplesion contains large vacuities, or openings. The fifth maxillary tooth is enlarged and resembles a canine. The skull of Hyloplesion superficially resembles that of the unrelated romeriid reptile Romeria in lateral view due to similarities in the pattern of the dermal bones and the hooked shape of the premaxilla. However, the skull differs from that of Romeria in dorsal view, as the parietals are much wider in Hyloplesion.

The atlas arch also resembles those of romeriids and, unlike other microsaurs, is unswollen. The trunk is elongate, with thin ribs extending from each vertebra. The presence of a large scapulocoracoid in Hyloplesion distinguishes it from Microbrachis. The limb bones are small and robust, with the hindlimbs being quite larger than the forelimbs . Like other microbrachomorphs such as Microbrachis, Hyloplesion has only three digits in the manus, a condition known as tridactyly.

== Paleobiology ==
A range of morphological characteristics makes it difficult to determine whether Hyloplesion was primarily terrestrial or aquatic. Although the digits are well ossified, the reduced number of toes in Hyloplesion is seen as an adaptation for an aquatic lifestyle. There is no evidence for lateral-line canals in the skull, although they were most likely present, separated from the skull by a layer of connective tissue.
