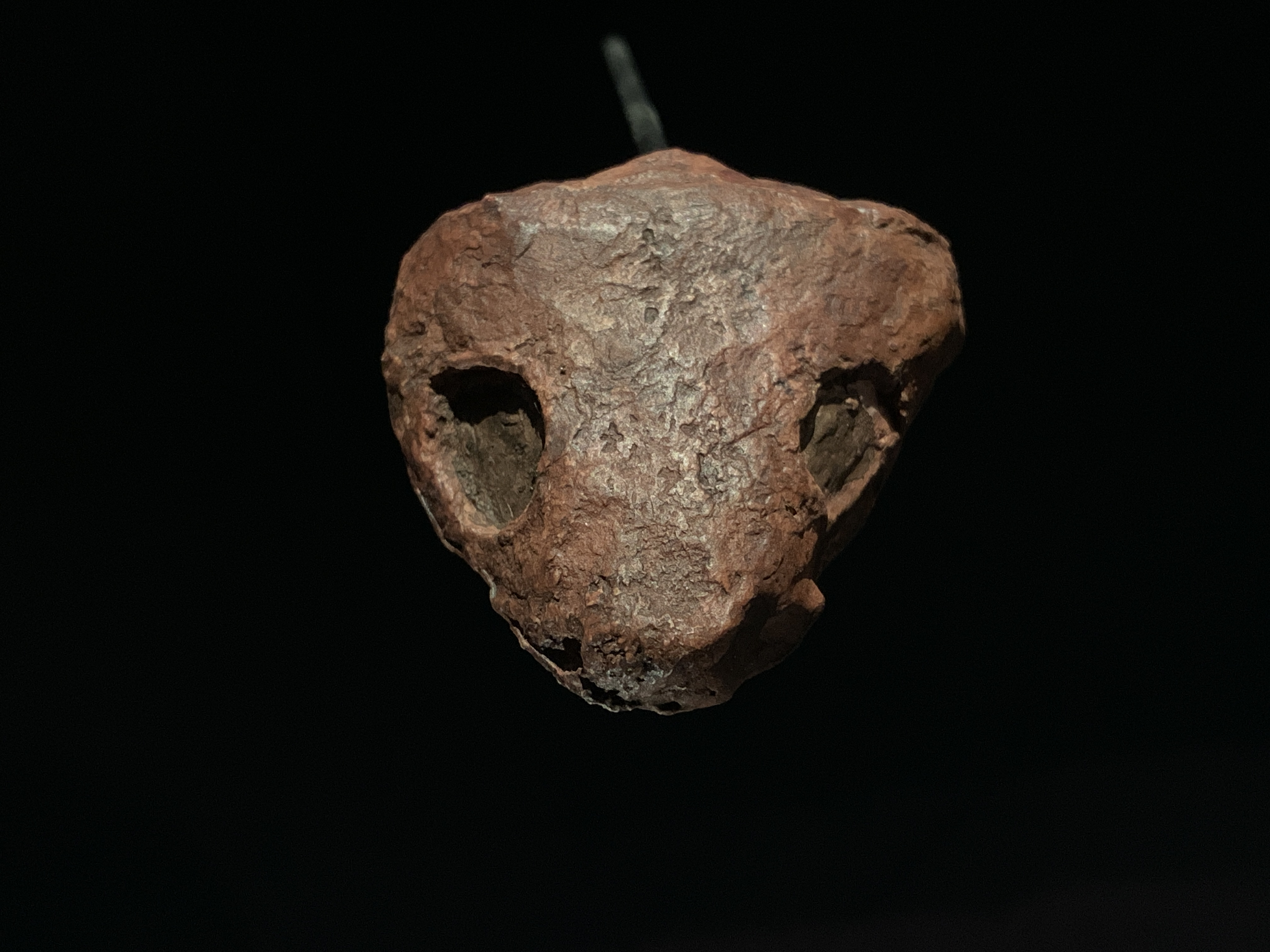
- Skull cast at the Royal Tyrrell Museum

Scientific classification
- Kingdom: Animalia
- Phylum: Chordata
- Family: †Ostodolepidae
- Genus: †Micraroter; Daly, 1973

Species
- †M. erythrogeois Daly, 1973 (type)

= Micraroter =

Micraroter Temporal range: Early Permian

Extinct genus of tetrapods

Micraroter is an extinct genus of microsaur within the family Ostodolepidae.
