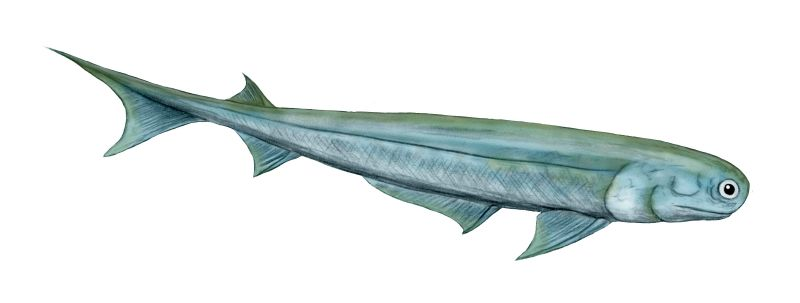
- an acanthodian
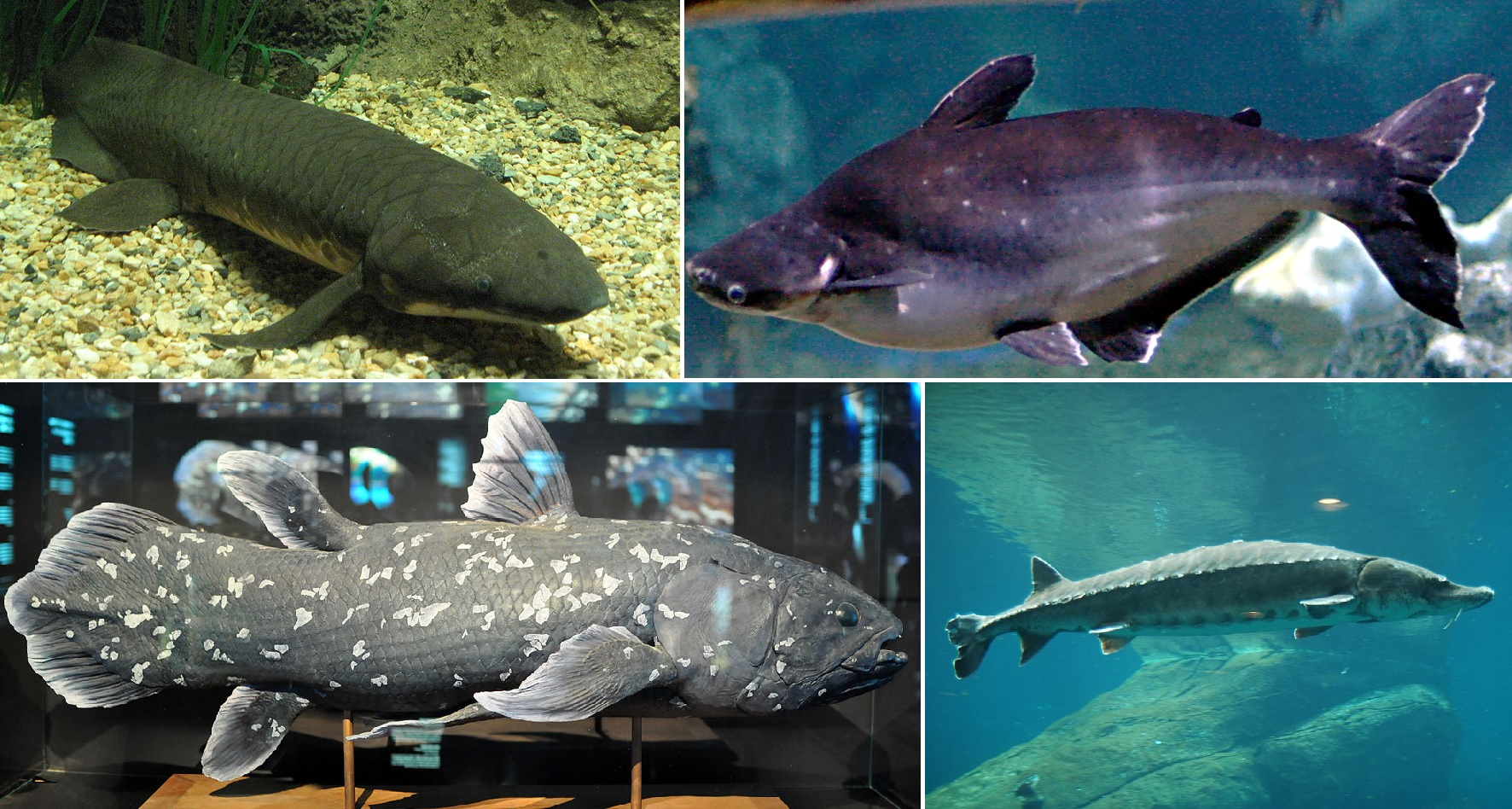
- Four species of bony fish

Scientific classification (obsolete as paraphyletic)
- Kingdom: Animalia
- Phylum: Chordata
- Clade: Eugnathostomata
- (unranked): Teleostomi; C. L. Bonaparte, 1836

Subgroups
- †Acanthodii; Euteleostomi ("Osteichthyes"); Actinopterygii (majority of all fish); Sarcopterygii (includes tetrapods)

= Teleostomi =

Teleostomes Temporal range: 445–0 Ma Ordovician – Present

Obsolete group of jawed vertebrates

Teleostomi (from Greek τελεος, complete + Greek στόμα, mouth) is an obsolete taxon of jawed vertebrates that supposedly includes the tetrapods, bony fish, and the wholly extinct acanthodian fish. Key characters of this group include an operculum and a single pair of respiratory openings, features which were lost or modified in some later representatives. The teleostomes include all jawed vertebrates except the chondrichthyans and the extinct class Placodermi.

Recent studies indicate that Osteichthyes evolved from placoderms like Entelognathus, while acanthodians are more closely related to modern chondrichthyes. Teleostomi, therefore, is not a valid, natural clade, but a paraphyletic group of species.

== Origins ==
The origins of the teleostomes are obscure. They are traditionally assumed to be descendants of the acanthodians ("spiny sharks") from the Early Silurian Period; however, more recent discoveries show that the "spiny sharks" are actually a paraphyletic assemblage leading to Chondrichthyes, and that placoderms like Entelognathus are more closely related to true bony fish. Living teleostomes constitute the clade Euteleostomi, which includes all osteichthyans and tetrapods. Even after the acanthodians perished at the end of the Permian, their euteleostome relatives flourished such that today they comprise 99% of living vertebrate species.

== Physical characteristics ==
Teleostomes have two major adaptations that relate to aquatic respiration. First, the early teleostomes probably had some type of operculum; however, it was not the one-piece affair of living fish. The development of a single respiratory opening seems to have been an important step. The second adaptation, the teleostomes also developed a primitive lung with the ability to use some atmospheric oxygen. This developed, in later species, into the lung and (later) the swim bladder, used to keep the fish at neutral buoyancy.

Acanthodians share with actinopterygians the characteristic of three otoliths, the sagitta in the sacculus, the asteriscus in the lagena, and the lapillus in the utriculus. In dipnoans there are only two otoliths and in Latimeria there is only one.

However, most of the above synapomorphies can ultimately be found in several chondrichthyan groups.

== Relationships ==
- Gnathostomata
  - †Placodermi (paraphyletic)
  - Eugnathostomata
    - Chondrichthyes (total group)
      - Chondrichthyes (crown group)
      - †Acanthodii (paraphyletic)
    - Osteichthyes
      - Actinopterygii
      - Sarcopterygii (includes tetrapods)
