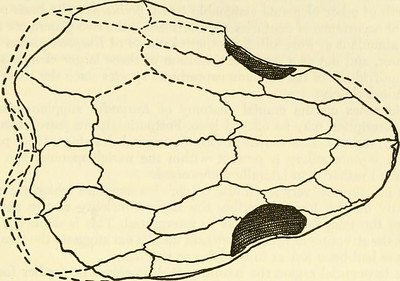
- Euryodus skull in dorsal view

Scientific classification
- Kingdom: Animalia
- Phylum: Chordata
- Family: †Gymnarthridae
- Genus: †Euryodus; Olson, 1939

= Euryodus =

Euryodus Temporal range: Permian

Extinct genus of amphibians

Euryodus is an extinct genus of microsaur within the family Gymnarthridae. Euryodus is a Lepospondyl from the clade Microsauria that lived during the Early Permian. The name comes from Greek, meaning ‘broad-tooth’. It has been found in the southern half of North America, from its original discovery in Texas up to Utah.

== Geological information ==
From the Clear Fork formation, there are many other animals found with Euryodus. Most commonly this was other amphibians such as Lysorophus, but includes fish and other reptiles as well. Euryodus primus was found to be relatively common in this rock formation.

The specimen was found in the red clay, cemented by calcite and silica. This is similar to what is left in modern rain pools by streams in the same area. The abundance of Euryodus in one of these pools suggests that the animal was either not able to leave the water, or did not leave these pools very often. Rocks from the Clear Fork formation are known to be from the lower Permian era.

== Paleoecology ==
30-40 taxa and many flora are found in the Clear Fork Group. The plant life of the time was dominated by seed-bearing plants. Plants requiring wet soil were more uncommon, though some fossils of tree ferns were found here. The plants also show signs of seasonal dryness.

Other fauna found in the Clear Fork Group includes not only Lysorophus, but other gymnarthridae, Diplocaulus, and fish. Euryodus would have lived in the pools along with the other fauna in the area. Several authors have suggested that these pools would have occasionally dried out, resulting in a relatively difficult environment for entirely aquatic animals to survive in.

Research done at the Speiser Shale of eastern Kansas suggests that many amphibians living in the area would build burrows in response to drought. Euryodus, adapted for fossorial life, would most likely have adapted this strategy as well in order to survive dry periods when the pools they live in would have disappeared.

== Discovery ==
It was first described and named by Everett Claire Olson in the summer of 1939. He led a field party from Walker Museum to the Clear Fork formation in Baylor County, Texas. The party collected many nodules with Lysorophus remains. Within these nodules, they found what would be named the Euryodus primus. The nodules came from the west bank of Brushy Creek.

== Misdiagnosis controversy ==
Several new species of Euryodus were later classified under different genera.

A new species, Euryodus bonneri was discovered at the Speiser Shale by Schultze and Foreman in 1981, though it was disputed by Carroll in 1998. Huttenlocker renamed the specimen to Proxilodon bonneri in his 2013 paper, owing to the 5 premaxillary teeth as opposed to the 3 or 4 of other gymnarthrids, and does not possess the anteriorly placed jaw articulation and enlarged mid-row dentary tooth typical of Euryodus. Proxilodon is the Latinized form of Euryodus, meaning the same thing.

Fossils found at Richards Spur in Oklahoma that were previously thought to be Euryodus skeletons were newly classified as Opisthodontosaurus carrolli, a captorhinid. This was due to a high level of convergence between the mandibular and dental anatomy of the two groups, such as the second tooth row on the dentary. However, the neurocranium of the specimens differs from that of Euryodus dalyae, with no unpaired median ossifications. High resolution micro-computed tomography done on the specimen also reveals that the endocranium has an ossified, which is uncommon in gymnarthrids. It was later argued that all elements found at Richards Spur previously classified as Euryodus were in fact not Euryodus at all but the new captorhinid.

== Description ==
Microsaurs are adapted for fossorial ecologies, meaning that they dug and lived in burrows. Examples of these adaptations include an overhanging snout, a heavily ossified neurocranium, an elongate trunk, and shorter limbs. Though there are some microsaurs that managed to grow to larger sizes, the majority of them were often quite small (including Euryodus).

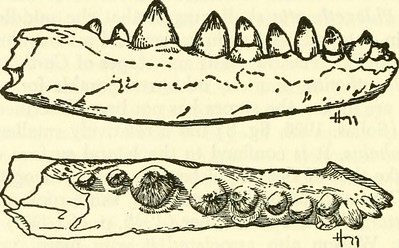
Euryodus dentary and teeth

=== Teeth ===
Euryodus is “easily identifiable on the basis of their large, bulbous teeth”. They are known to have coronoid teeth similar to Cardiocephalus and Bolterpeton, with enamel striations on the tooth surface towards the lingual side. There are 13 teeth in the upper jaw, with the seventh being the largest. The number of teeth in the dentary ranges from 9 to 12. The lower jaw is described as "heavy".

The marginal teeth are acrodont (attached to the jaw via a ring of bone). The anterior and posterior teeth have more compressed tips, while the teeth in the center of the row have conical tips. Many teeth have grooves cut into the lateral face, most likely due to rubbing against the other teeth.

Euryodus possesses the ability to replace their teeth. A resorption pit on the lingual side of the tooth served as a starting point, which then enlarged and reached the pulp cavity of the tooth. The tooth would then eventually drop off, leaving behind the base of the tooth. The replacement would then develop outside the cavity and move in after the previous tooth was lost. Euryodus tooth replacement is therefore nearly simultaneous.

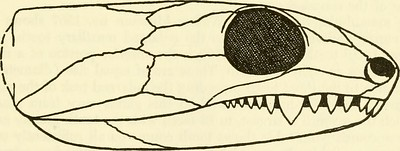
Euryodus in lateral view

==== Skull ====
The skull length is roughly 33 mm, with the temporal width being roughly 23 mm. The long postorbital region and slightly convex occiput are traits that it shares with most gymnarthrids, which may have contributed to Proxilodon bonneri’s misdiagnosis as an Euryodus. The skull is quite narrow, necessitating narrower nasals as well.

The occipital plate of the skull is vertical, narrow, and has a large, triangular foramen magnum. The skull does not possess fenestrae on the roof, except for the orbits, nares, and otic notch. Euryodus does not possess a pineal foramen. The palate is covered in bone. The parasphenoid basal plate is quadrangular, and the basipterygoid articulations are close together. The pterygoid extends into the subtemporal fenestra.

The braincase has ossified pleurosphenoids, and orbitosphenoids that brace against the skull roof. The otic capsules are well ossified, and has unpaired median ossifications.

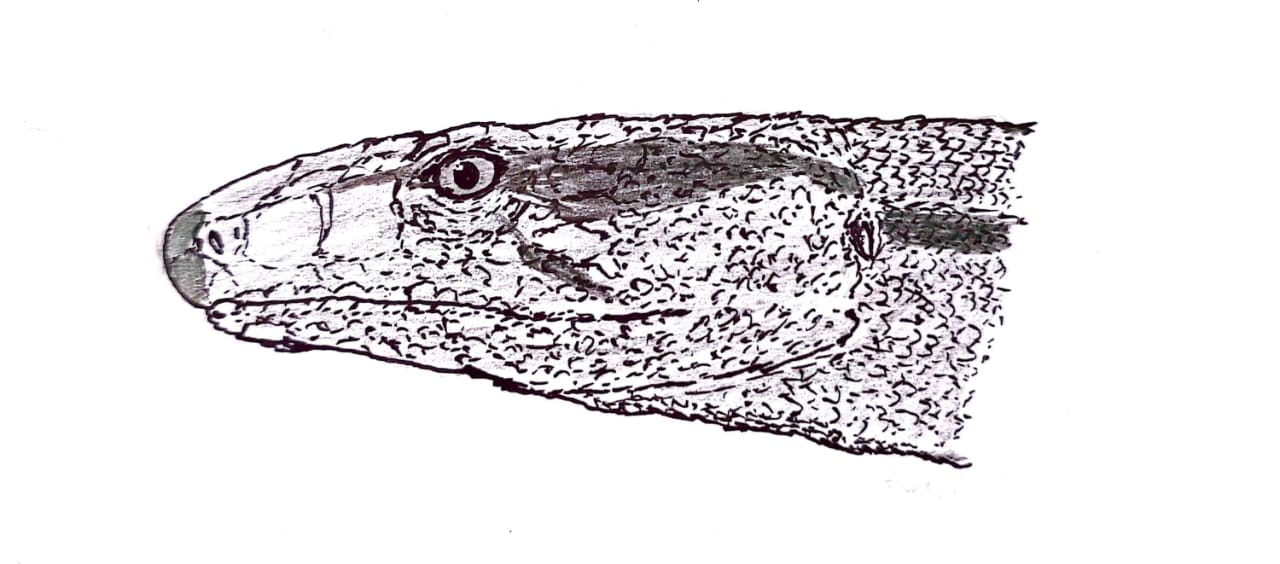
Reconstruction of the head.

In order to give the Euryodus a stronger jaw, the skull swells outward at the cheek. It also had a deep masseteric fossa, allowing a single enlarged tooth that the animal would be able to use to crush its food.

The mandibles are often obscured, but have two rows of teeth on a massive dentary. This feature is unusual in microsaurs, being much more common in captorhinids. The presence of the second tooth row suggests that microsaurs are closely related to reptiles.

The lower jaw passes from the snout to the back of the skull. The quadrate is located under the squamosal at the back of the skull. It is noted that sutures are hard to make out on Euryodus skulls. The premaxilla possess small foramina.

Vertebra

Euryodus vertebra have a single central ossification typical of lepospondyls, though it does not possess ventral grooving. The atlas flares anteriorly to articulate with the two condyles of the skull. The other vertebrae are otherwise similar, with single neural spines and a transverse process on the arch and on the centrum for the articulation of the ribs. The neural spines are relatively elongated

== See also ==
- Prehistoric amphibian
- List of prehistoric amphibians
