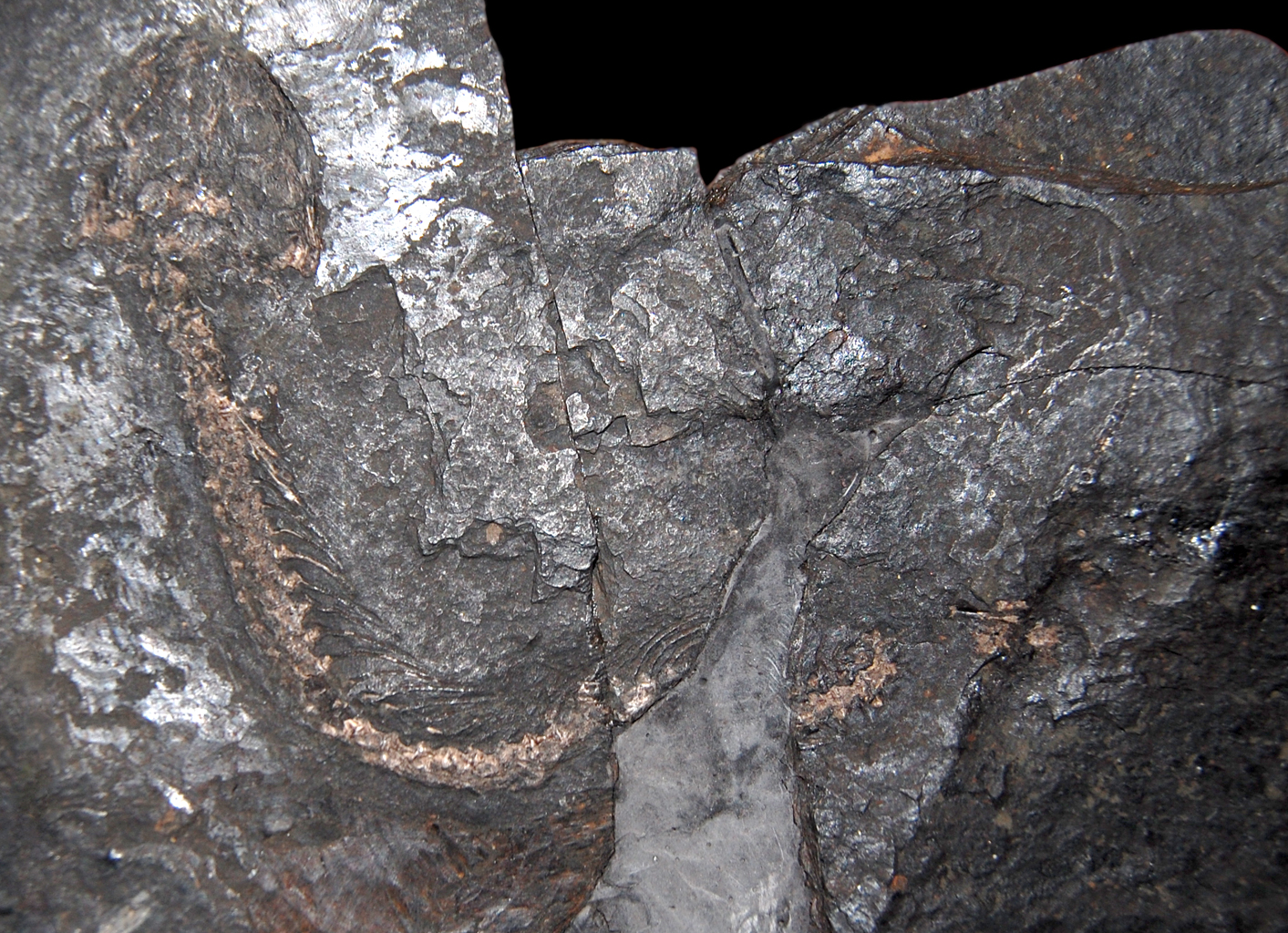
- Fossil of Microbrachis pelikani

Scientific classification
- Domain: Eukaryota
- Kingdom: Animalia
- Phylum: Chordata
- Clade: Teleostomi
- Clade: Tetrapoda
- Clade: †Microsauria
- Clade: †Recumbirostra
- Family: †Microbrachidae; Fritsch, 1883
- Genus: †Microbrachis; Fric, 1875

Type species
- †Microbrachis pelikani Fric, 1875

= Microbrachis =

Microbrachis Temporal range: Late Carboniferous 307.1–302 Ma

Extinct genus of tetrapods

Microbrachis is an extinct genus of microsaurian tetrapod from the Carboniferous Kladno Formation of the Czech Republic.

== Description ==
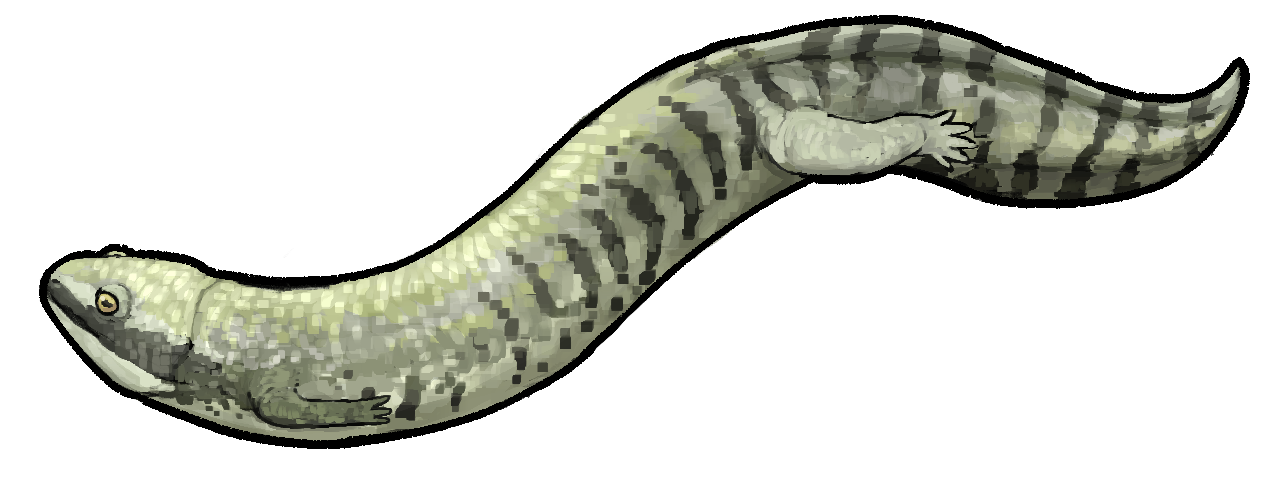
Life restoration of Microbrachis pelikani

Microbrachis was an elongated, salamander-like creature, about 15 centimetres (6 in) long, with over 40 vertebrae instead of the average 15–26 in its living relatives. It had minute limbs, and probably swam using fish-like lateral body movements. Microbrachis probably fed on fresh water plankton such as shrimp. Microbrachis was pedomorphic, retaining its larval gills in adulthood. Similar traits are found in the extant axolotl.
