= Gymnarthridae =

Gymnarthridae Temporal range: Late Carboniferous - Early Permian

Scientific classification
- Kingdom: Animalia
- Phylum: Chordata
- Clade: †Recumbirostra
- Family: †Gymnarthridae; Case, 1910

Genera
- Bolterpeton Anderson & Reisz, 2003; Cardiocephalus Broili, 1904; Cymatorhiza Olson & Barghusen, 1962; Elfridia Thayer, 1985; Euryodus Olson, 1939; Goniorhynchus Olson, 1970; Hylerpeton Owen, 1862; Leiocephalikon Steen, 1934; Pariotichus Cope, 1878; Sparodus Fric, 1876; Stegotretus Berman et al., 1988

Extinct family of tetrapods

Gymnarthridae is an extinct family of the group Recumbirostra. Gymnarthrids are known from Europe and North America and existed from the Late Carboniferous through the Early Permian. Remains have been found from the Czech Republic, Nova Scotia, Illinois, Texas, and Oklahoma. Previously they were considered tuditanomorph microsaurs.

Gymnarthrids are relatively elongate with short limbs. The skulls of gymnarthrids are also small, with a single row of large conical teeth on the margin of the jaw (a feature that distinguishes them from other microsaurs). In some genera, such as Bolterpeton and Cardiocephalus, the teeth are labiolingually compressed.

Gymnarthridae was first erected by E. C. Case in 1910 to include the newly described Gymnarthrus. It was placed in a new suborder, Gymnarthria. Case initially considered gymnarthrids to be reptiles, but later recognized them to be amphibians, placing Cardiocephalus in the family. Pariotichus was placed within Gymnarthridae by Alfred Romer after having previously been assigned to the basal amniote family Captorhinidae by Edward Drinker Cope.
