= Cardiocephalus =

Cardiocephalus Temporal range: Early Permian, 279.5–272.5 Ma

Scientific classification
- Kingdom: Animalia
- Phylum: Chordata
- Family: †Gymnarthridae
- Genus: †Cardiocephalus; Broili, 1904

Extinct genus of tetrapods

Cardiocephalus is an extinct genus of microsaurian tetrapods from the Permian period. It was a member of the family Gymnarthridae.
