= Pantylus =

Pantylus Temporal range: Early Permian

Scientific classification
- Kingdom: Animalia
- Phylum: Chordata
- Family: †Pantylidae
- Genus: †Pantylus; Cope, 1881
- Species: †P. cordatus

Binomial name
- †Pantylus cordatus Cope, 1881

Extinct genus of tetrapods

Pantylus (from Greek: παν pan, 'all' and Greek: τύλος tylos, 'knob') is an extinct microsaurian tetrapod from the Permian period of North America.

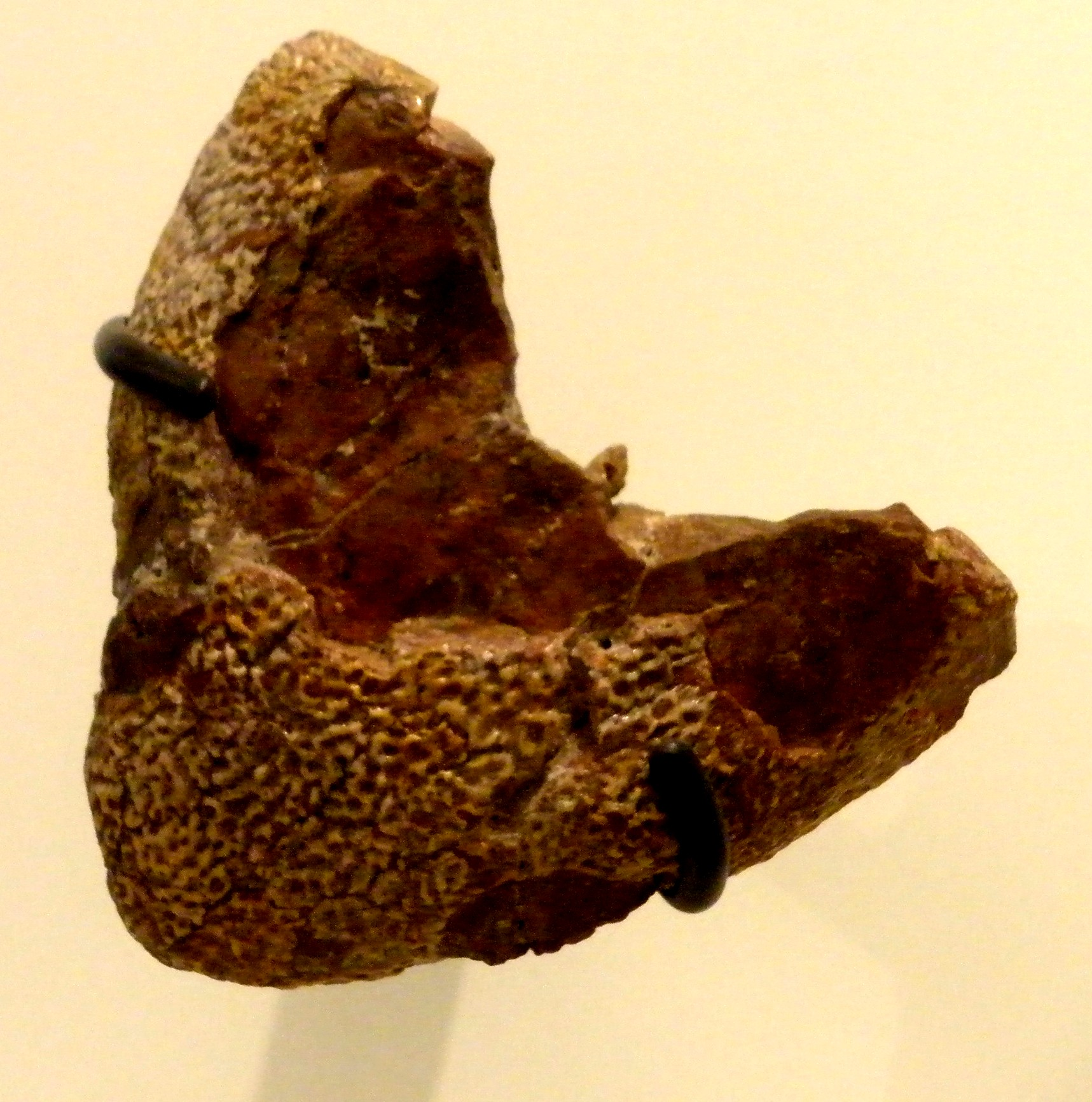
Pantylus cordatus

Pantylus was probably a largely terrestrial animal, judging from its well-built legs. It was about 25 centimetres (10 in) long, and resembled a lizard with a large skull and short limbs. It had numerous blunt teeth, and probably chased after invertebrate prey.
