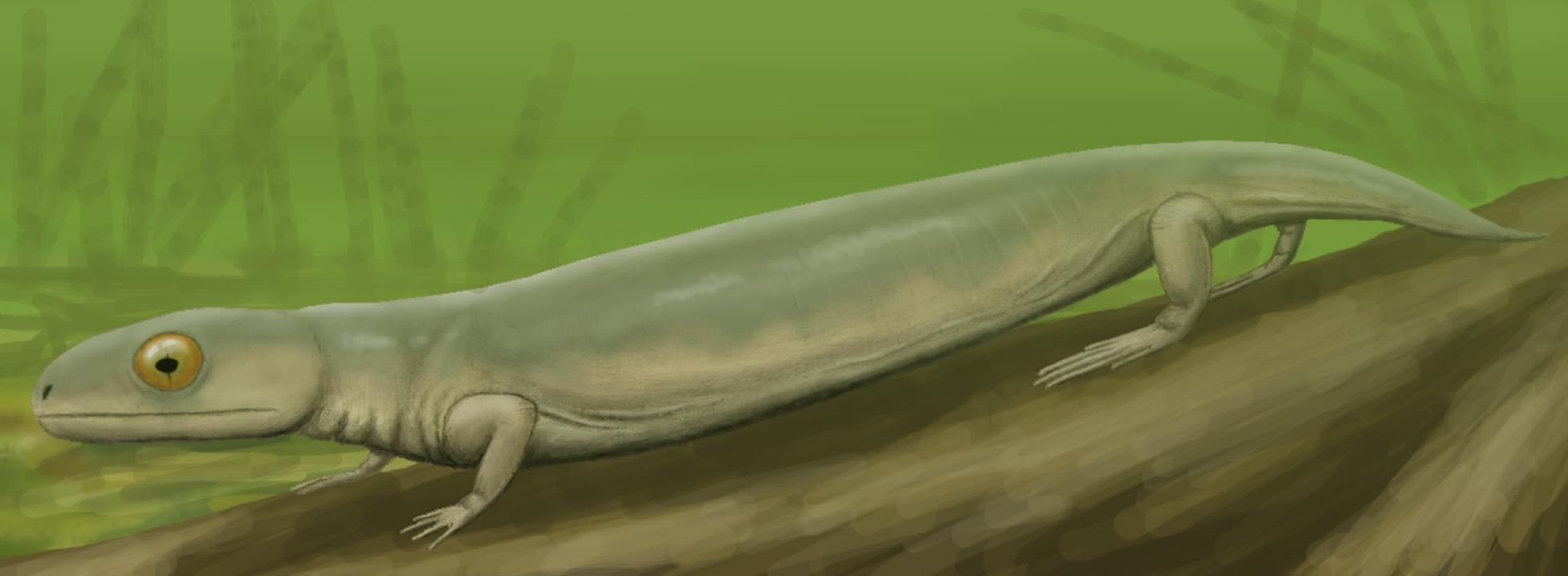

Scientific classification
- Kingdom: Animalia
- Phylum: Chordata
- Clade: †Microsauria
- Family: †Hapsidopareiidae
- Genus: †Saxonerpeton; Carroll & Gaskill, 1978

Type species
- †Saxonerpeton geinitzi Carroll & Gaskill, 1978

= Saxonerpeton =

Saxonerpeton Temporal range: Early Permian

Extinct genus of tetrapods

Saxonerpeton is an extinct genus of microsaur in the family Hapsidopareiidae. Fossils have been found from Early Permian strata near Dresden, Germany.
