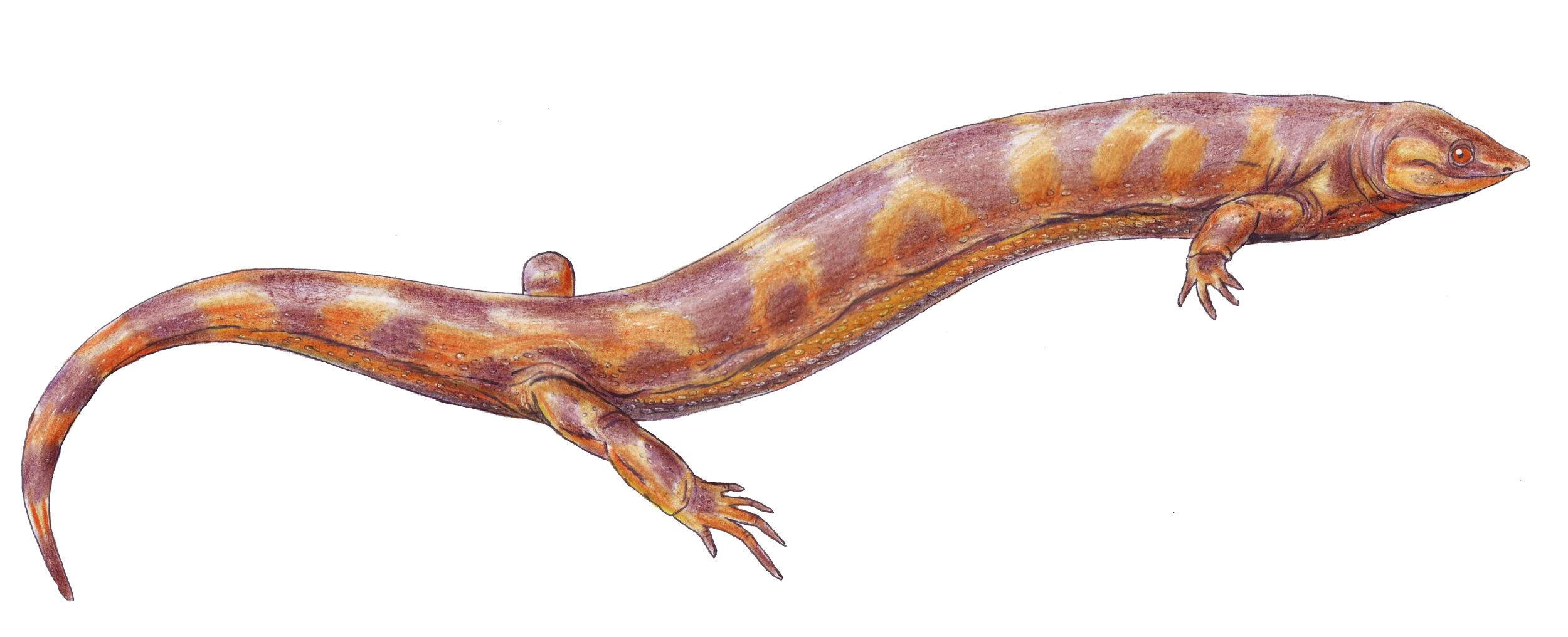
- Life restoration of Pelodosotis elongatum

Scientific classification
- Kingdom: Animalia
- Phylum: Chordata
- Clade: †Recumbirostra
- Family: †Ostodolepidae; Romer, 1945

Genera
- Micraroter; Nannaroter; Ostodolepis; Pelodosotis; Tambaroter

= Ostodolepidae =

Ostodolepidae Temporal range: Early Permian

Extinct family of tetrapods

Ostodolepidae, also spelled Ostodolepididae, is an extinct family of Early Permian tetrapods. Initially they were considered microsaurs, but later were assigned to the group Recumbirostra. Ostodolepids were relatively large, reaching lengths of up to 2 feet (61 cm), terrestrial, and presumably fossorial. Ostodolepid remains have been found from Early Permian beds in Texas, Oklahoma, and Germany.

Ostodolepids have elongated trunks, with small, robust limbs and shortened tails. The occiput is high, but the skull narrows toward the snout. The snout is pointed and projects past the jaw. In dorsal view, the skull is roughly triangular. The ventral temporal margin is emarginated. At the back of the skull, there is a large cavity between the supraoccipital and the skull roof. The skull is well ossified, with tight sutures between bones. The skull roof is relatively smooth, although scattered pits and grooves are usually present. There are 32 to 45 presacral vertebrae, and three sacral vertebrae.
