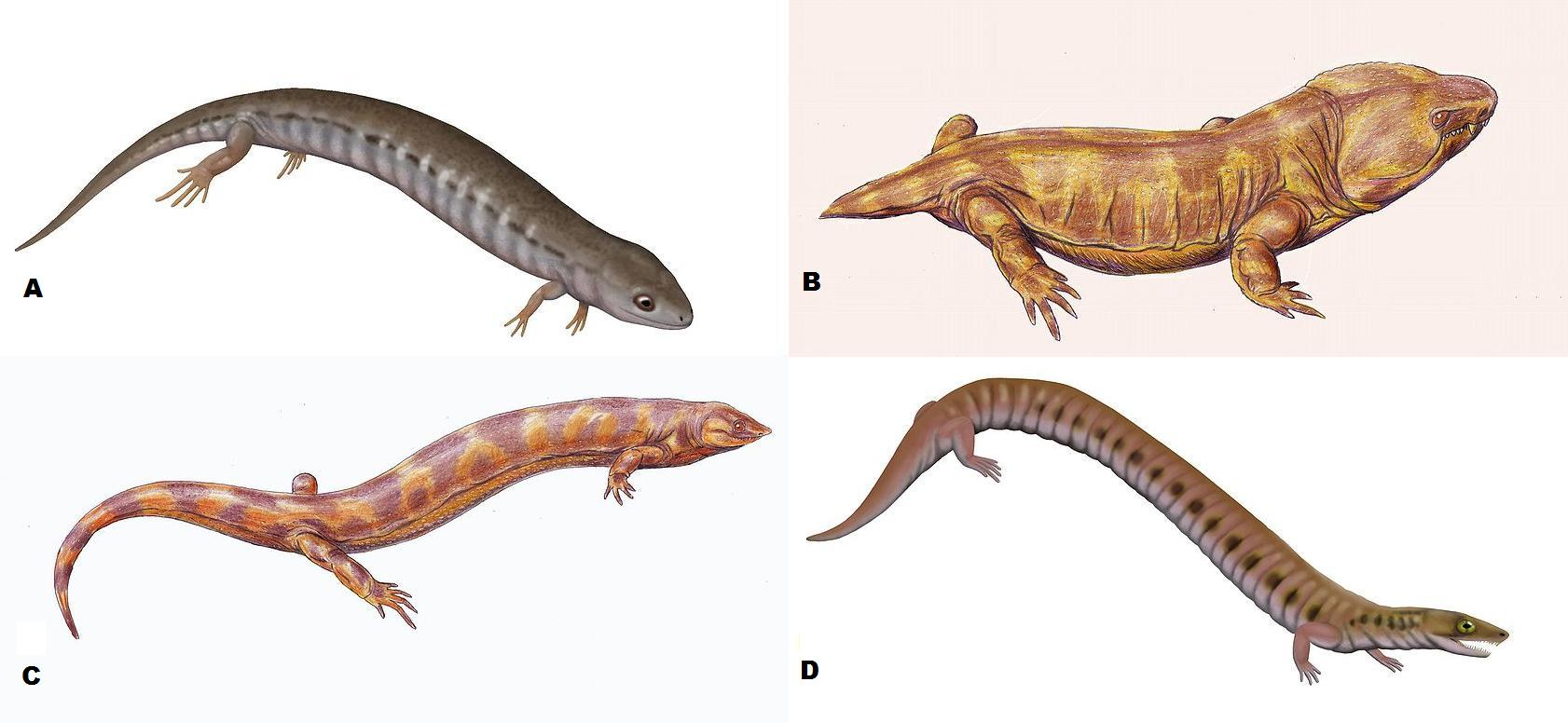
- Microsauria diversity: Hyloplesion (A), Pantylus (B), Pelodosotis (C) & Rhynchonkos (D)

Scientific classification
- Kingdom: Animalia
- Phylum: Chordata
- Clade: Tetrapoda
- Clade: †Microsauria; Dawson, 1863

Subgroups
- Archerpeton; Cymatorhiza; Hyloplesion; Kirktonecta; Trihecaton; Utaherpeton; Hapsidopareiidae; Microbrachidae; Tuditanidae; Recumbirostra

= Microsauria =

Microsauria Temporal range: Late Carboniferous-Early Permian, 318.1–270.6 Ma

Extinct order of tetrapods

Microsauria is an extinct, possibly polyphyletic order of tetrapods from the late Carboniferous and early Permian periods. It is the most diverse and species-rich group of lepospondyls. Recently, Microsauria has been considered paraphyletic, as several other non-microsaur lepospondyl groups such as Lysorophia seem to be nested in it. Microsauria is now commonly used as a collective term for the grade of stem amniotes that were originally classified as members of Microsauria.

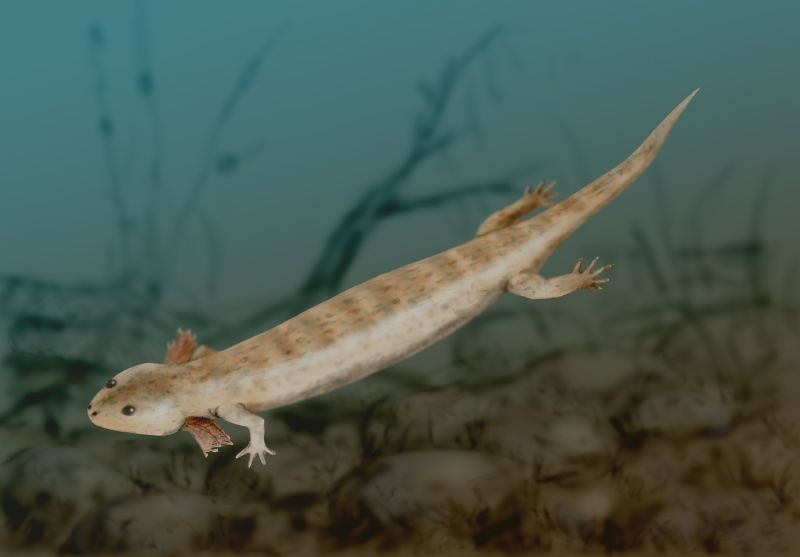
Microbrachis

The microsaurs all had short tails and small legs, but were otherwise quite varied in form. The group included lizard-like animals that were relatively well-adapted to living on dry land, burrowing forms, and others that, like the modern axolotl, retained their gills into adult life, and so presumably never left the water. Their skeleton was heavily ossified, and their development was likely gradual with no metamorphosis.

== Distribution ==
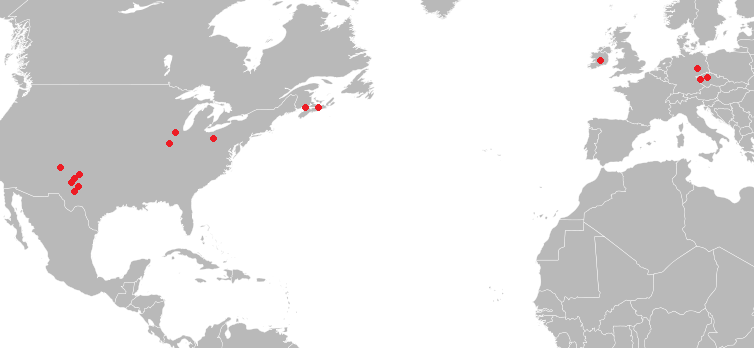
Microsaurs are known from Europe and North America.

Microsaur remains have been found from Europe and North America in Late Carboniferous and Early Permian localities. Most North American microsaurs have been found in the United States in Arizona, Texas, Oklahoma, Ohio, Illinois, as well as Kansas and Nebraska, although remains have also been found in Nova Scotia. In Europe, microsaurs are known from Germany and the Czech Republic. Possible microsaur remains have also been found from strata in the town of Vyazniki in the Vladimir Oblast of Russia. These strata are Late Permian in age, near the Permo-Triassic boundary. The microsaur material at Vyazniki may be the youngest record of microsaurs, and would extend their range by around 20 million years. However, fossil remains from Gansu Province shows possible Triassic record of microsaur.

== Classification ==
Cladogram modified from Anderson (2001), with microsaur taxa marked with yellow highlight:

- Lepospondyli
  - Utaherpeton
  - - Hyloplesion
    - - - Odonterpeton
        - - Hapsidopareiontidae
            - Saxonerpeton
            - - Hapsidopareion
              - Llistrofus
          - - Tuditanidae
              - Asaphestera
              - Tuditanus
            - - Ostodolepidae
                - Micraroter
                - Pelodosotis
              - - - Pantylidae
                    - Pantylus
                    - - Stegotretus
                      - Sparodus
                  - Gymnarthridae
                    - Cardiocephalus
                    - Euryodus
                - - Rhynchonkos
                  - - Eocaecilia (Lissamphibia)
                    - Brachystelechidae
                      - Batropetes
                      - - Carrolla
                        - Quasicaecilia
      - - Microbrachis
        - - Adelospondyli
          - - Scincosaurus
            - - Urocordylidae
                - Sauropleura
                - - Urocordylus
                  - - Ctenerpeton
                    - Ptyonius
              - - Diplocaulidae
                  - - Batrachiderpeton
                    - Keraterpeton
                  - - Diceratosaurus
                    - - Diploceraspis
                      - Diplocaulus
                - - Lysorophia
                  - Aïstopoda
  Microsaurs

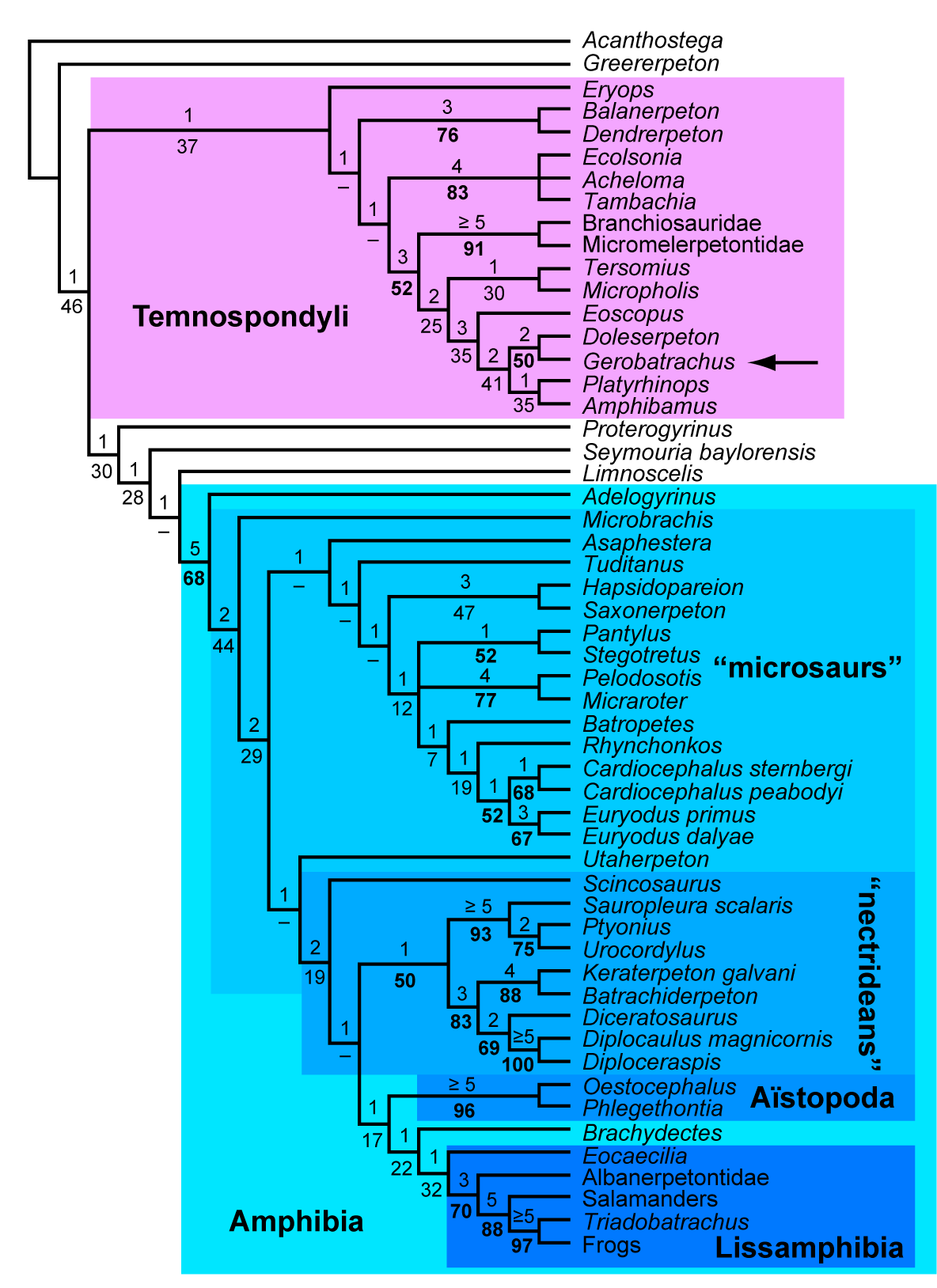
Marjanovic & Laurin (2009) tree from SOM

Cladogram from Ruta and Coates (2007):

- - - Odonterpeton
    - - Hyloplesion
      - Microbrachis
  - - Brachystelechidae
    - - - Tuditanidae
        - - Hapsidopareiontidae
          - - Ostodolepidae
            - - Rhynchonkos
              - Gymnarthridae
      - - Pantylidae
        - - Lysorophia
          - - Nectridea
            - Aïstopoda

A cladistic analysis by Pardo et al. (2017) placed recumbirostran microsaurs as members of Amniota. However, more recent variants of this matrix, such as Jenkins et al. (2025) place recumbirostrans on the amniote stem, a result corroborated by later iterations such as Mann et al. (2026), and analyses by Jenkins et al. (2026) and Igielman et al. (2026).
