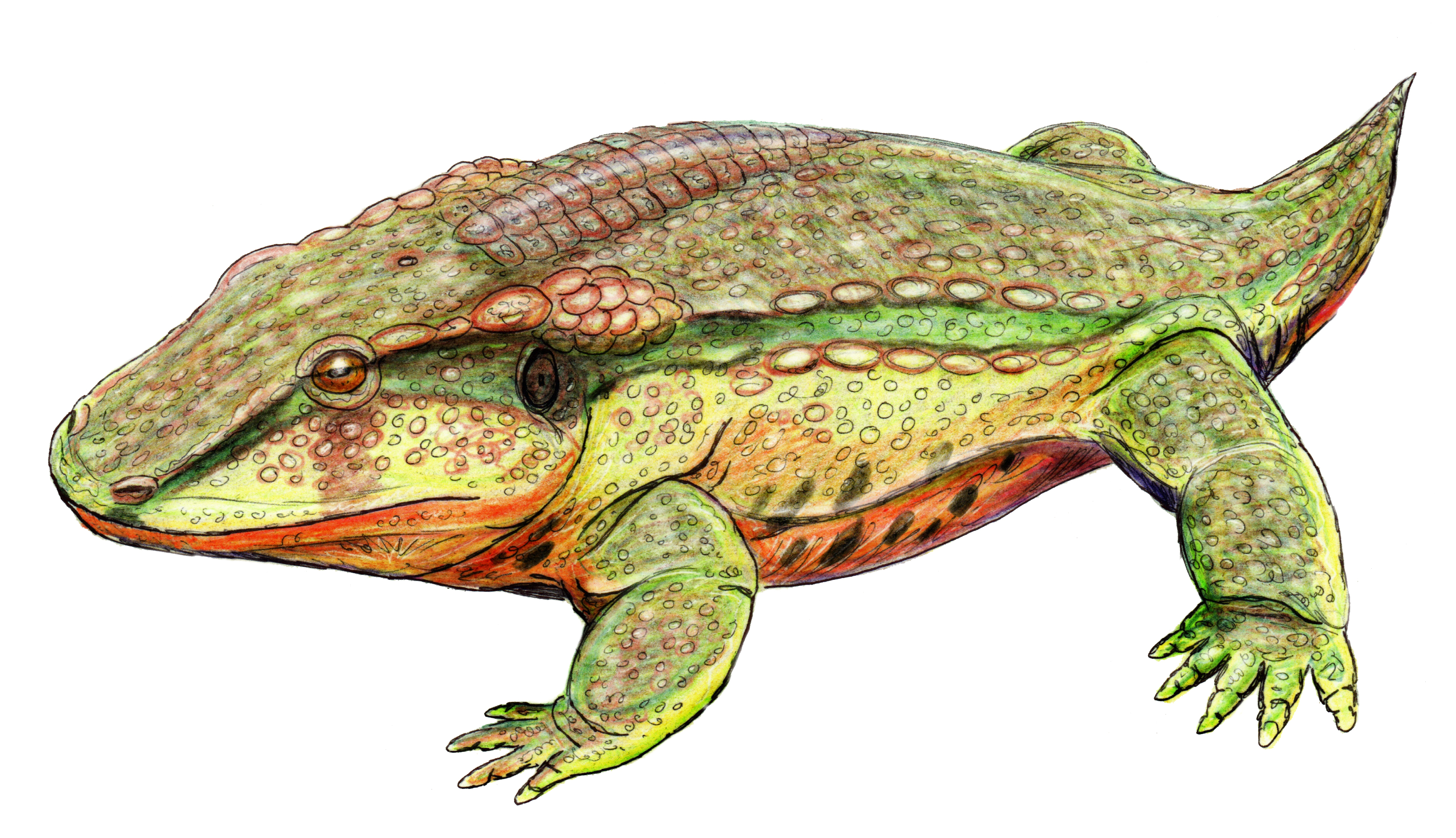

Scientific classification
- Kingdom: Animalia
- Phylum: Chordata
- Clade: Tetrapoda
- Order: †Temnospondyli
- Family: †Dissorophidae
- Genus: †Anakamacops; Li and Cheng, 1999

Species
- †A. petrolicus Li and Cheng, 1999 (type)

= Anakamacops =

Anakamacops Temporal range: Guadalupian, 270 Ma

Genus of amphibians (fossil)

Anakamacops (meaning "similar to Kamacops" in Greek) is a genus of dissorophid temnospondyl from the Middle Permian of China.

== History of study ==
The holotype (IGCAGS V365) of the type species, A. petrolicus, is a partial right side of the snout from the Dashankou locality of the Qingtoushan (formerly Xidagou) Formation, which is within the city of Yumen. The generic epithet is derived from the Greek ana ('similar') for its similarity to the Russian dissorophid Kamacops, while the specific epithet derives from petrolic because Yumen is an oil-producing city. More substantial material from the type locality, including a partial skull and partial hemimandibles, was described by Liu (2018).

== Anatomy ==
Most of the data on Anakamacops comes from the referred specimens described by Liu (2018). The referred skull (IVPP V 23862) is incomplete but substantially more complete than the holotype, with which is shares no skeletal overlap. As preserved, the referred skull measures 26 cm in length and was estimated to be around 40 cm when complete based on the proportions of Cacops; this would make this individual the largest known dissorophid. Liu revised the diagnosis of the taxon by a combination of features, including: (1) knobby extoses on the skull roof and hemimandible; (2) a tall suborbital bar that is more than half the height of the skull; (3) a closed otic notch; (4) a widely separate interpterygoid vacuity and choana; (5) a low coronoid process; and (6) a medial ridge of the adductor fossa that is close to the ventral margin of the hemimandible. It is differentiated from Iratusaurus, Kamacops, and Zygosaurus by having an otic notch that is anteroposteriorly longer than it is mediolaterally wide. A number of potentially unique features were suggested, such as a relatively edentulous (lacking teeth) vomer and paired (rather than a single, unpaired) occipital ridge. The vomerine dentition (or lack thereof) is the only morphological feature connecting the holotype and IVPP V 23862.

IVPP V 23862 also preserves the only postcrania referred to the taxon, with two osteoderms and one intercentrum included in the specimen. The osteoderm appears to be similar to dissorophids like Aspidosaurus and Cacops in fusing to the top of the spine; one osteoderm is triangular, rather than rectangular, which suggests an anteriormost position.

== Phylogenetic relationships ==
Anakamacops has historically been grouped with other middle-late Permian dissorophids like Iratusaurus, Kamacops, and Zygosaurus, although only Kamacops is known to a similar degree. Liu's phylogenetic analysis recovered these taxa in a clade that was defined as Kamacopini. Parioxys has sometimes been placed in this grouping as well, although other analyses recover different topologies.

=== Phylogenetic analysis from Liu (2018) ===
- Dissorophidae
  - Platyhystrix rugosus
  - - Aspidosaurus binasser
    - - Dissorophinae
        - Broiliellus reiszi
        - - Broiliellus brevis
          - - Broiliellus texensis
            - - Broiliellus olsoni
              - Dissorophus multicinctus
      - - - - Brevidorsum profundum
            - Reiszerpeton renascentis
          - - Conjunctio multidens
            - Scapanops neglecta
    - - Eucacopinae
        - - Cacops aspidephorus
          - Cacops morrisi
          - Cacops woehri
        - Kamacopini
          - Zygosaurus lucius
          - - Kamacops acervalis
            - Anakamacops petrolicus
