= Reiszerpeton =

Reiszerpeton Temporal range: Early Permian

Scientific classification
- Domain: Eukaryota
- Kingdom: Animalia
- Phylum: Chordata
- Order: †Temnospondyli
- Family: †Dissorophidae
- Genus: †Reiszerpeton; Maddin et al., 2013

Type species
- †Reiszerpeton renascentis Maddin et al., 2013

Extinct genus of amphibians

Reiszerpeton is an extinct genus of dissorophid temnospondyl known from the Early Permian Archer City Formation of Texas. It is known solely from the holotype, MCZ 1911, a complete skull. This specimen was originally referred to the amphibamiform Tersomius texensis. A reappraisal of the holotype of T. texensis and a number of other referred specimens by Maddin et al. (2013) noted a number of differences from both T. texensis and amphibamiforms more broadly that suggested affinities with the Dissorophidae. This was confirmed by a phylogenetic analysis, which placed it as the sister taxon to the Eucacopinae (Cacops + Zygosaurus + Kamacops). Reiszerpeton is known only from the type species, R. renascentis, which was named for Canadian paleontologist Robert Reisz. The species name refers to the recognition of Reisz as a "renaissance paleontologist." It is differentiated from other dissorophids by its small size, small and more numerous maxillary teeth, smooth cranial ornamentation, and greater distance between the orbit and the otic notch.

== Phylogeny ==
Below is the 50% majority rule consensus tree from Maddin et al. (2013):

- - - Micromelerpeton
  - - - Platyrhinops
      - Doleserpeton
    - - Trematopidae
        - Fedexia
        - - Ecolsonia
          - - Tambachia
            - Anconastes
            - - Phonerpeton
              - Acheloma
      - Dissorophidae
        - Platyhystrix
        - - Aspidosaurus
          - - - Conjunctio
              - - Dissorophus
                - - Broiliellus olsoni
                  - - Broiliellus texensis
                    - - Broiliellus brevis
                      - Broiliellus reiszi
            - - Brevidorsum
              - - Rio Arriba taxon
                - - Admiral taxon
                  - - Reiszerpeton renascentis
                    - - Cacops aspidephorus
                      - Cacops morrisi
                      - - Kamacops
                        - Zygosaurus
