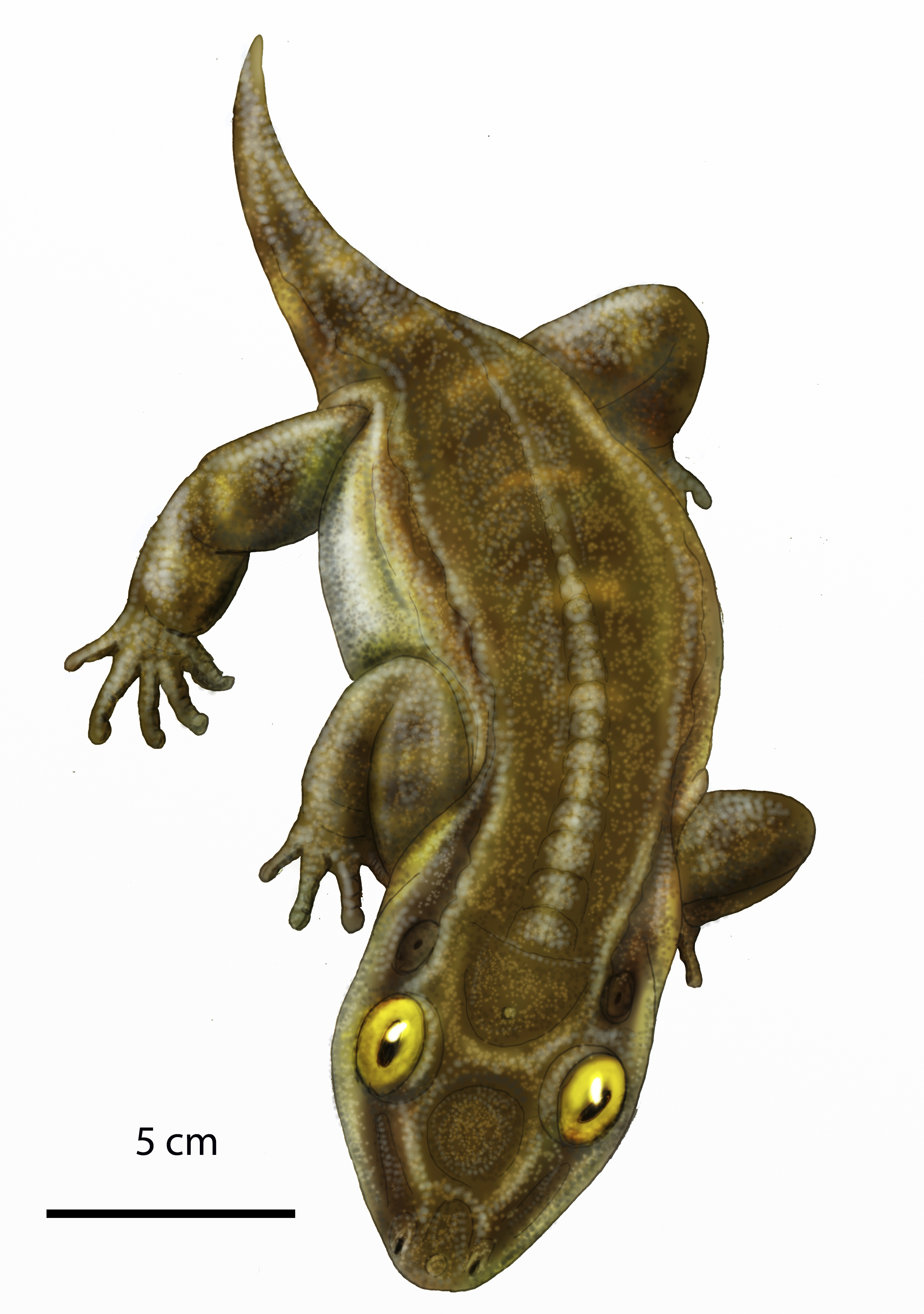
- Life restoration

Scientific classification
- Domain: Eukaryota
- Kingdom: Animalia
- Phylum: Chordata
- Order: †Temnospondyli
- Family: †Dissorophidae
- Clade: †Eucacopinae
- Genus: †Scapanops; Schoch & Sues, 2013

Type species
- †Scapanops neglecta Schoch & Sues, 2013

= Scapanops =

Scapanops Temporal range: Early Permian

Extinct genus of amphibians

Scapanops is an extinct genus of dissorophid temnospondyl amphibian known from the Early Permian Nocona Formation of north-central Texas, United States. It contains only the type species Scapanops neglecta, which was named by Rainer R. Schoch and Hans-Dieter Sues in 2013. Scapanops differs from other dissorophids in having a very small skull table, which means that its eye sockets are unusually close to the back of the skull. The eye sockets are also very large and spaced far apart. Scapanops was probably small-bodied (around 25 to 50 centimetres (9.8 to 19.7 in) long) with a proportionally large head and short trunk and tail. Like other dissorophids, it probably spent most of its life on land.

== Description ==
The only known skull of Scapanops is 7.9 centimetres (3.1 in) long. Scapanops is distinguished from other dissorophids by five unique features or autapomorphies: a large spacing between the orbits or eye sockets, giving the skull an oval-shaped outline; a very small skull table behind the orbits; a long snout twice as long as the skull table and proportionally longer than that of any other dissorophid; a jaw joint (the quadrate condyle) positioned farther forward on the skull than it is in other dissorophids; and a skull roof that is covered in small ridges, but not pits as in most other dissorophids. It shares several features (synapomorphies) with the dissorophids Conjunctio and Cacops, including and bony plates called osteoderms that are fused to the vertebrae. The osteoderms form a single row along the back. Scapanops and Conjunctio both have numerous small teeth lining their jaws, suggesting that they ate small prey. Other closely related dissorophids have fewer and larger teeth, meaning that they probably ate larger prey.

== Discovery ==
Scapanops is known from a single holotype specimen from the Nocona Formation, which is part of the Early Permian red beds of Texas. It includes most of the skull as well as the humerus, radius, and clavicle bones, which are preserved underneath the skull. Several vertebrae, ribs, and osteoderms are also known. The fossil, now housed in the Museum of Comparative Zoology at Harvard University, was discovered by American paleontologist Alfred Romer on April 15, 1950 and was first mentioned in the scientific literature by paleontologist Robert L. Carroll in 1964. During this time it was thought to belong to the species Conjunctio multidens. In 2013 the specimen was recognized to belong to a separate genus, which was named Scapanops after the spade-like shape of its skull (from the Greek skapane). The suffix -ops is meant to associate it with the genus Cacops, a closely related dissorophid. The specific name neglecta references the neglected status of the holotype specimen after its initial description in 1964.

== Relationships ==
A phylogenetic analysis of dissorophids published in 2013 found Scapanops to be one of the most basal members of a clade called Eucacopinae. Eucacopines are characterized by their lightly built skeletons and knobby skulls. The most basal eucacopine was found to be Conjunctio while Scapanops was positioned close to a derived clade of eucacopines that includes the genus Cacops (which is also from the Early Permian of the southwestern United States) and the Russian genera Zygosaurus and Kamacops. While members of the derived eucacopine clade have two rows of osteoderms down their backs, Scapanops and Conjunctio have only a single row of osteoderms down their backs. A single row of osteoderms is thought to be the ancestral condition for the dissorophid clade including Eucacopinae and its sister taxon Dissorophinae. Like the derived eucacopines, dissorophines also have two rows of osteoderms, meaning that the feature evolved independently in both groups and that Scapanops represents the point in eucacopine evolution before the two rows of osteoderms appeared. Below is a cladogram from the 2013 analysis:

- Dissorophidae
  - Platyhystrix
  - armored dissorophids
    - Aspidosaurus
    - - Dissorophinae
        - Dissorophus
        - - Broiliellus texensis
          - Broiliellus brevis
      - Eucacopinae
        - Conjunctio
        - - Scapanops
          - derived eucacopines
            - Cacops aspidephorus
            - Cacops morrisi
            - Cacops woehri
            - - Kamacops
              - Zygosaurus
