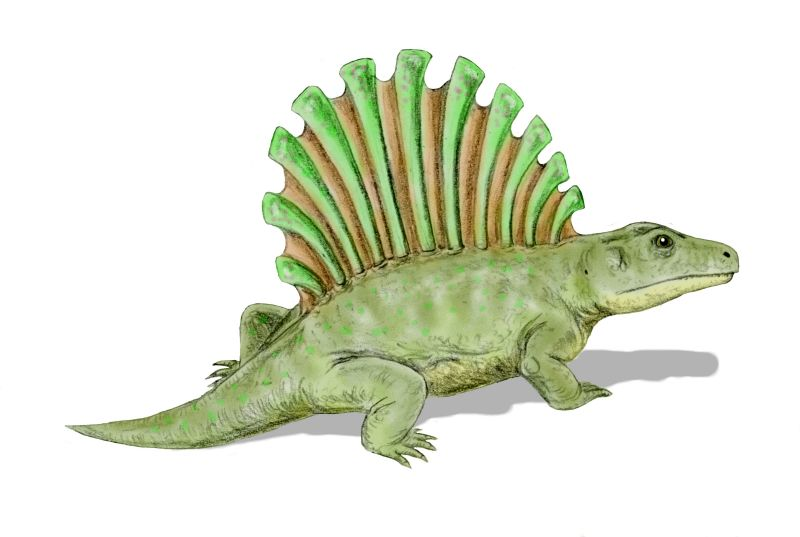
- Life reconstruction

Scientific classification
- Kingdom: Animalia
- Phylum: Chordata
- Clade: Tetrapoda
- Order: †Temnospondyli
- Family: †Dissorophidae
- Genus: †Platyhystrix; Williston, 1911
- Species: †P. rugosus

Binomial name
- †Platyhystrix rugosus (Case, 1910)

Synonyms
- Zatrachys apicalis Case, 1910

= Platyhystrix =

Platyhystrix Temporal range: Latest Pennsylvanian (Late Gzhelian) - Early Permian, 299–279.5 Ma

Genus of amphibians (fossil)

Platyhystrix (from Greek: πλατύς platús, 'flat' and Greek: ῠ̔́στρῐξ hústrix, 'porcupine') is an extinct temnospondyl amphibian with a distinctive sail along its back, similar to the unrelated synapsids, Dimetrodon and Edaphosaurus. It lived during the boundary between the latest Carboniferous and earliest Permian periods throughout what is now known as the Four Corners, Texas, and Kansas about 300 million years ago.

Not much is known about Platyhystrix, with a majority of the fossils found composed of the distinct neural spines, and fractured skull fragments. There is only one species within the genus, Platyhystrix rugosus. Its phylogenetic relationships to other members of the family Dissorophidae have been debated in recent years, due to its unique cranial features, and recent discoveries as to the origins of modern day lissamphibians. Synonyms and alternate spellings include: Zatrachys apicalis, Ctenosaurus rugosus, Platyhystryx, Platyhistryx.

== History of discovery ==
The holotype of Platyhystrix (AMNH FARB 4785) was first discovered in the Early Permian Cutler formation in Rio Arribas Co, New Mexico in 1881 by American paleontologist, E.D. Cope. The holotype consisted of a few fragmented neural spines, and was initially listed under the species name, Zatrachys apicalis. In 1910, American paleontologist E.C. Case reclassified the neural spines as belonging to a new species of the pelycosaurian reptile Ctenosaurus, Ctenosaurus rugosus (the specific name means "wrinkled, shriveled"), since they resembled spines from Texas belonging to C. koeneni, described by Friedrich von Huene.

In Case's description of the Platyhystrix holotype, he initially classified it as part of a new reptile specimen, but still noted tubercles along the neural spines which were similar to the projections found on amphibian skulls. It was S.W. Williston who created the genus in 1911, and placed it within the Temnospondyli order once fractured skull elements were described in 1916.

== Description ==
=== Skull ===
Compared to other dissorophid temnospondyls, Platyhystrix's skull is rather large (over 19 cm long along midline), as well as long and narrow when analyzed in dorsal view. There is a wide variety in dermal sculpturing which occurs along the dorsal and lateral portions of the skull. Large ridges and tubercle-like processes are present along the dorsal half of the orbital rim, edges of the skull table, and areas which adjoin the cheek. Nodular-like processes are most pronounced on the posterior portion of the skull roof, on the postorbital, squamosal, supratemporal, and tabular. The central dorsal portion of the skull is characterized by a reticulated pitting pattern, which becomes finer as it extends towards the nasals. These kinds of dermal ornamentation are what diagnose Platyhystrix from other members of Dissorophidae. Based on marginal dentition and preserved portions of the premaxilla, Platyhystrix may have had upwards of 65 teeth on either side of the upper jaw, in the form of simple, pointed pegs.

Other diagnostic features of the skull include: long and narrow nasals, whose length is equivalent to approximately one third of the midline length of the skull; posteriorly closed otic notch; parietal is large and extends anteriorly beyond margin of orbit; parietals are longer than the frontals; postfrontal length is greater than twice its width and equal to the length of the supratemporal; cheek is steeply inclined and meets the skull table at nearly right angle.

=== Dorsal Blades ===
The most notable characteristic of Platyhystrix is its elongated neural spines. Initially, these "spines" were thought to be an extension of the neural arch above the transverse process. However, the reassignment of Platyhystrix to the armored Dissorophidae clade and the blade's extensive ornamentation led Vaughn in 1971 to reinterpret this feature as an osteoderm that was fused to the true neural spine instead. This reclassification suggested a superficial convergence with the neural spines present in synapsids. Histological analysis revealed that the dorsal blades of Platyhystrix do indeed share histological features and were likely homologous with the internal osteoderm series present in other dissorophids. This evidence points to the blades being of dermal origin, and are a novel example of dermal-endochondral co-ossification in a Paleozoic tetrapod.

It is estimated that the notable sail was made up of a range of 11-15 laterally compressed and distally expanded blades. Most of the distal length of these dorsal blades is covered with ridges and pustules, similar to the dermal ornamentation seen on the skull. Similar to Edaphosaurus, a paired set of lateral tubercles can be found proximally on the blade, and while some spines curve anteriorly, the rest exhibit severe curving toward the pelvis.

The purpose of the blades still remains unknown, although many theories have been postulated over the years. The use of the sail for thermoregulation, sexual dimorphism, and species identification are all hypotheses that have been applied to other sail-bearing taxa. A speculation more specifically related to Platyhystrix is that these neural spines could have served to stiffen the vertebral column in order to adapt to a more terrestrial lifestyle.

== Paleobiology ==
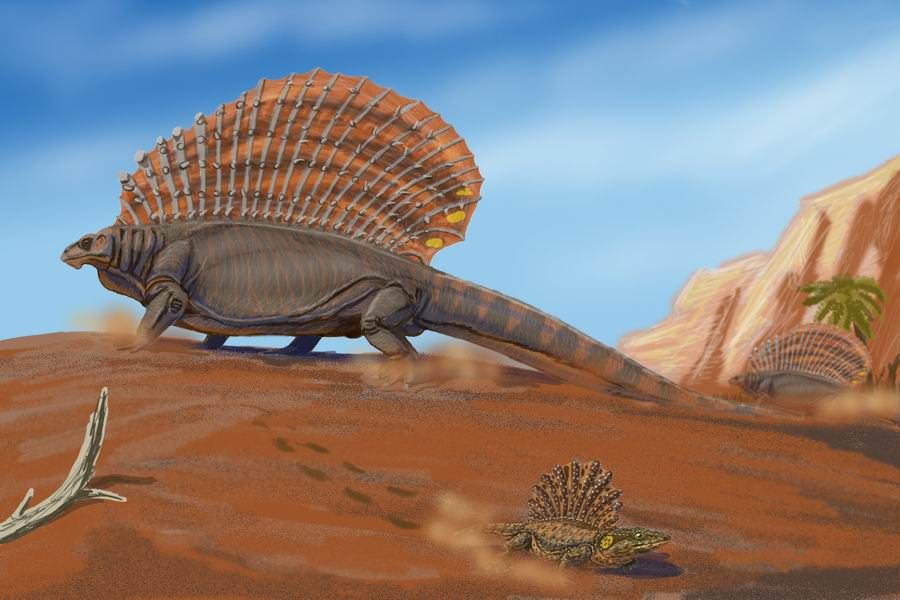
Platyhystrix (small, foreground) and Edaphosaurus

Platyhystrix may have been preyed upon by larger temnospondyls such as Eryops, or by larger carnivorous reptiles, which were becoming more common and diverse in the drier climate of the Permian. The skull was large and strongly built, with a frog-like face. Platyhystrix had a compact body, reaching 1 metre (3.3 ft) long including the tail, and its short, sturdy legs indicate a mainly terrestrial life.

Platyhystrix appeared rather unusual: the dorsal vertebrae were extraordinarily lengthened, and in life they probably formed a skin-covered sail. This structure was possibly for thermal regulation, as in other animals of similar appearance, such as the pelycosaurs Dimetrodon and Edaphosaurus. The back of Platyhystrix was also covered with thick hard plates, similar to those of its near relative, Cacops.

== Stratigraphic and geographic range ==
Platyhystrix is primarily known from Early Permian formations from the southwestern United States. They are the most common rhachitomous amphibian fossils found in Wolfcampian age formations (~295-280 mya.), with one exception being El Cobre Canyon in north-central New Mexico, which has been debated as being dated around the early Permian or late Pennsylvanian (a stage of the Late Carboniferous).

The best casting of neural spines comes from the Cutler Formation in southwestern Colorado. The part of the formation in which the specimens were collected were confidently identified as belonging to the Wolfcampian age of the Early Permian, with the sediment composition denoting the presence of an ancient lake or river.

Additional neural spines have been found in sites scattered around New Mexico, southeastern Utah, and southwestern Colorado. Vaughn further describes one of the most productive regions of the Early Permian Cutler Formation as the "Platyhystrix pocket" during his field work there in 1962, due to the diversity and number of well preserved specimens found in the red sandstone. Although this site was named for the fossil, only a few neural spines and a rib bone were discovered.

The best cranial specimen was found by David Baldwin near Rio Puerco, New Mexico in 1881. The presence of a fragmented neural spine on the skull's ventral surface indicated that it did indeed belong to a Platyhystrix specimen. Although found in the 19th century, it would take another 100 years for the specimen to be described by David Berman in 1981.

== Paleoecology ==
New Mexico, and other states in the Rocky Mountain regions, were situated about ten degrees north of the equator, on the western edge of Pangea during the Early Permian. Throughout the Wolfcampian stage, most of northern and central New Mexico was composed of rivers which emptied into a shallow sea. The rivers that deposited the Abo Formation were made of fine silt beds, and were up to 8 m deep and 50 m wide, and reflect semi-arid and semi-humid conditions suggested by paleosols found on adjacent floodplains. These river size estimations infer a yearly precipitation rate between 30–100 cm/year.

The vertebrate and plant fossil composition of these areas also provide insights as to the relative paleoclimate which supported these communities. The infrequent paleoflora (conifers, seed ferns, and Walchia) found in these areas are all species known to be adapted to xerophytic (dry) conditions. It is also believed that these kinds of plants began to dominate the American Southwest as the Early Permian climate trended toward drier and more seasonal conditions. Vertebrate fossils found at these Wolfcampian sites consist of fish, amphibians, and reptiles, including charismatic pelycosaur reptiles such as Edaphosaurus. The presence of large ectotherms, assuming that these extant reptiles are similar to modern day species, hints at a daytime temperature range between 25-41 °C, and not dropping below 5 °C in the winter season.

== Phylogeny ==
Platyhystrix's relationship within and amongst the Dissorophidae family has been highly contested since its discovery and description. Carroll and DeMar spent the 1960s attempting to explain the relationships amongst the wide variety of genera within the family, and while their phylogenies depicted differing conclusions, they had reached a general consensus when it came to the basal versus advanced groupings. While the skull described by Berman in 1981 was able to provide better context, DeMar's logic placed Platyhystrix as more structurally advanced than other Wolfcampian dissorophids. Carroll's logic (based on vertebral armor evolution) placed P. rugosus at a more basal position amongst Permian dissorophids, with the closest sister taxon being Aspidosaurus of the late Pennsylvanian.

In 2012, Schoch produced the most comprehensive dissorophid temnospondyl phylogeny to date, analyzing 25 taxa and 70 characters in total. The result of this analysis placed Platyhystrix and Aspidosaurus as successive sister taxa of all other dissorophids. Platyhystrix was separated from Aspidosaurus using two osteoderm characters, and this placement additionally agrees with the stratigraphy of fossil discovery.

More recently, new phylogenetic analyses have been produced in order to better understand the evolution of modern day lissamphibians, due to the increasing consensus that their monophyletic group is derived from Temnospondyli. In 2019, Atkins, Reisz, and Maddin used characters relating to braincase simplification over time to construct a new phylogeny of lissamphibian origin. Based on the characters used in parsimony analysis, Platyhystrix was noted as having a much more basal position relative to Schoch's findings, as a sister taxon to the Olsoniformes clade.

Cladogram produced by Schoch (2012):

- Dissorophoidea
  - Micromelerpetontidae
    - Micromelerpeton
  - - Amphibamidae
      - Platyrhinops
      - Doleserpeton
    - Olsoniformes
      - Trematopidae
        - Ecolsonia
        - Fedexia
        - - Tambachia
          - Anconastes
          - - Phonerpeton
            - Acheloma
      - Dissorophidae
        - Platyhystrix
        - - Aspidosaurus
          - - Conjunctio
            - Dissorophinae
              - Dissorophus
              - Broiliellus texensis
              - Broiliellus brevis
              - Broiliellus olsoni
            - Eucacopinae
              - Brevidorsum
              - - Admiral taxon (Scapanops)
                - Rio Arriba taxon (Conjunctio)
                - - Cacops morrisi
                  - Cacops aspidephorus
                  - - Kamacops
                    - Zygosaurus
