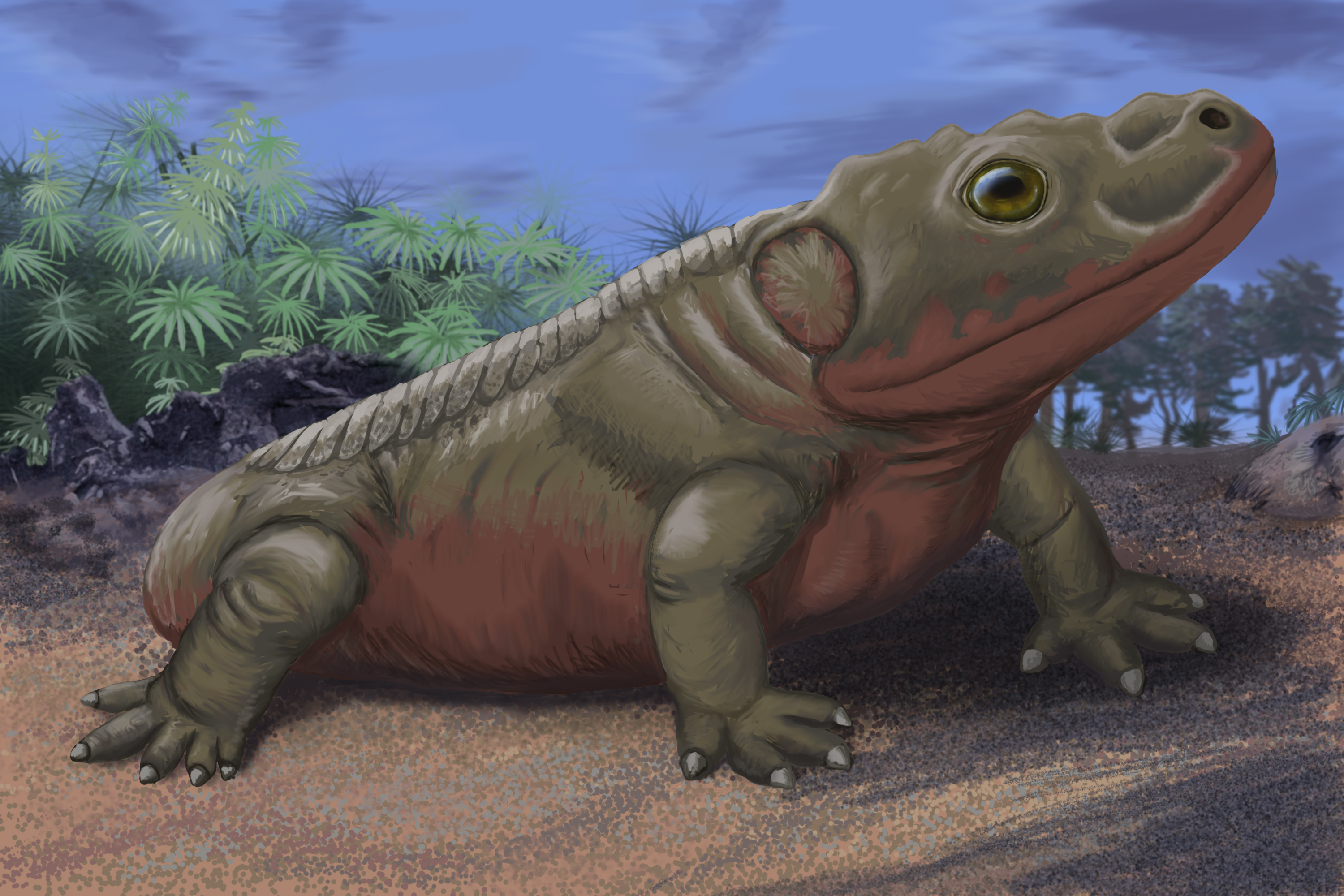
- Restoration of Broiliellus olsoni

Scientific classification
- Kingdom: Animalia
- Phylum: Chordata
- Clade: Tetrapoda
- Order: †Temnospondyli
- Family: †Dissorophidae
- Subfamily: †Dissorophinae
- Genus: †Broiliellus; Williston, 1914

Type species
- †Broiliellus texensis Williston, 1914

Species
- †B. arroyoensis DeMar, 1967; †B. brevis Carroll, 1964; †B. olsoni DeMar, 1967; †B. reiszi Holmes et al., 2013; †B. texensis Williston, 1914

= Broiliellus =

Broiliellus Temporal range: Early Permian

Extinct genus of amphibians

Broiliellus is an extinct genus of dissorophoid temnospondyl within the family Dissorophidae. Broiliellus is most closely related to the genus Dissorophus, and both have been placed in the subfamily Dissorophinae. Broiliellus is known from five species from the Early Permian: the type species is Broiliellus texensis, and the other species are Broiliellus brevis, Broiliellus olsoni, Broiliellus arroyoensis, and Broiliellus reiszi. An additional species, Broiliellus novomexicanus, which was originally named Aspidosaurus novomexicanus, is now thought to fall outside the genus as a member of the subfamily Eucacopinae.

== History of study ==
Broiliellus was first named by American paleontologist S.W. Williston in 1914 based on two nearly complete skulls in articulation with postcranial material from the early Permian of Texas; this species was given the name Broiliellus texensis, the genus name being for the German paleontologist Ferdinand Broili, and the species name being for the geographic provenance. The holotype is currently reposited in the Field Museum. A second species, Broiliellus brevis, from the Archer City bonebed in Texas was named in 1964 by Canadian paleontologist Robert Carroll; the holotype of this species is currently reposited in the Museum of Comparative Zoology. Two more species were named in 1967 by American paleontologist Robert DeMar, Broiliellus olsoni and Broiliellus arroyoensis, both from Texas. The most recent species to be described was Broiliellus reiszi in 2013 by Canadian paleontologist Robert Holmes and colleagues.

== Phylogeny ==
The phylogenetic analysis of Schoch (2012) found that Broiliellus was most closely related to Dissorophus. However, the three species of Broiliellus did not form their own clade, but rather a polytomy (unresolved evolutionary relationship) with Dissorophus.

Holmes et al. (2013) named a new species of Broiliellus, Broiliellus reiszi. They performed two phylogenetic analyses using the data matrix of Schoch (2012). This analysis yielded more resolved topology and a monophyletic Broiliellus. Below is the cladogram from that analysis:

- Dissorophoidea
  - Micromelerpetontidae
    - Micromelerpeton
  - - Amphibamidae
      - Platyrhinops
      - Doleserpeton
    - Olsoniformes
      - Trematopidae
        - Fedexia
        - - Ecolsonia
          - - Tambachia
            - Anconastes
            - - Phonerpeton
              - Acheloma
      - Dissorophidae
        - Platyhystrix
        - - Aspidosaurus
          - - Brevidorsum
            - Dissorophinae
              - Dissorophus
              - - Broiliellus olsoni
                - - Broiliellus texensis
                  - - Broiliellus brevis
                    - Broiliellus reiszi
            - Eucacopinae
              - Conjunctio
              - Rio Arriba taxon
              - - Admiral taxon
                - - Cacops aspidephorus
                  - Cacops morrisi
                  - Cacops woehri
                  - - Kamacops
                    - Zygosaurus
