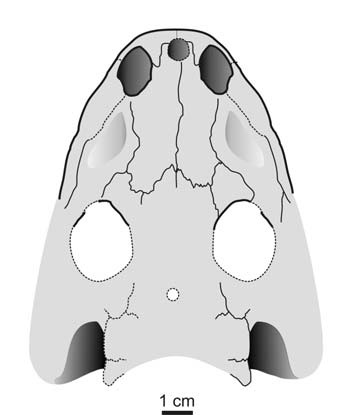
- Aspidosaurus Skull

Scientific classification
- Kingdom: Animalia
- Phylum: Chordata
- Clade: Tetrapoda
- Order: †Temnospondyli
- Family: †Dissorophidae
- Genus: †Aspidosaurus; Broili, 1904

Species
- †A. chiton Broili, 1904 (type); †A. apicalis; †A. crucifer; †A. glascocki; †A. binasser Berman and Lucas, 2003

Synonyms
- Alegeinosaurus Case, 1911

= Aspidosaurus =

Aspidosaurus Temporal range: Late Carboniferous - Early Permian

Extinct genus of amphibians

Aspidosaurus is an extinct genus of dissorophoid temnospondyl within the family Dissorophidae.

== Description ==
Like other dissorophids, Aspidosaurus species had a single row of plates formed by expansions of the neural spines.

== Taxonomy ==
In 1911, Paul Miller discovered the remains of various dissorophid bones in New Mexico that were attributed to a new species, Aspidosaurus novomexicanus. The skull closely resembled that of a specimen of Cacops aspidephorus found in Texas but the arrangement of ridges in the otic region was different. The teeth found were slender and conical and all of an approximately equal size. The vertebral column, pelvis and limb bones were also similar but the new specimen was distinguished from Cacops by the armour, the single row of vertical plates that were originally attached to the neural spines of the vertebrae. A. novomexicanus was later attributed to the genus Broiliellus. More recently, "A." novomexicanus has been removed from Broiliellus and classified as a closer relative of Cacops. The original specimen is now housed in the University of California Museum of Paleontology and is referred to as the "Rio Arriba taxon" because of its uncertain phylogenetic placement.

The genus Alegeinosaurus Case, 1911 was synonymized with Aspidosaurus by Gee (2018) based on a redescription of the holotype.

== Phylogeny ==
Below is a cladogram from Schoch (2012) in which valid Aspidosaurus species are found to be basal dissorophids and "Aspidosaurus" novomexicanus -the Rio Arriba taxon- nests within the subfamily Cacopinae:

- Dissorophoidea
  - Micromelerpetontidae
    - Micromelerpeton
  - - Amphibamidae
      - Platyrhinops
      - Doleserpeton
    - Olsoniformes
      - Trematopidae
        - Ecolsonia
        - Fedexia
        - - Tambachia
          - Anconastes
          - - Phonerpeton
            - Acheloma
      - Dissorophidae
        - Platyhystrix
        - Aspidosaurus
        - - Conjunctio
          - Dissorophinae
            - Dissorophus
            - Broiliellus texensis
            - Broiliellus brevis
            - Broiliellus olsoni
          - Cacopinae
            - Brevidorsum
            - - Admiral taxon
              - Rio Arriba taxon
              - - Cacops morrisi
                - Cacops aspidephorus
                - - Kamacops
                  - Zygosaurus
