= Astreptorhachis =

Astreptorhachis Temporal range: Late Carboniferous

Scientific classification
- Kingdom: Animalia
- Phylum: Chordata
- Clade: Tetrapoda
- Order: †Temnospondyli
- Family: †Dissorophidae
- Genus: †Astreptorhachis; Vaughn, 1971

Type species
- Astreptorhachis ohioensis Vaughn, 1971

Extinct genus of amphibians

Astreptorhachis is an extinct genus of Late Carboniferous dissorophid temnospondyl. It is known only from one species, Astreptorhachis ohioensis, that was collected from the Casselman Formation in Jefferson County, Ohio by the Ohio Geological Survey in 1953 and described by Peter Vaughn in 1971. The holotype and only known specimen consists of a few neural spines and is currently reposited in the Smithsonian Museum of Natural History. The genus name derives from the Greek words astreptos ("inflexible") and rhachis ("backbone"). The specimen was recognized as being similar to the dissorophid Platyhystrix rugosa from the southwestern United States in having greatly elongate neural spines,although subsequent work on P. rugosa has revealed that the spine is not particularly elongate, instead being capped by an elongate osteoderm. Astreptorhachis is differentiated from Platyhystrix by the fusion of successive neural spines and the extensively developed tubercles that cover the external surfaces. It is speculated that the elongation of the spines served to stiffen the backbone, being advantageous for terrestrial locomotion, but the purpose of the fusion of successive spines remained unclear in the absence of other material of this taxon.

== See also ==
- Prehistoric amphibian
- List of prehistoric amphibians
