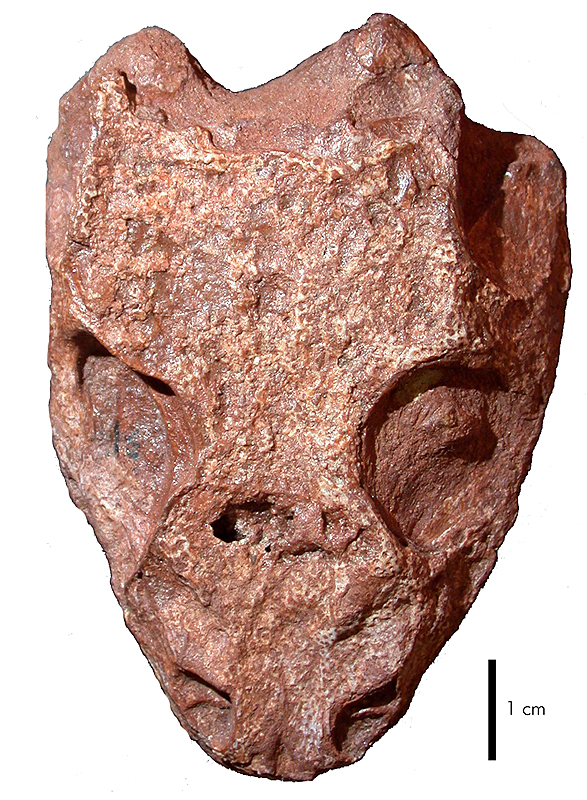

Scientific classification
- Kingdom: Animalia
- Phylum: Chordata
- Clade: Tetrapoda
- Order: †Temnospondyli
- Family: †Dissorophidae
- Genus: †Conjunctio; Carroll, 1964

Type species
- †Cunjunctio multidens Carroll, 1964

= Conjunctio =

Conjunctio Temporal range: 299–270 Ma Lower Permian

Extinct genus of amphibians

Conjunctio is an extinct genus of dissorophid temnospondyl amphibian from the early Permian of New Mexico. The type species, Conjunctio multidens, was named by paleontologist Robert L. Carroll in 1964.

== History of study ==
The holotype specimen was found in 1911 in the Lower Permian Abo Formation in New Mexico. It consists of the skull and postcranial material including femora, humeri, scapulae, pelvis, a section of the vertebral column, and osteoderms. It was originally described by Case et al. (1913) as a referred specimen of Aspidosaurus (sometimes "Broiliellus") novomexicanus but was subsequently determined to be a distinct species by Carroll (1964). Carroll also identified a third specimen of Conjunctio, which he did not refer specifically to C. multidens; this was subsequently referred to as the "Admiral Taxon" (because it came from the Admiral Formation of Texas) by most workers until it was formalized as a distinct genus and species, Scapanops neglecta, by Schoch & Sues (2013). These authors also provided an updated description and illustration of C. multidens.

== Phylogenetic position ==
Conjunctio is typically recovered as a basal eucacopine.

- Dissorophidae
  - Platyhystrix
  - - Aspidosaurus
    - - Dissorophinae
        - Dissorophus
        - - Broiliellus texensis
          - Broiliellus brevis
      - Eucacopinae
        - Conjunctio
        - - Scapanops
          - - Cacops aspidephorus
            - Cacops morrisi
            - Cacops woehri
            - - Kamacops
              - Zygosaurus
