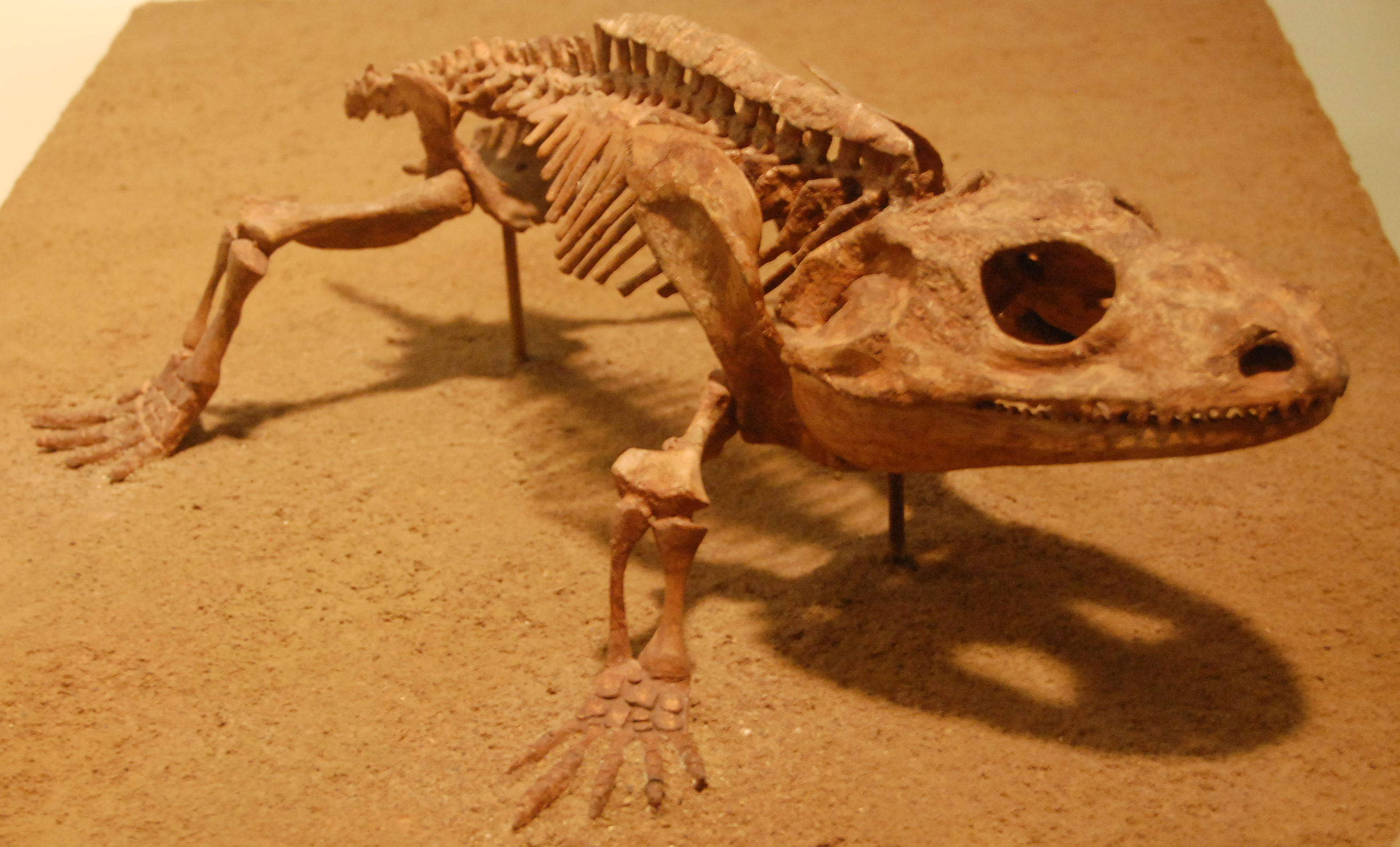
- Skeleton of Cacops in the Field Museum

Scientific classification
- Kingdom: Animalia
- Phylum: Chordata
- Clade: Tetrapoda
- Order: †Temnospondyli
- Clade: †Olsoniformes
- Family: †Dissorophidae; Boulenger, 1902

Subgroups
- See text.

Synonyms
- Aspidosauridae; Otocoelidae; Stegopidae

= Dissorophidae =

Dissorophidae Temporal range: Late Carboniferous–Middle Permian, 301–270 Ma

Extinct family of temnospondyls

Dissorophidae is an extinct family of medium-sized temnospondyls that flourished during the late Carboniferous and early Permian periods. The clade is known almost exclusively from North America.

== History of study ==
Dissorophidae is a diverse clade that was named in 1902 by George A. Boulenger. Junior synonyms include Otocoelidae, Stegopidae, and Aspidosauridae. Early in the study of dissorophoids when the relationships of different taxa were not well-resolved and most taxa had not been described, Dissorophidae sometimes came to include taxa that are now not regarded as dissorophids and may have excluded earlier described taxa that are now regarded as dissorophids. Amphibamiforms were widely regarded as small-bodied dissorophids, and at one point, Dissorophidae was also suggested to also include Trematopidae.

=== 19th century ===
In 1895, American paleontologist Edward Drinker Cope named Dissorophus from the early Permian of Texas. This was the first dissorophid to be described as such, although Parioxys, named by Cope in 1878, and Zygosaurus, named by the Russian paleontologist Karl von Eichwald in 1848, have also been regarded as dissorophids. A second species of Dissorophus as well as both species of the genus Otocoelus that were all named in 1896 by Cope in two papers are now regarded as junior synonyms of the type species of Dissorophus, D. multicinctus.

=== 20th century ===
The early 20th century saw a large expansion in the study of dissorophids. In 1904, German paleontologist Ferdinand Broili named the first species of Aspidosaurus, A. chiton, from the early Permian of Texas. Additional species of Aspidosaurus were named shortly thereafter, including Aspidosaurus glascocki from the early Permian of Texas and Aspidosaurus novomexicanus from the late Carboniferous of New Mexico. A third species, "Aspidosaurus crucifer" described by American paleontologist E.C. Case is now regarded as an indeterminate aspidosaurine. In 1910, two of the best-known dissorophid genera were named: Cacops aspidephorus and Platyhystrix (as a species of Ctenosaurus; proper name erected in 1911). Case also provided new information on Dissorophus in 1910. In 1911, Case named Alegeinosaurus aphthitos from the early Permian of Texas. In 1914, Samuel W. Williston described the first species of Broiliellus, B. texensis. Additional information on Parioxys ferricolus was provided in two studies by Egyptian paleontologist Y.S. Moustafa in 1955.

The 1960s were a particular productive time for dissorophid research. In two separate papers published in 1964, Canadian paleontologist Robert L. Carroll named four new taxa: Brevidorsum profundum, Broiliellus brevis, and Parioxys bolli from the early Permian of Texas and Conjunctio multidens from the early Permian of New Mexico. Conjunctio was named from a specimen originally referred to Aspidosaurus novomexicanus by Case et al. (1913) that was also placed in Broiliellus by American paleontologist Wann Langston in 1953 before being divided again by Carroll. In 1965, American paleontologist E.C. Olson described the first and only middle Permian dissorophid from North America, Fayella chickashaensis, on the basis of an isolated braincase and isolated fragments. A large postcranial skeleton from a different locality was referred to this taxon by Olson in 1972. In 1966, American paleontologist Robert E. DeMar named a new taxon, "Longiscitula houghae" from the early Permian of Texas; this is now regarded as a junior synonym of Dissorophus multicinctus by British paleontologist Andrew Milner. DeMar also provided the first synthesis of the morphological diversity and possible function of dissorophid osteoderms in 1966 and named two new species of Broiliellus in 1967, B. arroyoensis and B. olsoni, and completed a detailed revision of D. multicinctus in 1968.

In 1971, American paleontologist Peter Vaughn described one of the few dissorophids outside of New Mexico, Texas, and Oklahoma, Astreptorhachis ohioensis from the late Carboniferous of Ohio, represented by a series of fused neural spines and osteoderms. American paleontologist John Bolt published a survey of dissorophid osteoderms in 1974 with an emphasis on taxonomic utility and differentiation and reports of material from the early Permian Richards Spur locality in Oklahoma; in 1977, Bolt reported Cacops from the locality. In 1980, Russian paleontologist Yuri Gubin described two new middle Permian dissorophids from Russia: Iratusaurus vorax and Kamacops acervalis. The most complete cranial material of Platyhystrix rugosus was described in 1981 by a team led by American paleontologist David Berman. Additional postcranial material of Platyhystrix, primarily the characteristic hyperelongate spines, was also periodically reported. The revision of Ecolsonia cutlerensis in 1985 by Berman and colleagues placed the taxon as a dissorophid, but this taxon is more often recovered as a trematopid. In 1999, Chinese paleontologists Li Jinling and Cheng Zhengwu described the first and only dissorophid from eastern Asia, the middle Permian Anakamacops petrolicus from China.

=== 21st century ===
In 2003, American paleontologists Berman and Spencer G. Lucas named a new species of Aspidosaurus from Texas, A. binasser. Two papers on the osteoderm biomechanics of Cacops aspidephorus and Dissorophus multicinctus, led by Canadian paleontologist David Dilkes, were published in 2007 and 2009. In 2009, a team led by Canadian paleontologist Robert Reisz described a new species of Cacops, C. morrisi, from the Richards Spur locality; additional material of this taxon was described in 2018 by American paleontologist Bryan M. Gee and Reisz. A second species from the locality was described in 2012 by German paleontologist Nadia B. Fröbisch and Reisz, C. woehri; additional material of Cacops woehri was described in 2015 by a team led by Fröbisch. A team led by German paleontologist Florian Witzmann published a comparative histology study that sampled a number of dissorophids in 2010. May et al. (2011) described material of Aspidosaurus from the late Carboniferous of the mid-continent of North America. The first phylogenetic review of the Dissorophidae was published in 2012 by Schoch. In 2013, three new dissorophids were named in a festschrift dedicated to Reisz in Comptes Rendus Palévol: Broiliellus reiszi from the early Permian of New Mexico in a study led by Canadian paleontologist Robert Holmes; Scapanops neglecta from the early Permian of Texas in a study by German paleontologists Schoch and Hans-Dieter Sues, re-evaluating a specimen historically referred to as the Admiral Taxon; and Reiszerpeton renascentis from the early Permian of Texas in a review of material referred to the amphibamiform Tersomius texensis by a team led by Canadian paleontologist Hillary C. Maddin. In 2018, Chinese paleontologist Liu Jun provided an updated osteology of Anakamacops based on substantially more complete material and erected the tribe Kamacopini to group the middle Permian dissorophids from Eurasia. Two separate studies led by Gee were also published that year, one reappraising the early Permian Alegeinosaurus aphthitos from Texas, which he suggested to be a junior synonym of Aspidosaurus, and another reappraising the middle Permian Fayella chickashaensis from Oklahoma, in which the authors determined that the holotype was a nomen dubium but that the referred specimen was sufficiently distinct to warrant erecting a new taxon, Nooxobeia gracilis. Also in 2018, Gee and Reisz reported postcrania of a large indeterminate dissorophid from Richards Spur, which was followed by another study the following year by a team led by Gee that reported extensive new material from several dissorophids from Richards Spur, including the first documentation of Aspidosaurus and Dissorophus from the locality.

== Anatomy ==
Dissorophids are most readily recognized for their distinctive osteoderms, although these are not unique to either dissorophids among temnospondyls or to temnospondyls among early tetrapods. It is also debated whether Platyhystrix has true osteoderms or simply ornamented neural spines with similar morphology to the ornamentation of osteoderms in other taxa. There is also great variability in the osteoderms, both in the number of series and in the overall proportions and anatomy. Dissorophines like Dissorophus typically possess wide osteoderms in contrast to eucacopines like Cacops. Both groups have two series of osteoderms that are relatively flat, in contrast to aspidosaurines, which purportedly a single series that is dorsally keeled to form an inverted-V morphology; it has been suggested, based on CT data, that at least some aspidosaurines may actually have two series of osteoderms but that one is largely obscured. Although osteoderm morphology has been shown to not exert a discernible influence on dissorophid phylogeny, osteoderms remain a major hallmark used to differentiate major clades within Dissorophidae and remain useful for establishing the monophyly of the group within Dissorophoidea. Schoch & Milner (2014) list several features that diagnose dissorophids, but most of these are only useful for differentiating the clade from the closely related trematopids, and some are outdated in light of newer research: (1) maxillary tooth row terminating at or anterior to the posterior orbital margin; (2) basipterygoid region firmly sutured; (3) no prefrontal-postfrontal contact; (4) absence of denticles on the basal plate of the parasphenoid; (5) no pterygoid-vomer contact; (6) short postorbital; (7) long and parallel-sided choana; and (8) absence of a supinator process.

Aspidosaurines and platyhystricines are represented largely by postcranial material, and thus features such as osteoderms are some of the only differentiators for these taxa, but dissorophines and eucacopiens also have many cranial differences, such as the relative proportions of the skull. Most dissorophids are medium-sized, being intermediate between the small amphibamiforms and the larger trematopids, but Dissorophidae includes the largest known dissorophoids, all from the middle Permian of Eurasia, with skull lengths exceeding 30 cm.

== Fossil range ==
Below is a timeline of the known fossil ranges of dissorophids.

== Relationships ==
Four subfamilies comprise the various dissorophids. Eucacopine (sensu Schoch & Sues, 2013) was traditionally referred to as Cacopinae and includes Cacops and the middle Permian Eurasian taxa (Anakamacops, Iratusaurus, Kamacops, Zygosaurus). Dissorophinae includes Dissorophus and all four species of Broiliellus. These are the two most widely utilized distinctions within Dissorophidae, although Aspidosaurinae (which includes only Aspidosaurus and indeterminate Aspidosaurus-like material) was recently revived along with the erection of the new Platyhystricinae (Platyhystrix and Astreptorhachis). The placement of some more poorly known (Brevidorsum) or anatomically distinct (Scapanops) taxa is less resolved.

== Phylogeny ==
Below is a cladogram from Schoch (2012):

- Dissorophoidea
  - Micromelerpetontidae
    - Micromelerpeton
  - - Amphibamidae
      - Platyrhinops
      - Doleserpeton
    - Olsoniformes
      - Trematopidae
        - Ecolsonia
        - Fedexia
        - - Tambachia
          - Anconastes
          - - Phonerpeton
            - Acheloma
      - Dissorophidae
        - Platyhystrix
        - - Aspidosaurus
          - - Conjunctio
            - Dissorophinae
              - Dissorophus
              - Broiliellus texensis
              - Broiliellus brevis
              - Broiliellus olsoni
            - Eucacopinae
              - Brevidorsum
              - - Admiral taxon (Scapanops)
                - Rio Arriba taxon (Conjunctio)
                - - Cacops morrisi
                  - Cacops aspidephorus
                  - - Kamacops
                    - Zygosaurus

== Gallery ==
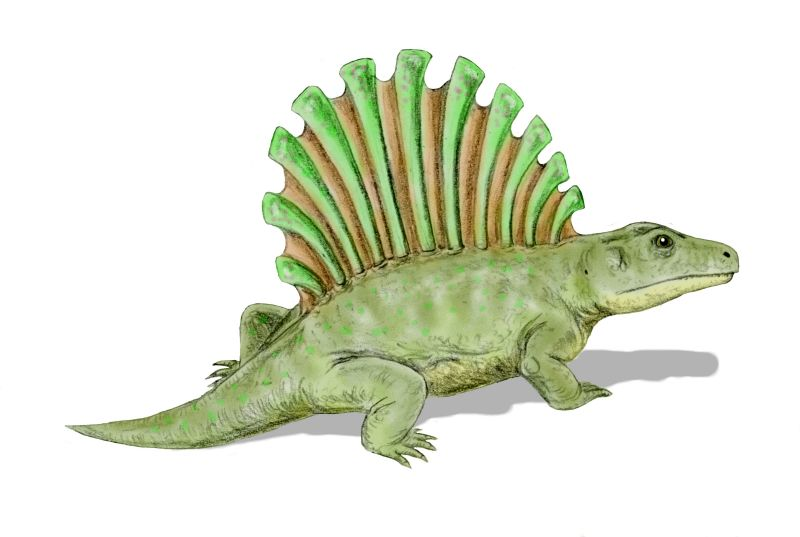
Platyhystrix rugosus, a platyhystricine of the very late Carboniferous to early Permian of North America

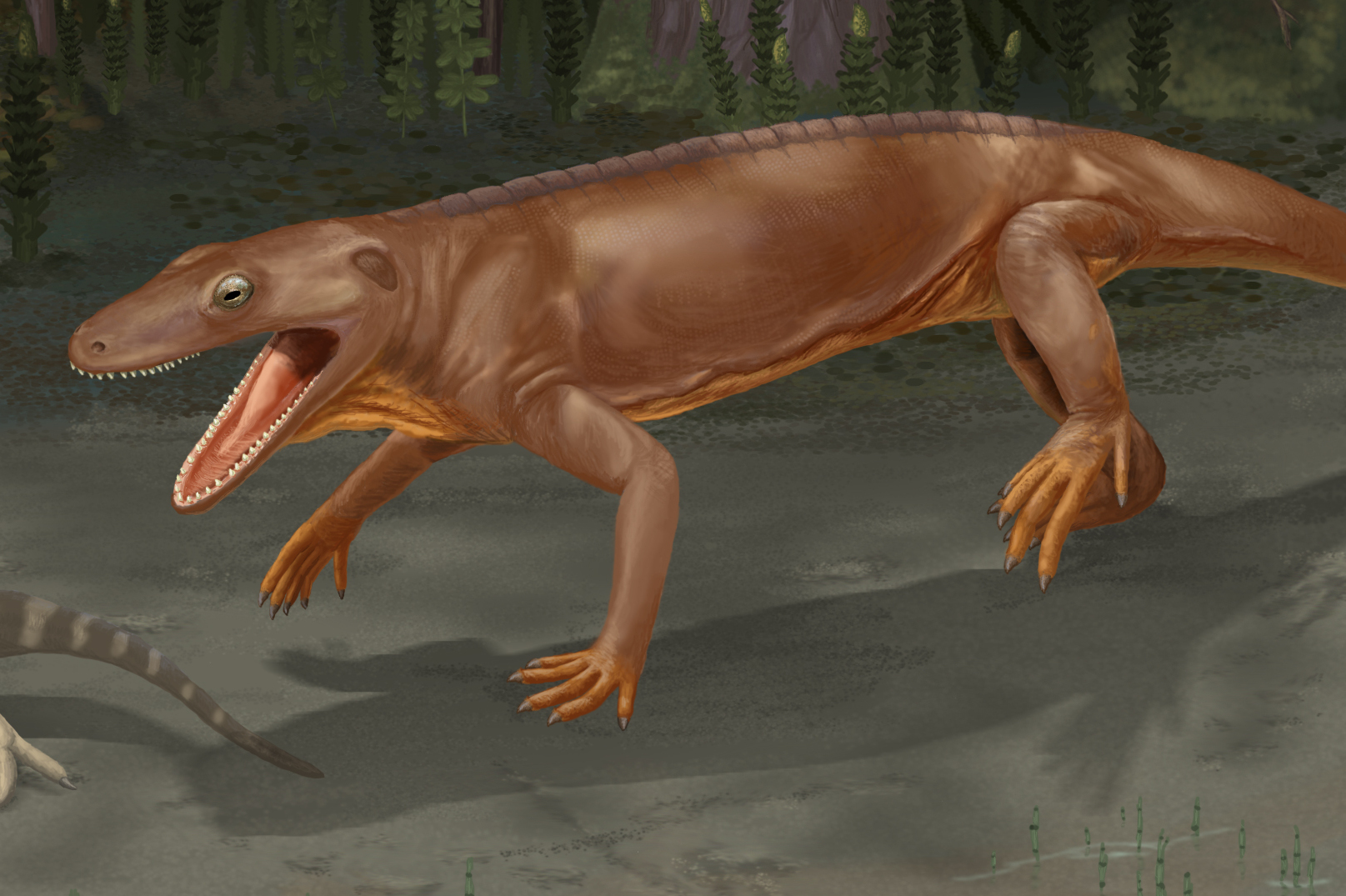
Nooxobeia gracilis, an unusually long-legged dissorophid of the early Permian of Oklahoma

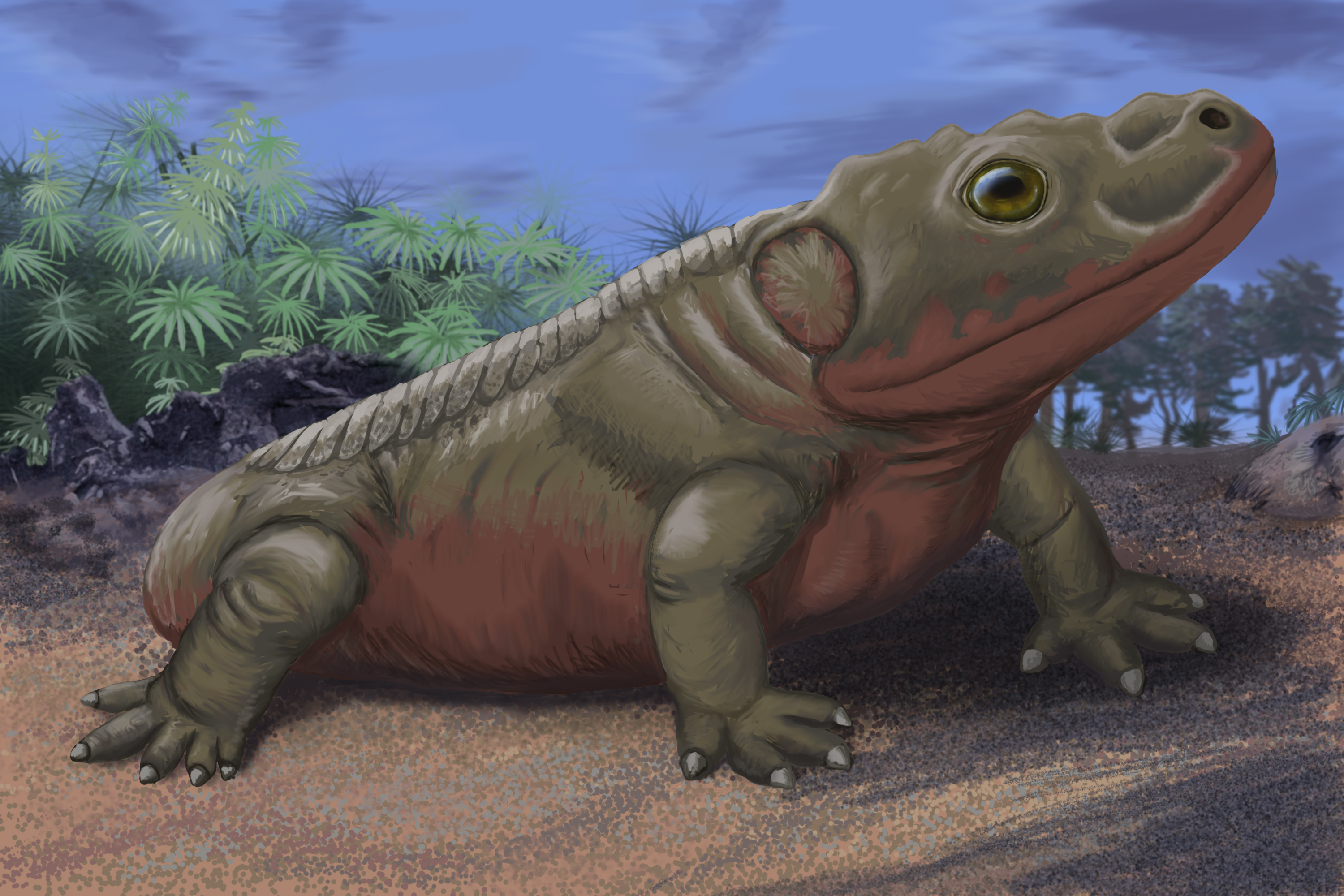
Broiliellus olsoni, a dissorophine of the early Permian of Texas

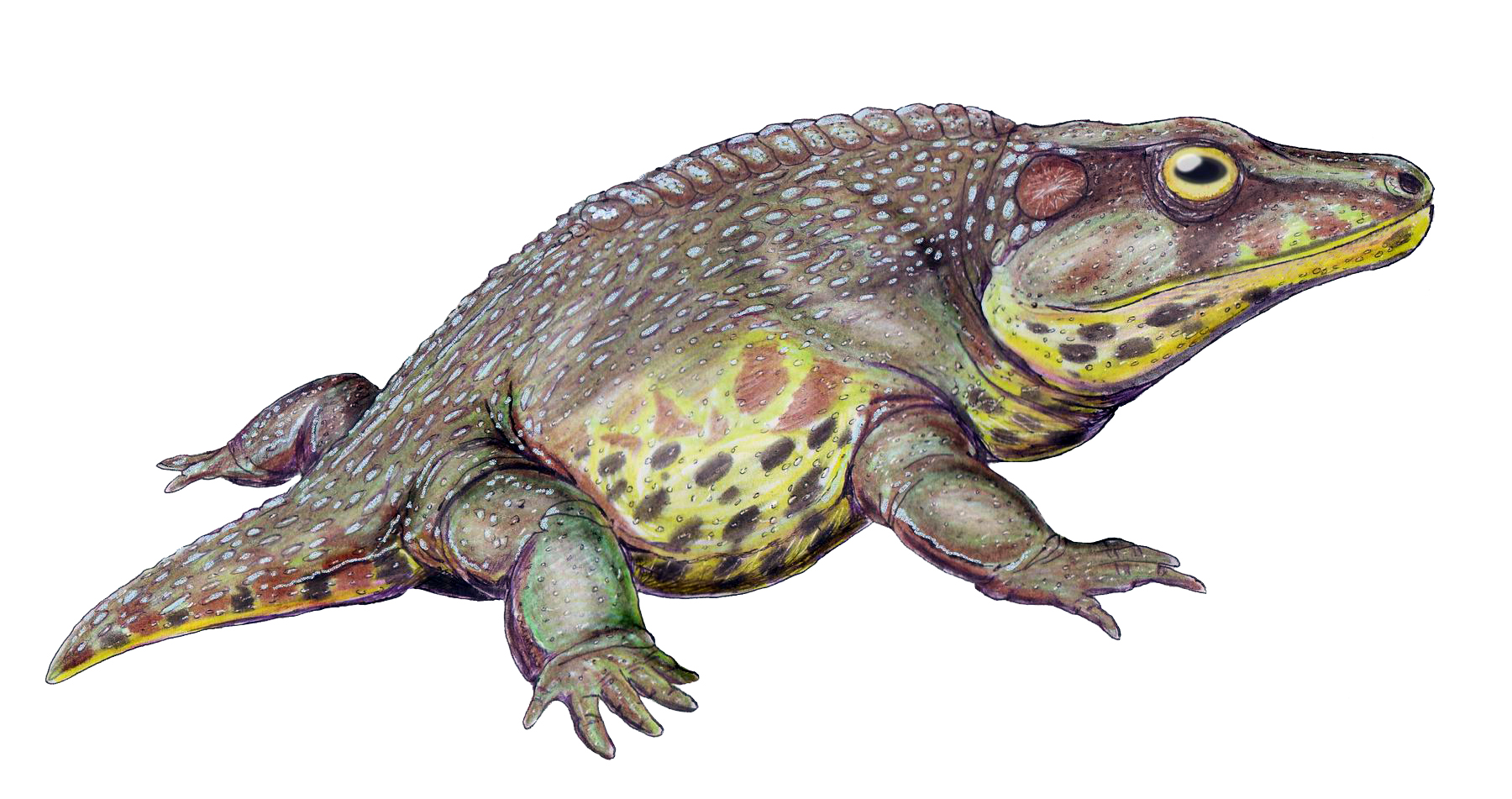
Cacops aspidephorus, a eucacopine of the early Permian of Texas

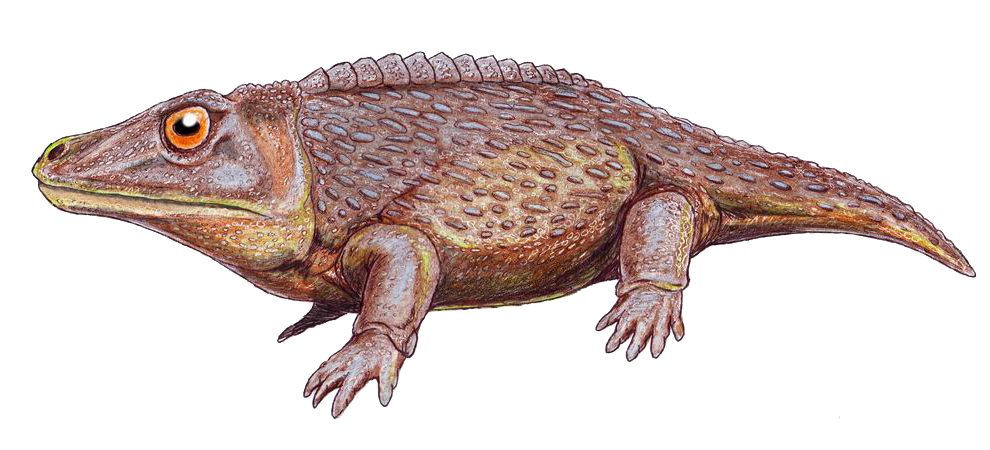
Zygosaurus lucius, a eucacopine of the middle Permian of Russia

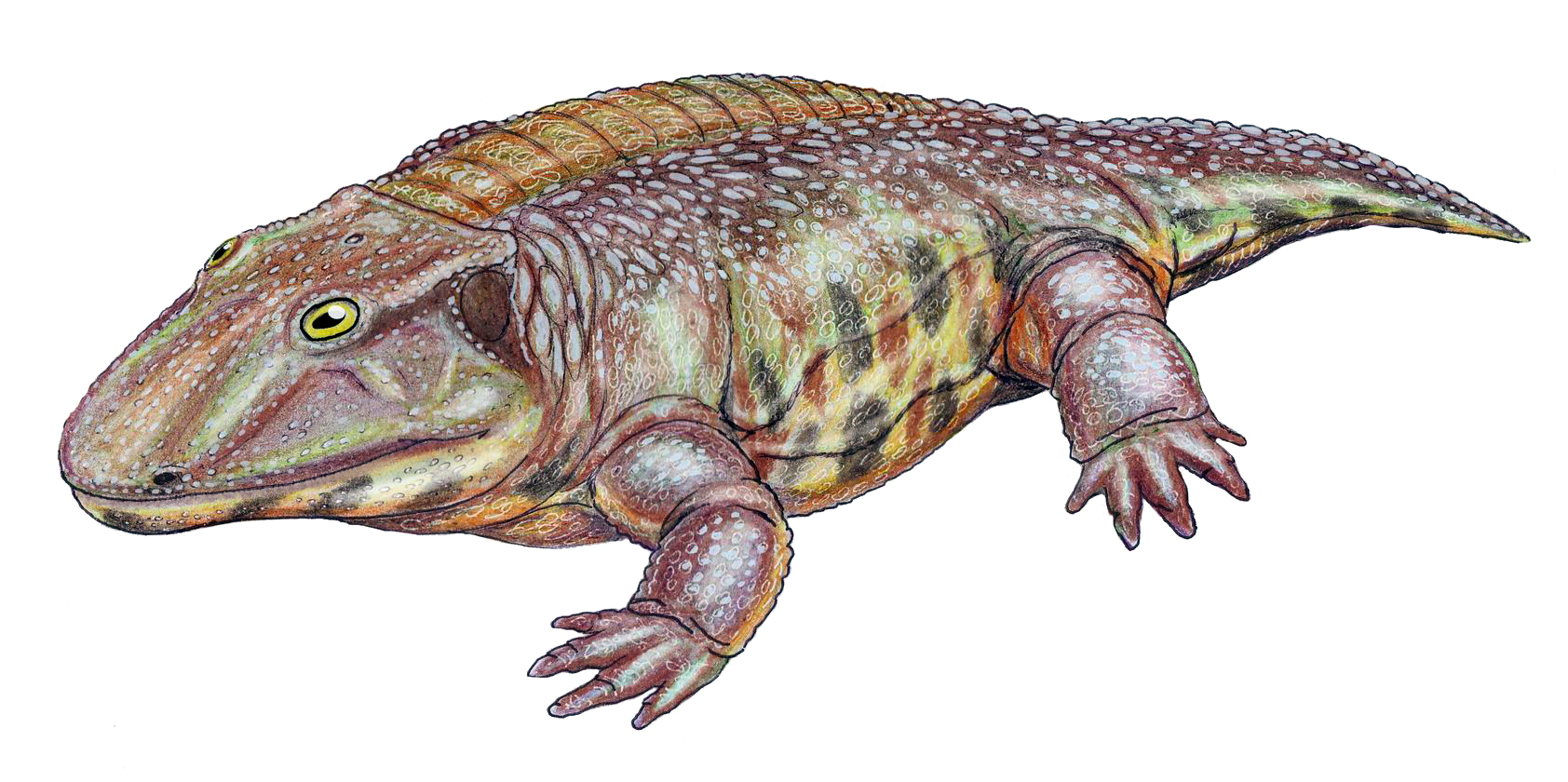
Kamacops acervalis, a eucacopine of the middle Permian of Russia

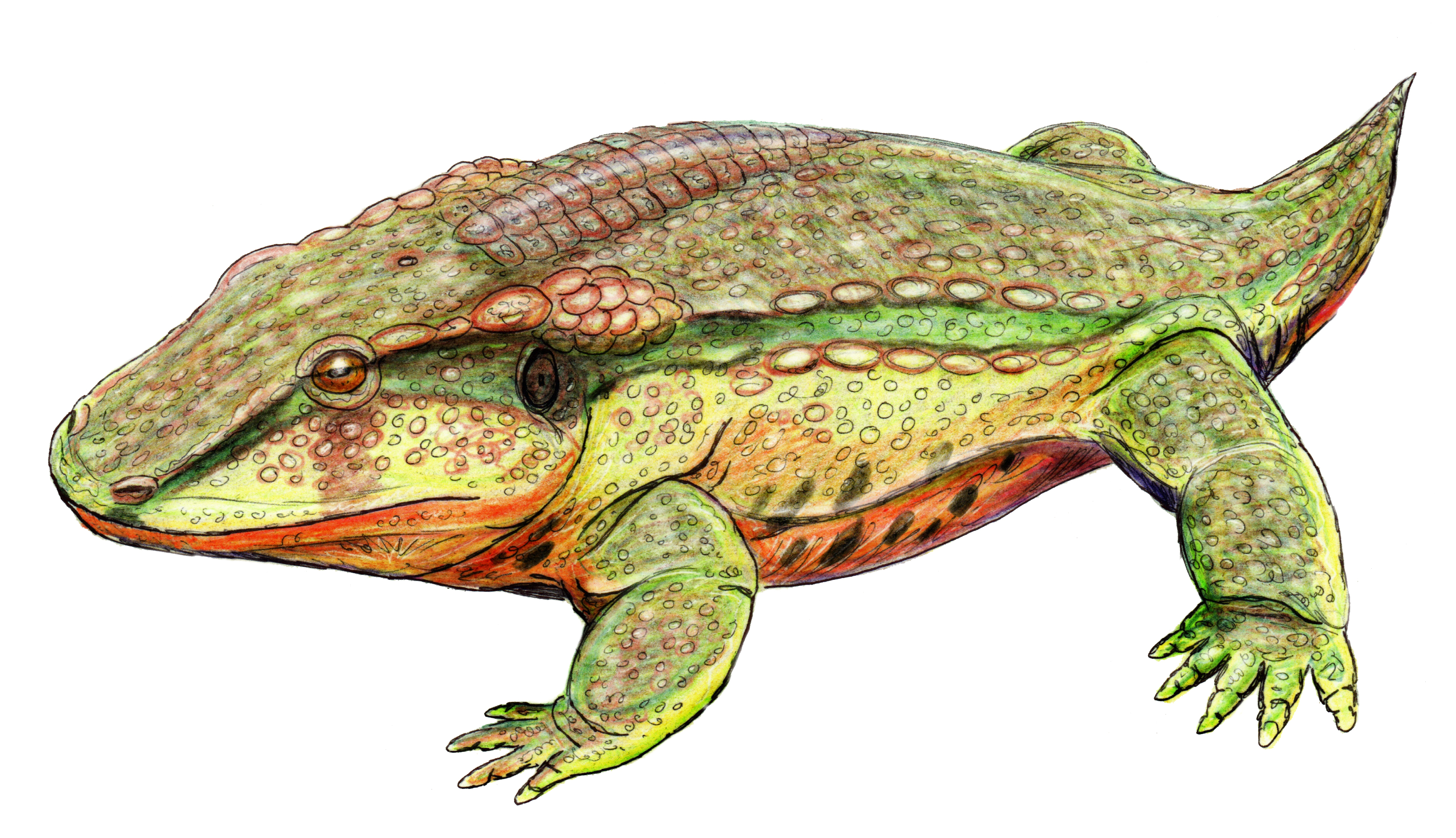
Anakamacops petrolicus, a eucacopine of the middle Permian of China
