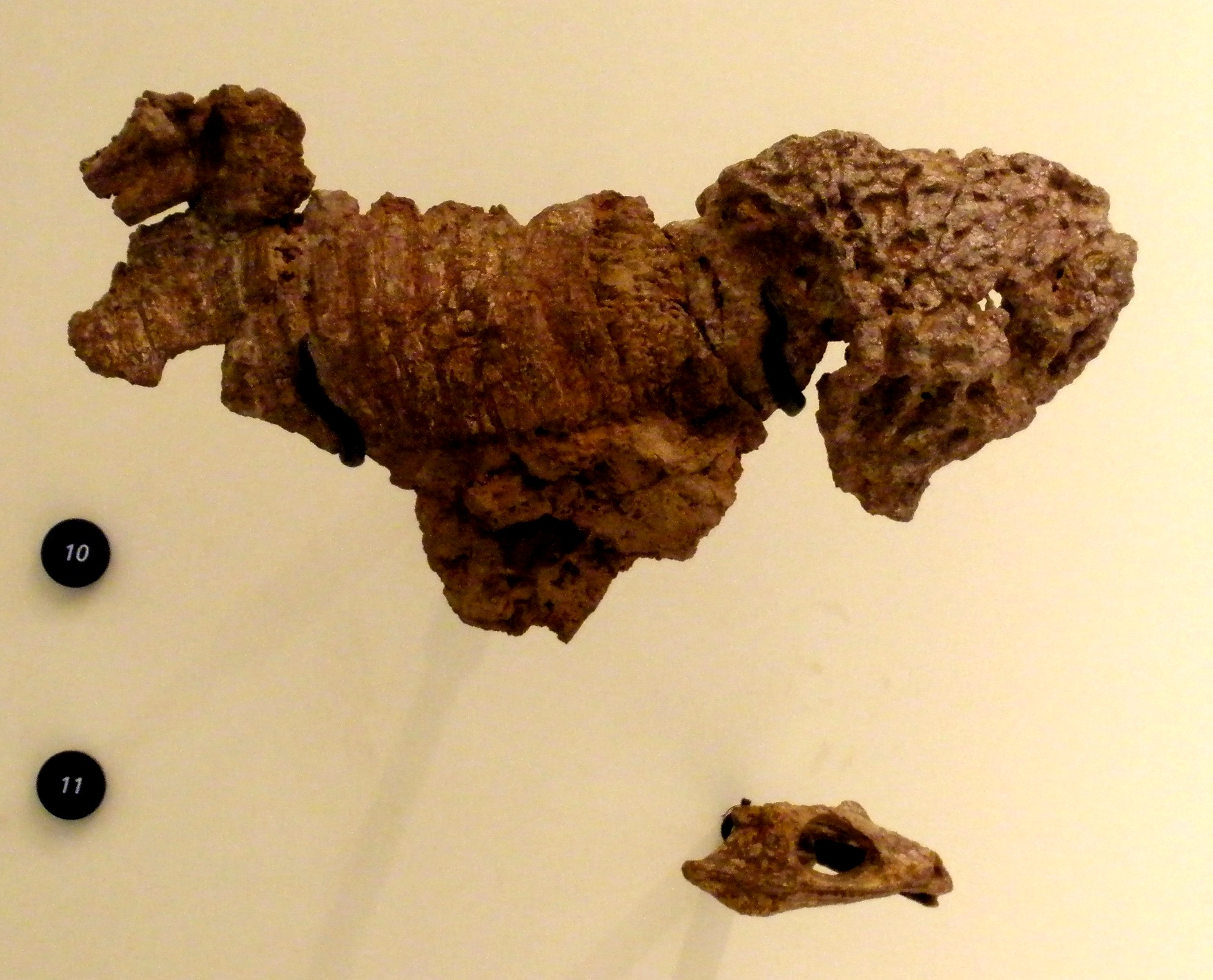
- Skeleton of Dissorophus multicinctus

Scientific classification
- Kingdom: Animalia
- Phylum: Chordata
- Clade: Tetrapoda
- Order: †Temnospondyli
- Family: †Dissorophidae
- Subfamily: †Dissorophinae; Boulenger, 1902

Subgroups
- See text.

= Dissorophinae =

Dissorophinae Temporal range: Early Permian

Extinct subfamily of amphibians

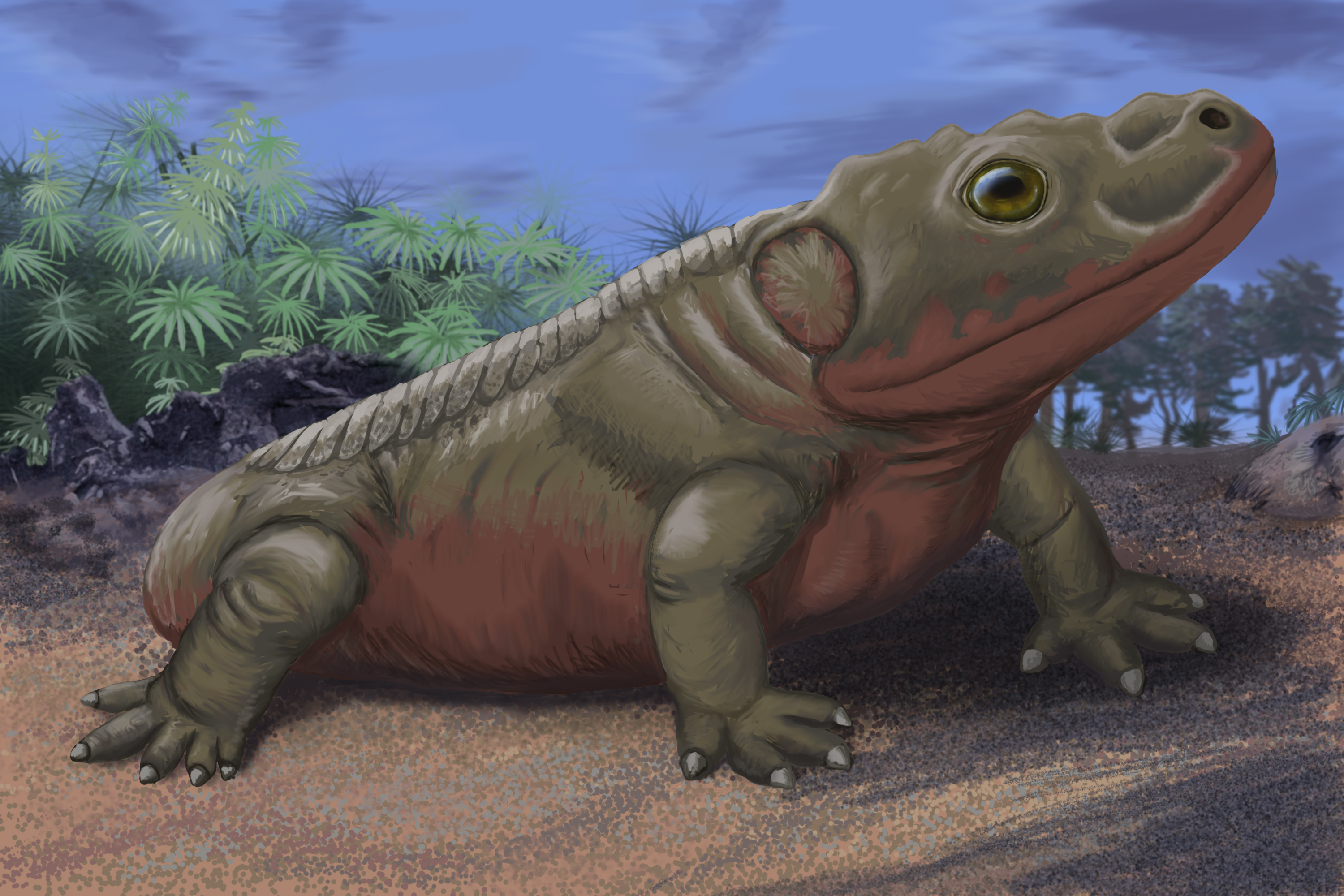
Restoration of Broiliellus olsoni

Dissorophinae is a subfamily of dissorophid temnospondyls that includes Dissorophus and Broiliellus.

== Phylogeny ==
Below is the cladogram from Schoch (2012):

- Dissorophoidea
  - Micromelerpetontidae
    - Micromelerpeton
  - - Amphibamidae
      - Platyrhinops
      - Doleserpeton
    - Olsoniformes
      - Trematopidae
        - Ecolsonia
        - Fedexia
        - - Tambachia
          - Anconastes
          - - Phonerpeton
            - Acheloma
      - Dissorophidae
        - Platyhystrix
        - Aspidosaurus
        - - Conjunctio
          - Dissorophinae
            - Dissorophus
            - Broiliellus texensis
            - Broiliellus brevis
            - Broiliellus olsoni
          - Cacopinae
            - Brevidorsum
            - - Admiral taxon
              - Rio Arriba taxon
              - - Cacops morrisi
                - Cacops aspidephorus
                - - Kamacops
                  - Zygosaurus
