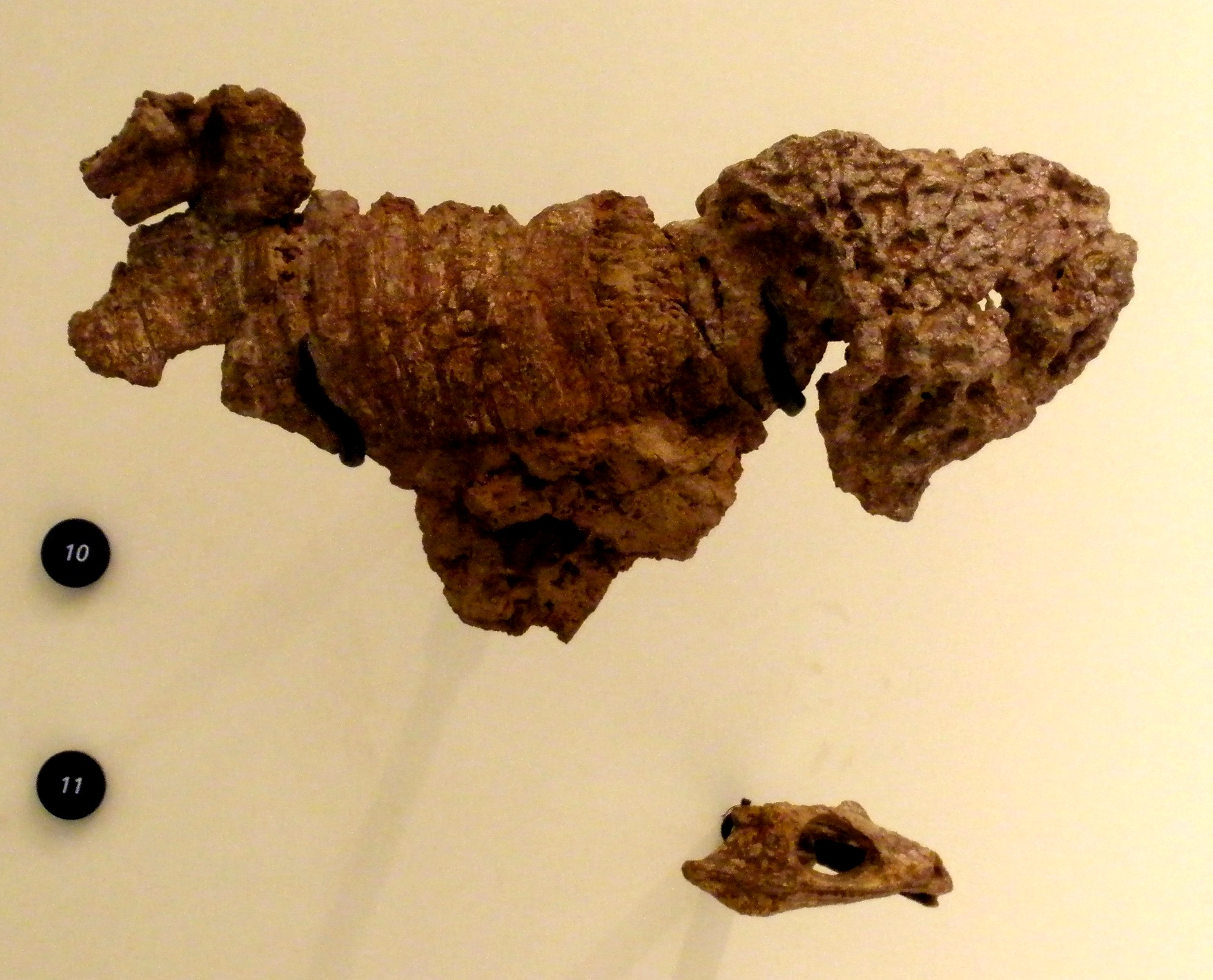
- Dissorophus multicinctus skeleton

Scientific classification
- Kingdom: Animalia
- Phylum: Chordata
- Clade: Tetrapoda
- Order: †Temnospondyli
- Family: †Dissorophidae
- Subfamily: †Dissorophinae
- Genus: †Dissorophus; Cope, 1895

Type species
- †Dissorophus multicinctus Cope, 1895

= Dissorophus =

Dissorophus Temporal range: Kungurian, 280–273 Ma

Extinct genus of amphibians

Dissorophus (DI-soh-ROH-fus) (meaning "double roof" for two layers of armor) is an extinct genus of temnospondyl amphibian that lived during the Early Permian Period about 273 million years ago. Its fossils have been found in Texas and in Oklahoma in North America. Its heavy armor and robust build indicate Dissorophus was active on land, similar to other members of the clade Dissorophidae that are known from the Late Carboniferous to the Early Permian periods. Dissorophus is distinguished by its small body size, disproportionately large head and short trunk.

The American paleontologist Edward Drinker Cope first briefly described Dissorophus in 1895, likely deriving the genus name from Ancient Greek δισσός/dissos "double" and ὀροφή/orophe "roof" to refer to the double layer of armor formed by horizontal "spinous branches" at the top of the neural spines of the vertebrae that "touch each other, forming a carapace" with overlying rows of bony osteoderms that form an armored "dermal layer of transverse bands which correspond to the skeletal carapace beneath," a feature expressed as well in the type species name multicinctus, meaning "many-banded" in Latin. Cope referred to the animal as "a veritable batrachian [amphibian] armadillo."

DeMar mentions Boulenger's interpretation of Dissorophus as "remarkable for an extraordinary exo- and endo-skeletal carapace", reflected in the name Dissorophus multicinctus for its double layered armor.

== History ==
Additional specimens of Dissorophus were later collected by the Museum of Comparative Zoology at Harvard College and the University of Chicago, described by the paleontologists Williston, Case and Romer. Williston (1914) divided the Dissorophidae into two subfamilies: Aspodosaurinae and Dissorophinae. He distinguished the Aspodosaurinae as having an open otic notch and single layered armor (one armor segment per vertebral segment), and Dissorophinae as having a closed otic notch and double layered armor (two armor segments per vertebral segment).

== Classification ==
Below is a cladogram from Schoch (2010). Schoch developed his cladogram based on an analysis of anatomical features of dissorophids. He found that Dissorophus, Broiliellus texensis, Broiliellus brevis and Broiliellus olson all share a pointed snout as a common feature.

- Dissorophoidea
  - Micromelerpetontidae
    - Micromelerpeton
  - - Amphibamidae
      - Platyrhinops
      - Doleserpeton
    - Olsoniformes
      - Trematopidae
        - Ecolsonia
        - Fedexia
        - - Tambachia
          - Anconastes
          - - Phonerpeton
            - Acheloma
      - Dissorophidae
        - Platyhystrix
        - - Aspidosaurus
          - - Conjunctio
            - Dissorophinae
              - Dissorophus
              - Broiliellus texensis
              - Broiliellus brevis
              - Broiliellus olsoni
            - Cacopinae
              - Brevidorsum
              - - Admiral taxon
                - Rio Arriba taxon
                - - Cacops morrisi
                  - Cacops aspidephorus
                  - - Kamacops
                    - Zygosaurus

== Description and Paleobiology ==
=== Skull ===
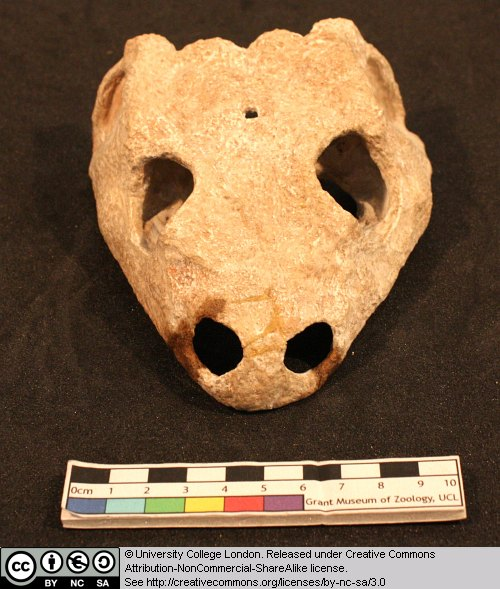
Dissorophus skull in anterior view showing frontal depressions

Schoch and Sues describe the skull of Dissorophus multicinctus as "short and broad posteriorly". DeMar and Williston mention that the skull has two equal sides and it is flat posterior to the orbit, but curved and has depressions from anterior to margins. In addition, the skull surface shows deep circular pits or depressions situated on posterior portions of the frontals and bound by narrow ridges between them and thus difficult to distinguish sutures.

According to DeMar, the skull depth increases posteriorly and decreases anteriorly when in lateral view. He points out another prominent feature of Dissorophus which is an enlarged otic notch. Measuring up to 3.5 cm in length, the otic notch of Dissorophus is relatively deeper than some members of the family Dissorophidae who possess shallow otic notches. The presence of an otic notch firmly assures that dissorophides are indeed unified with the amphibian family because this feature present in all amphibians and lost in later amniotes. DeMar also adds that the depth of the otic notch relates to the length of the skull. In this case, short skulls would have shallow otic notches and longer skulls would possess deeper otic notches.

Carroll (1964) makes a similar observation as DeMar in Broiliellus brevus that has a short skull and therefore a shallow otic notch, as expected. On the other hand, Bolt makes a crucial comment, that the specimens used to describe these anatomical features by both DeMar and Carroll are based on that assumption that they are in "adult configurations". DeMar mentions that the external nares is enlarged and measures up to 1 cm long in larger specimens.

On this note, Williston adds that the external naris are elongated along the skull margins, resulting to an oval shaped outline and oriented laterally and anteriorly.

The orbits of Dissorophus are relatively large, circular, and oriented dorsally than laterally. As DeMar describes, the orbits are large enough to intersect with the frontals, palatines, post orbitals, lacrimals, and jugals.

DeMar also makes points out a crucial feature that suggest why Dissorophus and Broileillus are closely related to one another than any other species. This feature at the region where maxillary, quadratojugal and jugal meet. In this case, he illustrates that the jugal overlaps the quadratojugal and maxillary, thus extending to the tooth rows. This feature was also observed by Carroll (1964) on Broiliellus brevis, Conjuctio and Dissorophus angustus. Thus, this feature gives another explanation to the relationship between Dissorophus and Conjunctio, keeping in mind that Dissorophus and Broiliellus are more closely related to each other because they both have a pointed snout while Conjunctio does not.

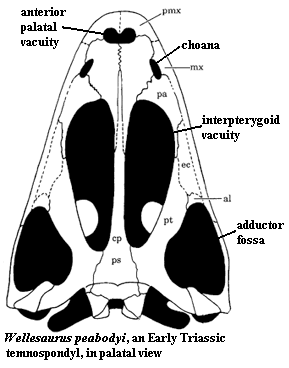
Ventral view of a Temnospondyl Skull showing Interpterigoid Vicuity

Another distinct feature that Dissorophus has is that the maxillary teeth extend further back ventral to the squamosal. DeMar explains this extension of teeth further back correlates with the jugal overlap on the maxillary and quadratojugal. In addition, DeMar clarifies that the contact between vomer and pterygoid is lost resulting to palatine contributing to an enlarged interpterygoid.

=== Lower Jaw ===
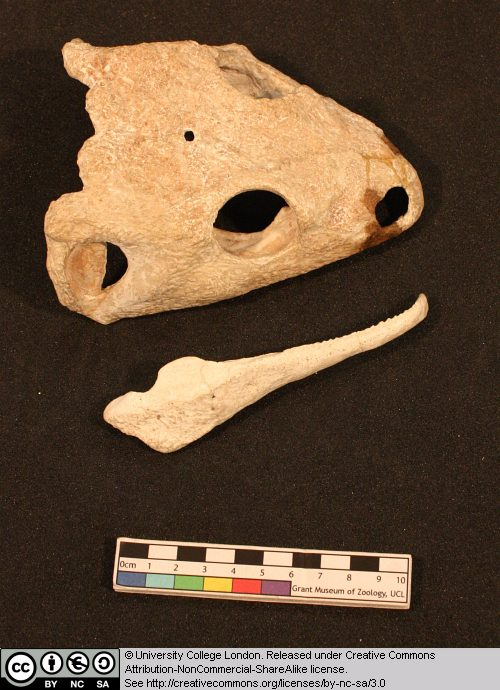
Dissorophus multicinctus skull in Lateral view including dentary

Williston's anatomical analysis on Dissorophus reveal that there are about thirty five teeth on the dentary. Additionally, DeMar's mentions that the entire lower jaw is covered by dermal pitting except for the region of coronoid process. He also mentions that the coronoid process extends anteriorly and serves as an attachment point for muscles and thus the most probable diet inferred would be a carnivore likely to prey on smaller animals such as insects and smaller animals. DeMar also comments on a distinctive feature that is only present in Dissorophus multicinctus and not any other dissorophids. He explains the presence of a ventral flange that interrupts the continuity of the lower jaw. Connecting to the ventral flange is a pitted surface of angular that "continues on the ventral edge and projects medially forming a small shelf." He concludes that this arrangement of lower jaw is not found in any other dissopophid, however, the angular projection ventral to the ventral flange is also developed in Briolielus.

=== Limbs ===
Williston explains that the humerus and femur of Dissorophus are solidly built and stouter. The humerus has "deep lateral curvatures and wide supracondicular ridges" while the femur is a lot stronger built compared to the humerus. He also mentions that the articular surface of Dissorophus femur is "flattened with sharp rims on the antero-posterior convexity". He adds that both femur and humerus are both "expanded on the inner and outer side and narrow in the middle".

=== Carapace and Vertebrae ===
The carapace is another distinctive feature present in Dissorophus. Williston describes this feature as a heavy bony covering that is not necessarily broad, but long and heavy. The dorsal section is deeply pitted and the ventral section is rather smooth. In addition, Dilkes's findings show that the osteoderm is composed of an internal section and external section that are "expanded laterally". His distinction between an internal and external section is such that the internal section is associated with a flange. The flanges are deeply notched and the edges of these notches serve as attachment points to the neural spine, this explains his hardships in trying to decipher regions of the neural spine. On the other hand, the external series are positioned anterior to the internal series. He also adds that both series are likely fused together by interosteodermal ligaments. This osteoderm feature that Dilkes makes directly correlates to Bolt's interpretations that Dissorophus has a double layered osteoderm comprising both the internal series and external series.

In terms of locomotion, Dilkes mentions that compared to Cacops, Dissorphus likely had a more flexible vertebral column in terms of lateral flexion and axial rotation. Limitation to locomotion is solely based on anatomy of the osteoderms. As Dilkes explains, coupling between lateral flexion and axial rotation throughout the vertebrae, translates to limited locomotion. In the case of Cacops, Dilkes's interpretation on the 20-degree angle of inclination of the zygapophyses indicate that coupling between lateral flexion and axial rotation is highly limited. In addition, there is extensive overlap between internal series and external series which contributes to a limitation of lateral flexion. In the case of Dissorophus, Dilkes gives more detail that there is larger angle of inclinations of zygapophyses indicating that there is greater coupling between the axial rotation and lateral flexion despite insertion of the flanges in the neural spine.

In conclusion, both DeMar and Dilkes clarify that the osteoderm growth covers the first sections of the anterior vertebral column and grows posteriorly with fusion of the next posterior vertebral sections. This means that reduction of flexibility starts anteriorly and proceeds posteriorly, thus it is likely that "as juveniles both Cacops and Dissorophus had greater vertebral flexibility" as mentioned by Dilkes.

== Paleoenvironment ==
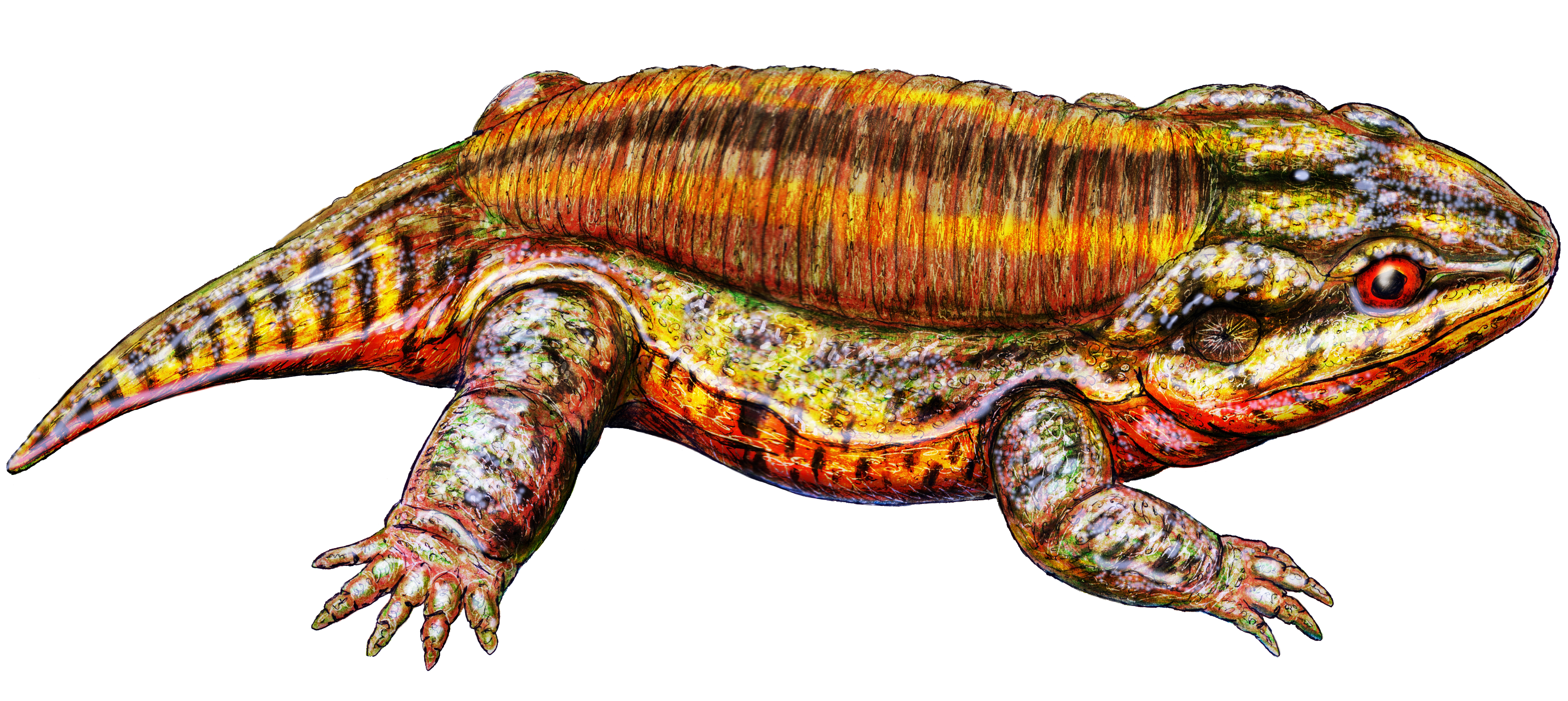
Life restoration

Modern amphibians are semi-aquatic. According to DeMar, Dissorophus multicinctus had made a full transition on terrestrial land, indicated by the presence of a dermal armor that made it less dependent on water and better adapted to active life on land.

His hypotheses on terrestriality include:

- "Terrestrial animals live in a medium of low density (air) thus must have stronger support in vertebral column and limbs for static stress. So it is expected that it would have features that diminish static stress such as a dorsal armor."
- "Terrestrial animals move actively on land so it would have features that assist with the activity."
- "Terrestrial animals are subject to drying so it would possess features that reduce drying."

Some functions of the dorsal armor suggested by DeMar include;

- "Protection against predators."
- "Limit mobility of the vertebral column."
- "Reduce surface subject to drying."

DeMar's suggestions on terrestriality and functions of dermal armor directly correlates to the Geological location at which Dissorphus multicinctus fossils are found. According to both Williston, Schoch and information from the Paleobiology database , Dissorophus fossils are found in the Clear Fork Division of the Texas Red-beds of Arroyo formation.

== Sources ==
- Bolt, J. R. (1974). "Armor of dissorophids (Amphibia: Labyrinthodontia): An examination of its taxonomic use and report of a new occurrence". Journal of Paleontology. 48 (1): 135–142. JSTOR 1303113.
- Carroll, R. L. (1964). "Early evolution of the dissorophid amphibians". Bulletin of the Museum of Comparative Zoology. 131: 202–210.
- DeMar, R. E. (1966). "The phylogenetic and functional implications of the armor of the Dissorophidae". Fieldiana Geology. 16: 55–88.
- DeMar, R. E. (1968). "The Permian labyrinthodont amphibian Dissorophus multicinctus, and adaptations and phylogeny of the family Dissorophidae". Journal of Paleontology. 42 (5): 1210–1242. JSTOR 1302258.
- Dilkes, D. W. (2009). "Comparison and biomechanical interpretations of the vertebrae and osteoderms of Cacops aspidephorus and Dissorophus multicinctus (Temnospondyli, Dissorophidae)". Journal of Vertebrate Paleontology. 29 (4): 1013–1021. Bibcode:2009JVPal..29.1013D. doi:10.1671/039.029.0410. S2CID 83473463.
- May, W.; Huttenlocker, A. K.; Pardo, J. D.; Benca, J.; Small, B. J. (2011). "New Upper Pennsylvanian armored dissorophid records (Temnospondyli, Dissorophoidea) from U.S. midcontinent and the stratigraphic distributions of dissorophids". Journal of Vertebrate Paleontology. 31 (4): 907–912. Bibcode:2011JVPal..31..907M. doi:10.1080/02724634.2011.582532. S2CID 129859785.
- Schoch, R. R. (2010). "Heterochrony: the interplay between development and ecology exemplified by a Paleozoic amphibian clade". Paleobiology. 36 (2): 318–334. doi:10.1666/09011.1. S2CID 86313814.
- Schoch, R. R. (2012). "Character distribution and phylogeny of the dissorophid temnospondyls". Fossil Record. 15 (2): 121–137. doi:10.1002/mmng.201200010.
- Schoch, R. R.; Sues, H. D. (2013). "A new dissorophid temnospondyl from the Lower Permian of north-central Texas". Comptes Rendus Palevol. 12 (7): 437–445. Bibcode:2013CRPal..12..437S. doi:10.1016/j.crpv.2013.04.002.
- Williston, S. W. (1910). "Dissorophus Cope". Journal of Geology. 18 (6). University of Chicago Press: 526–536. Bibcode:1910JG.....18..526W. doi:10.1086/621768. JSTOR 30078114. S2CID 224836685.
