= Iratusaurus =

Iratusaurus Temporal range: Middle Permian

Scientific classification
- Kingdom: Animalia
- Phylum: Chordata
- Clade: Tetrapoda
- Order: †Temnospondyli
- Family: †Dissorophidae
- Genus: †Iratusaurus; Gubin, 1980

Extinct genus of amphibians

Iratusaurus is an extinct genus of dissorophoid temnospondyl within the family Dissorophidae. It was described by Gubin (1980) on the basis of a fragmentary posterior skull. It is estimated to have been comparably large to Kamacops, another Russian dissorophid, but little more can be said about it, and it is rarely mentioned in comparative descriptions and has never been tested in a phylogenetic analysis. Distinguishing features include a large, triangular otic notch and a median crest on the postparietals.

== See also ==
- List of prehistoric amphibians
