= Ferdinand Broili =

German paleontologist

Ferdinand Broili (11 April 1874 in Mühlbach – 30 April 1946 in Mühlbach) was a German paleontologist. He took a special interest in the Permian amphibians and reptiles and described the fossil tetrapod Seymouria in 1904. He revised Zittel's Grundzüge der Paleontologie.

Broili was born the son of J. B. Broili, squire, in Mühlbach Castle in Lower Franconia. He studied natural sciences at the University of Würzburg, and the Ludwig-Maximilians-Universität München, where his influences were Karl von Zittel and August Rothpletz. In 1899, he received his doctorate from the Ludwig-Maximilians-Universität München with a dissertation on Eryops megacephalus, titled Ein Beitrag zur Kenntnis von Eryops megacephalus. In 1903, he obtained his habilitation, and in 1908 became an associate professor at the university. In 1919, he was appointed director of the Staatssammlung fur Palaontologie und historische Geologie ("State Collection for Paleontology and Historical Geology") in Munich.

In 1901, he traveled to the Texas Red Beds, where with Charles Hazelius Sternberg, he collected and studied fossil vertebrates of the Permian period. In 1903, his habilitation was on the fauna of the pachycardia tuff. Later on in his career, he carried out significant investigations of pterosaur fossils from the Solnhofen limestone of Bavaria. In the 1930s, with Joachim Schröder, he published a 28 volume series on vertebrates of the Karoo Formation of South Africa (Beobachtungen an Wirbeltieren der Karroo Formation; 1934–37). The Permian amphibian genus Broiliellus commemorates his name. He retired in 1939. His collections were destroyed in the bombing of Munich, and he moved back to his paternal estate.

== Selected works ==
- Permische stegocephalen und reptilien aus Texas, 1904 – Permian stegocephalians and reptiles of Texas.
- Grundzüge der Paläontologie (by Karl von Zittel, new edition by Broili, 1910–11).
- Zur Osteologie des Schädels von Placodus, 1912 – The osteology of the skull of Placodus.
- Die permischen Brachiopoden von Timor, 1916 – The Permian brachiopods of Timor.
- Permische brachiopoden von Rotti, 1922 – The Permian brachiopods of Rote Island.
- Zur geologie des Vogelkop, 1924 – The geology of Vogelkop.
- Ein neuer Fund von Pleurosaurus aus dem Malm Frankens, 1926 – A new discovery of Pleurosaurus from the Late Jurassic in Franconia.
- Mixosauridae von Timor, 1931 – Mixosauridae of Timor.
- Zur Osteologie des Kopfes von Cynognathus, 1934 – The osteology of the skull of Cynognathus.
