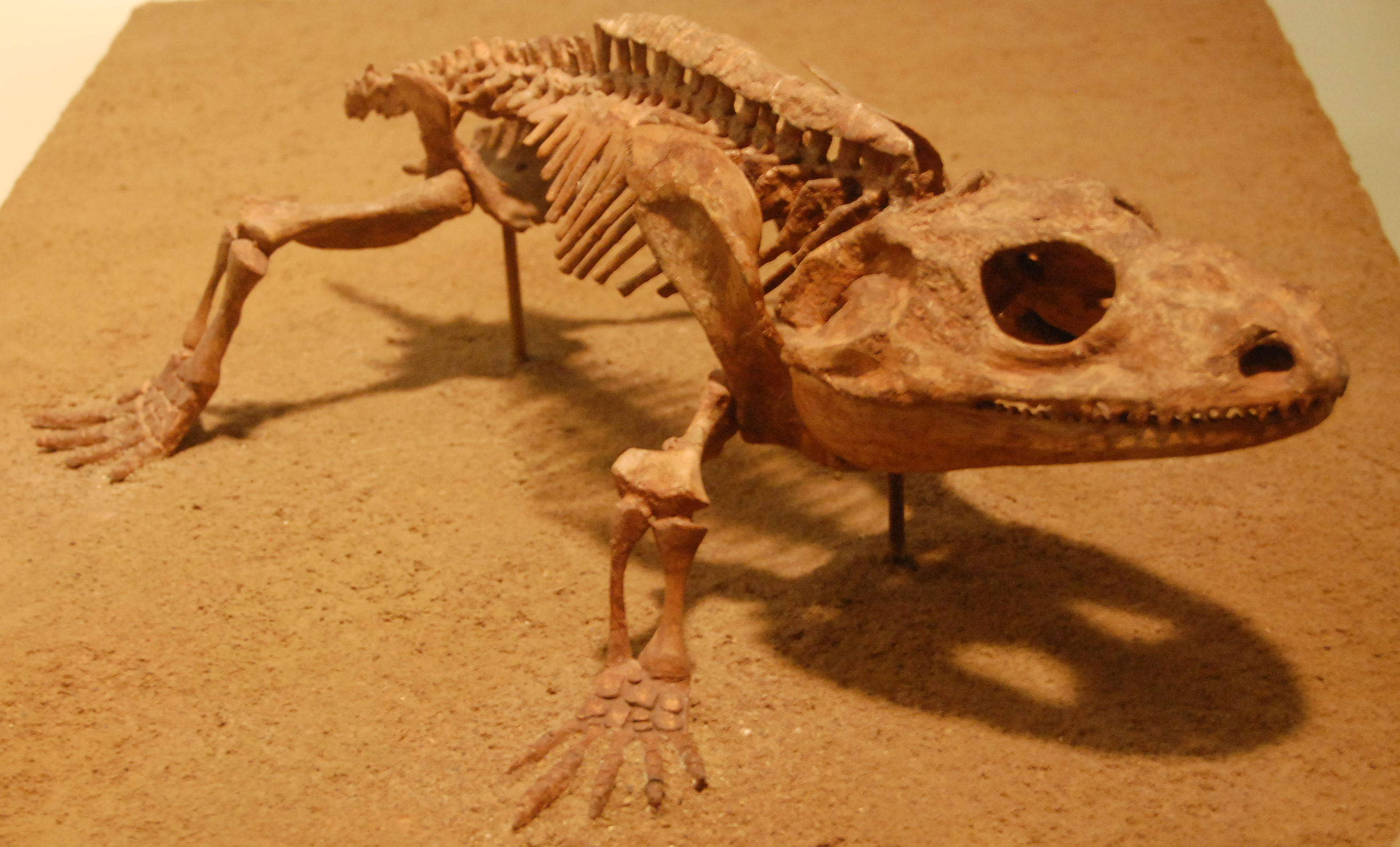
- Skeleton of Cacops in the Field Museum

Scientific classification
- Domain: Eukaryota
- Kingdom: Animalia
- Phylum: Chordata
- Order: †Temnospondyli
- Family: †Dissorophidae
- Clade: †Eucacopinae; Schoch and Sues, 2013

Synonyms
- Brevidorsinae; Kamacopinae; Zygosaurinae

= Eucacopinae =

Eucacopinae Temporal range: Late Carboniferous - Early Permian

Extinct clade of amphibians

Eucacopinae is an extinct clade (evolutionary grouping) of dissorophid temnospondyls. Eucacopines differ from the other main group of dissorophids, the Dissorophinae, in having more lightly built skeletons and more knobby skulls. The subfamily was originally named Cacopinae, but since the name was already established for a group of living microhylid frogs in 1931, the name was changed to Eucacopinae in 2013. Eucacopinae is a stem-based taxon defined as the most inclusive clade containing the species Cacops apsidephorus but not Dissorophus multicinctus, which belongs to Dissorophinae. According to the most recent phylogenetic analyses of Dissorophidae, Eucacopinae includes the basal ("primitive") species Conjunctio multidens and Scapanops neglecta from the southwestern United States and a more derived ("advanced") group including several species of Cacops (also from the southwestern United States) and the Russian genera Kamacops and Zygosaurus. Derived eucacopines have two rows of bony plates called osteoderms running down their backs, while the more basal eucacopines have only a single row. Dissorophines also have a double row of osteoderms but probably evolved them independently because the most recent common ancestor of the two groups had a single row of osteoderms.
