= Brevidorsum =

Brevidorsum Temporal range: Early Permian

Scientific classification
- Kingdom: Animalia
- Phylum: Chordata
- Clade: Tetrapoda
- Order: †Temnospondyli
- Family: †Dissorophidae
- Clade: †Eucacopinae
- Genus: †Brevidorsum; Carroll, 1964

Extinct genus of amphibians

Brevidorsum is an extinct genus of dissorophoidean euskelian temnospondyl within the family Dissorophidae.

== See also ==
- Prehistoric amphibian
- List of prehistoric amphibians
