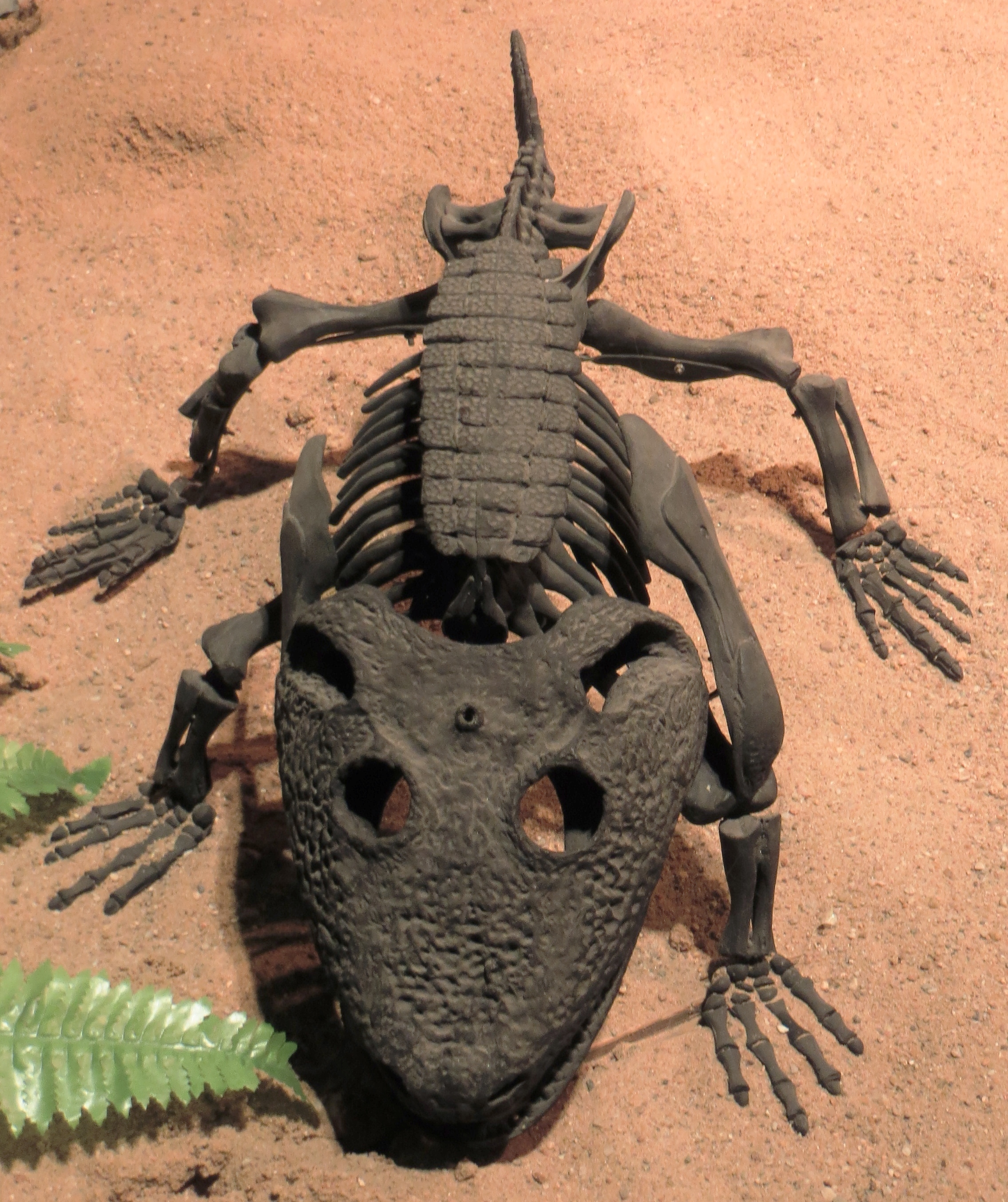
- Reconstructed skeleton

Scientific classification
- Domain: Eukaryota
- Kingdom: Animalia
- Phylum: Chordata
- Order: †Temnospondyli
- Family: †Dissorophidae
- Clade: †Eucacopinae
- Genus: †Kamacops; Gubin, 1980

= Kamacops =

Kamacops Temporal range: Middle Permian

Extinct genus of amphibians

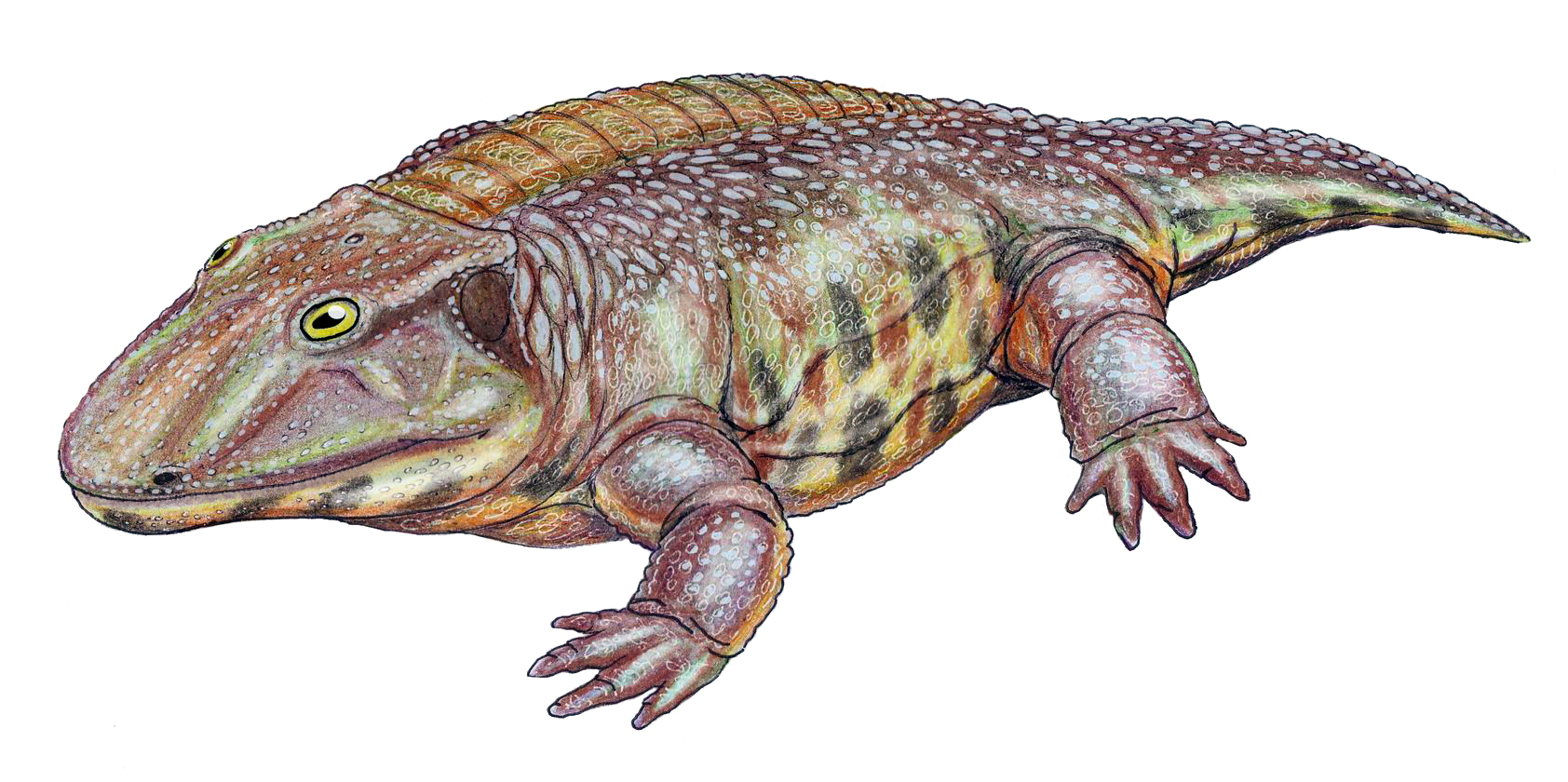
Restoration of Kamacops acervalis

Kamacops is a genus of dissorophid temnospondyls known from the Middle to Late Permian of Russia that was described by Yuri Gubin in 1980. It is known from a single species, Kamacops acervalis, material of which is currently reposited in the Paleontological Institute of the Russian Academy of Sciences. Kamacops is one of the youngest dissorophids, along with Iratusaurus and Zygosaurus from Russia and Anakamacops from China and was one of the largest known dissorophids, with an estimated skull length of 24–30 cm. It is typically recovered as being most closely related to Zygosaurus and to the North American Cacops. A detailed study of the braincase region was performed by Schoch (1999), one of the first to examine this region in dissorophids. This study revealed extensive co-ossification of the braincase.
