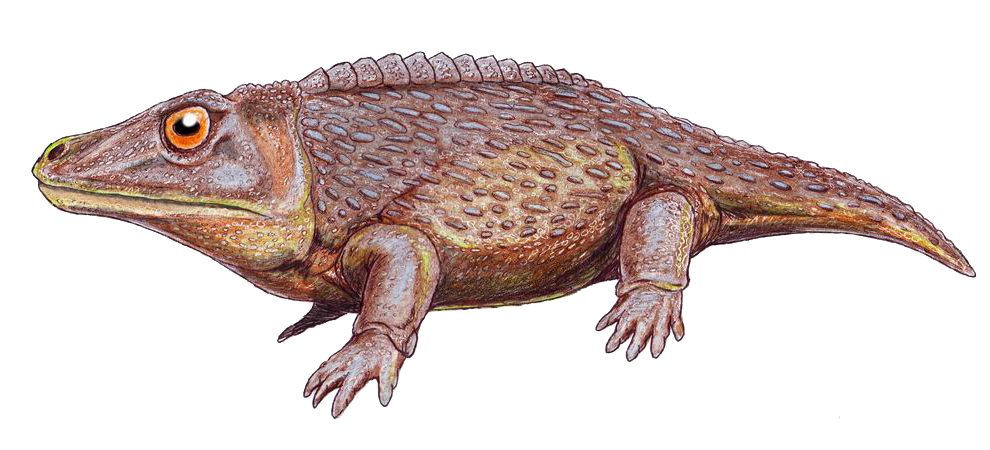
- Life restoration of Zygosaurus

Scientific classification
- Kingdom: Animalia
- Phylum: Chordata
- Clade: Tetrapoda
- Order: †Temnospondyli
- Family: †Dissorophidae
- Clade: †Eucacopinae
- Genus: †Zygosaurus; Eichwald, 1848

Type species
- †Zygosaurus lucius Eichwald, 1848

= Zygosaurus =

Zygosaurus Temporal range: Middle Permian

Extinct genus of amphibians

Zygosaurus is an extinct genus of dissorophid temnospondyl from the Middle Permian of Russia. It was described in 1848 by Eduard Eichwald, making it the first dissorophid to be described and the first temnospondyl documented from Russia. It is known from a single species, Zygosaurus lucius.

== History of study ==
The holotype and only known specimen of Z. lucius was collected from the Klyuchevsky Mine-1 (sometimes Kluchevskii) locality in Bashkortostan and described by Eichwald (1848). At some point, the holotype was lost, and only casts remain, one of which (PIN 1956/8) is now the lectotype.

A second specimen (SPbU No. 1/1329) was described by Efremov (1937) but only referred to Zygosaurus sp. This specimen was subsequently redescribed by Novozhilov (1940) and Gubin (1987), the latter of whom referred it to Kamacops sp. Eichwald had examined the specimen and also considered it to belong to Zygosaurus; the exact locality from which the specimen was collected has never been fully resolved, but lithological analysis of different candidate localities suggests they are from coeval but separate localities.

Efremov & Vyushkov (1955), and the English counterpart (Olson, 1957), reported several occurrences of Zygosaurus from different localities but without specific specimen numbers, figures, or description.

Schoch & Milner (2014) included a diagnosis in their revision of non-stereospondylomorph temnospondyls; they diagnosed Zygosaurus by (1) narrow skull table; (2) preorbital length twice as long as posterior skull length; (3) large pineal foramen; (4) orbits proportionately larger than in Kamacops; and (5) skull widest at the mid-length of the orbits.

Uliakhin (2025) redescribed the lectotype and referred specimen in the context of an ontogenetic analysis, noting that differences in the inferred ontogenetic transformation from that observed in Cacops might suggest that the two specimens are not conspecific, but he elected to maintain the classification for the time being.

== Anatomy ==
Due to the loss of the holotype and the poor preservation of both known specimens, little is known about this taxon beyond qualitative aspects of the skull (e.g., preorbital length twice as long as postorbital length; skull width greatest at mid-length of orbits). The skull of the holotype was estimated to be around 20 cm in length, already making it one of the largest dissorophids, being only slightly smaller than Kamacops, before Uliakhin's (2025) redescription of the referred specimen, which is estimated to around 36 cm in skull length. The holotype represented a natural mold of a nearly complete skull but without most of the surface details like ornamentation and sutures. The referred specimen represents a fragment from the middle of the skull, including the palate. What can be observed compares favorably with other dissorophids like Anakamacops, Cacops, and Kamacops in aspects such as the ornamentation and the closed otic notch.
