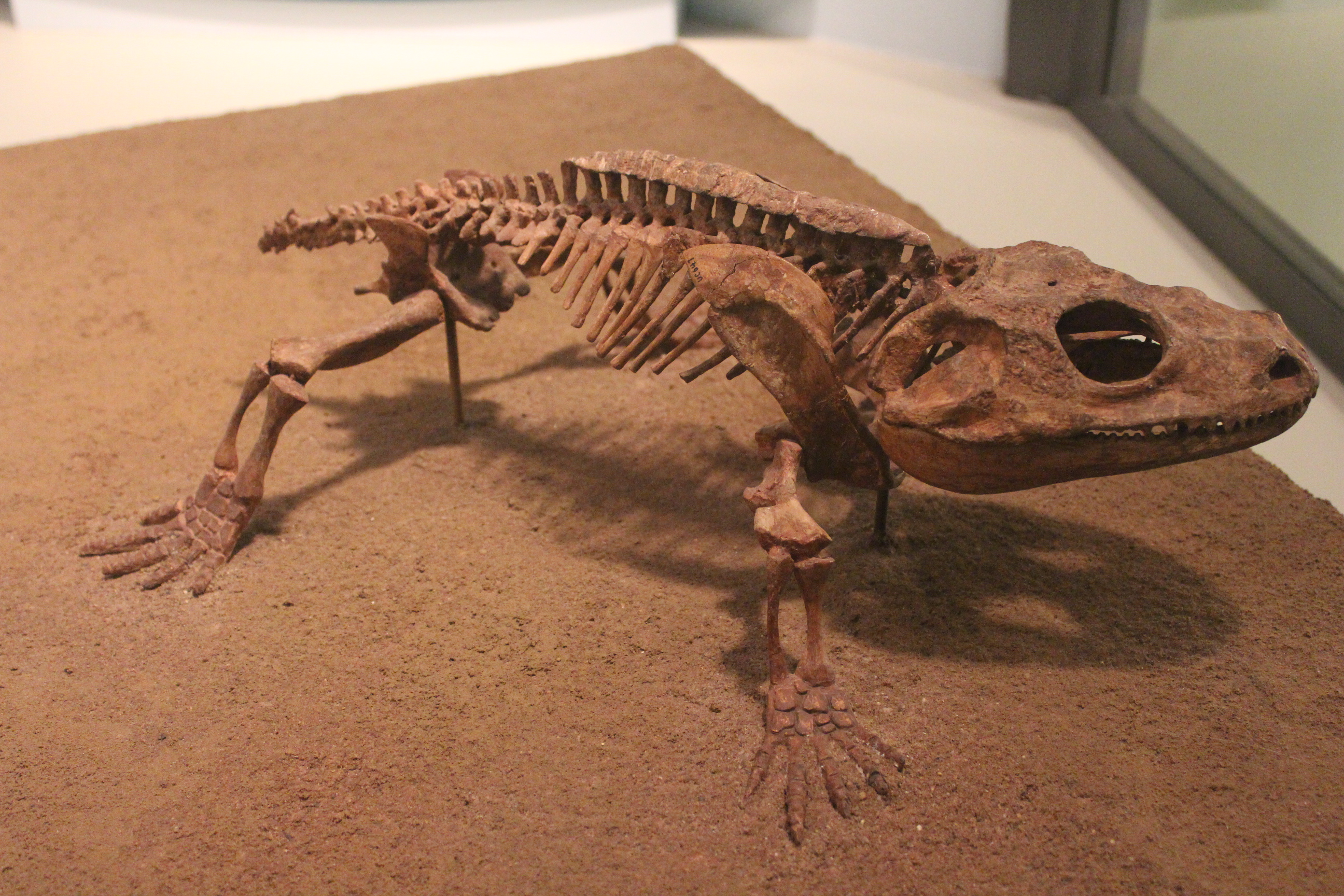
- Skeleton of Cacops aspidephorus in the Field Museum

Scientific classification
- Kingdom: Animalia
- Phylum: Chordata
- Clade: Tetrapoda
- Order: †Temnospondyli
- Family: †Dissorophidae
- Clade: †Eucacopinae
- Genus: †Cacops; Williston, 1910

Species
- †C. aspidephorus Williston, 1910 (type); †C. morrisi Reisz et al., 2009; †C. woehri Fröbisch and Reisz, 2012

= Cacops =

Cacops Temporal range: Early Permian, Kungurian

Extinct genus of amphibians

Cacops ("ugly look" for its strange appearance), is a genus of dissorophid temnospondyls from the Kungurian stage of the early Permian of the United States. Cacops is one of the few olsoniforms (dissorophids and the larger trematopids) whose ontogeny is known. Cacops fossils were almost exclusively known from the Cacops Bone Bed of the Lower Permian Arroyo Formation of Texas for much of the 20th century. New material collected from the Dolese Brothers Quarry, near Richards Spur, Oklahoma in the past few decades has been recovered, painting a clearer picture of what the animal looked and acted like.

== History of discovery ==
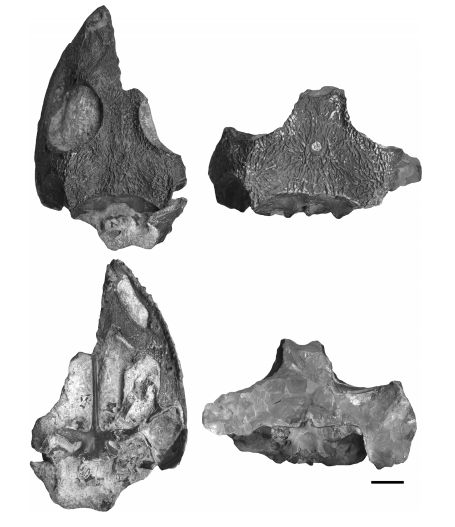
C. woehri holotype

Cacops aspidephorus is the most famous dissorophid, in part due to a majority of its skeleton having been known for over a century. Over 50 specimens have been found in the Cacops Bone Bed in Baylor County, Texas, which is now flooded by the dammed Lake Kemp. However, many of the specimens are covered in calcite, which penetrates the bone tissue, resulting in poor preservation. Trematopsis seltini from the Vale Formation of Texas was originally described as a trematopid by Olson (1956) but was later synonymized with Cacops aspidephorus by Milner (1985).

Cacops morrisi is named in honor of Tony Morris, who discovered one of its two specimens. Many specimens have been found in the Dolese Brothers Limestone Quarry, near Richards Spur, Oklahoma. Cacops morrisi has a skull that differs from C. aspidephorus in having a snout that is slightly longer than its post-orbital region, a shorter distance between the orbit and the temporal emargination, and uncinate processes of the ribs.

Cacops woehri is named in honor of Daniel Woehr, who is an amateur collector of fossils. Specimens have been found in the Dolese Brothers Limestone Quarry, near Richards Spur, Oklahoma. Cacops woehri differs from C. aspidephorus and C. morrisi in many attributes, including a more shallow skull, more dorsally located orbits, and a narrow opening of its tympanic embayment. The contribution of the postparietals to the skull roof also appears to be shorter in C. woehri than in C. morrisi, while the occipital flanges are proportionately larger in C. woehri. More notable differences distinguishable from C. morrisi include: absence of lateral exposure of ectopterygoid in juveniles, absence of tusk-like teeth on the anterior margin of the interpterygoid vacuities, and the quadratojugal lacking an anterior process. The teeth of C. woehri are also not recurved as in C. aspidephorus and C. morrisi, showing instead a distinct lingual curvature. Because of the different skull shape, it is theorized that this specific taxon may have had a different ecology than its sister taxa, possibly with a different prey spectrum. This suggests that there could have been different functional demands for the dissorophoids found at the Oklahoma locality.

== Description ==
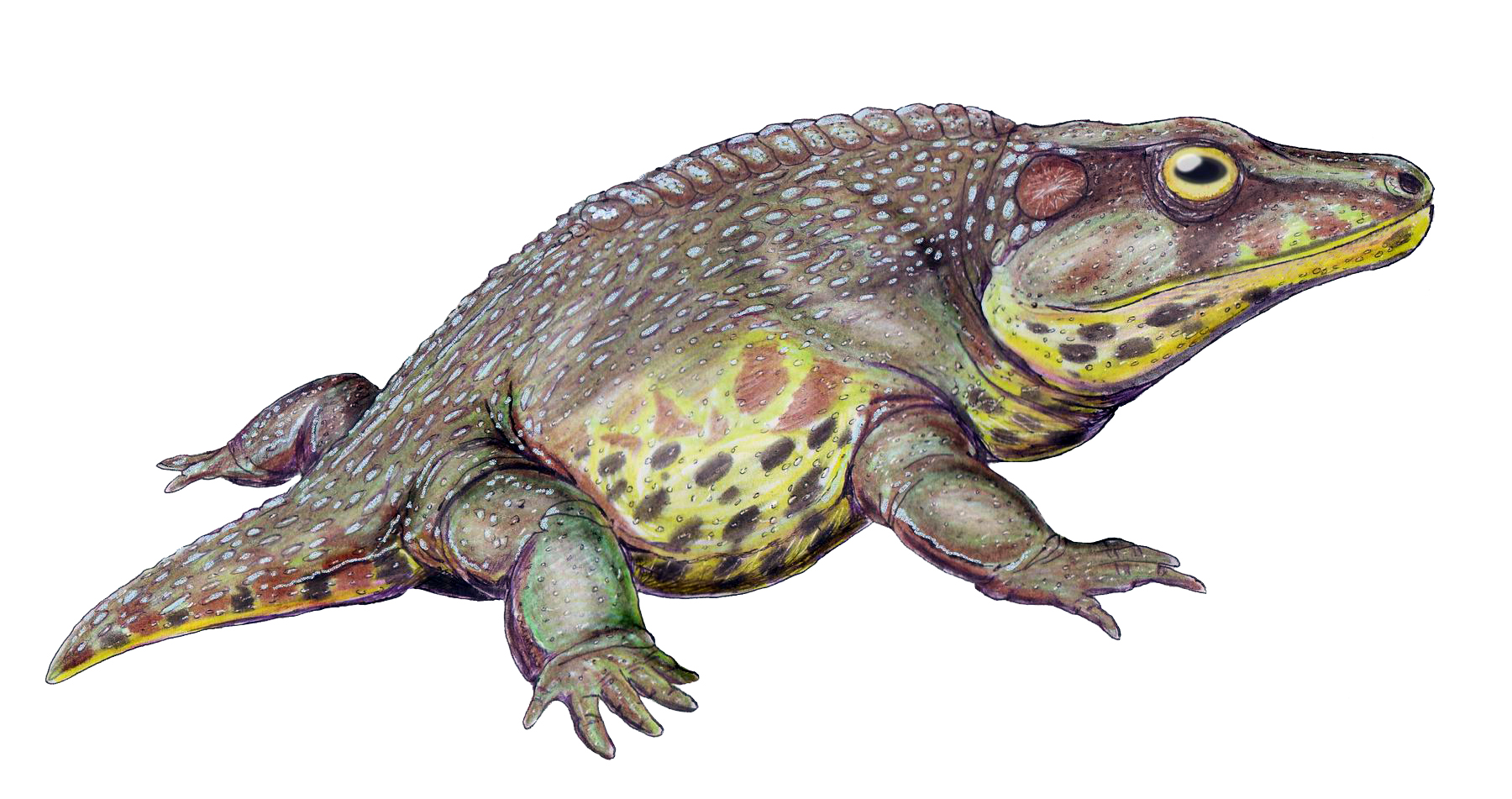
Restoration of C. aspidephorus

American paleontologist Samuel W. Williston used the details of the species Cacops aspidephorus to first describe its features. He noted: "The creature as mounted presents an almost absurd appearance, with its large head and pectoral region, absence of neck, and short tail" (pg. 279), reflected in the name Cacops (from Greek kakos "bad, ugly" and ops "face, look"). However, because of the poor preservation of specimens collected from the Cacops Bone Bed in Texas, other researchers who collected specimens from other localities have described many of Cacops' features with more certainty. Features that distinguish Cacops from other dissorophids include a large dorsal process of the quadrate and a shortened posterior skull.

The skull is very box-like and its cheeks aligned almost at a right angle to the skull table. The external cranial ornamentation is noticeable on the skull table and on top of the ridges that border the numerous depressions. One significant ontogenetic change in Cacops is a more evenly distributed ornamentation in the adults. Like other dissorophids, the temporal region of Cacops' skull was dominated by the tympanic embayment, which likely housed a large tympanum. Marginal teeth are recurved and thinner than in other temnospondyls. Cacops has fewer, but larger, teeth than in most other dissorophids. The palatal dentition consists of recurved tusks larger than the marginal teeth and minute, strongly recurved teeth that cover most of the palatal surface.

Cacops was a medium-sized dissorophid, being smaller than later dissorophids from Eurasia such as Kamacops. Like other dissorophids, Cacops had osteoderms associated with the vertebral column. Internal osteoderms are fused to the neural spines, while external osteoderms overlapped adjacent positions with a ventral flange that inserted between successive internal osteoderms. The osteoderms are associated with only the first 15 vertebrae, beginning at the axis. They are relatively narrow, especially posteriorly, and are subrectangular in dorsal profile, except for the first osteoderm which is more triangular. The osteoderms also have dermal pitting on their dorsal surfaces. The distributions of these pits are not random, but rather found along the raised edges of the midsagittal groove and often in the groove as well.

== Paleobiology ==
=== Ontogeny ===
Partial growth series of both Cacops morrisi and Cacops woehri are known. Overall changes to the shape of the skull are minimal, indicating that the shallower skull of C. woehri is a valid feature for differentiating between the taxa throughout ontogeny. Of the two, the ontogeny of C. morrisi is better known due to more complete material. Ontogenetic changes in C. morrisi include the development of more rugose ornamentation and more even distribution of ornamentation across the skull, loss of a lateral exposure of the ectopterygoid (the 'LEE'), the posterior closure of the otic embayment, and a flatter posterior skull roof. In C. woehri, there are slight changes to a few elements (e.g., postorbital) and changes in proportions to the parasphenoid. Ornamentation does not change as drastically as in C. morrisi.

=== Predation ===
The skull of Cacops has several features associated with predatory behavior. In particular, transverse flanges on the pterygoid that extend below the level of the marginal tooth row have been interpreted to be adaptive for capturing and holding struggling prey; this feature is also seen in the trematopids.

Like many other terrestrial tetrapods, Cacops exhibits evidence of a tympanic membrane in the form of a large, smooth, unornamented flange in the otic notch that bears faint striations inferred to have been the sites of attachment. Among modern amniotes, sensory perception requires a specialized middle ear that collects airborne sounds through a tympanic membrane and delivers the vibrations to the inner ear via multiple structures, including the stapes. Thus, the discovery of a slender stapes in Cacops aspidephorus suggested that Cacops had an ability to hear airborne sound. Early amniotes that were contemporary with Cacops lacked a tympanum; this difference between these terrestrial vertebrates suggests these two groups had very different abilities to hear airborne sound.

=== Locomotion ===
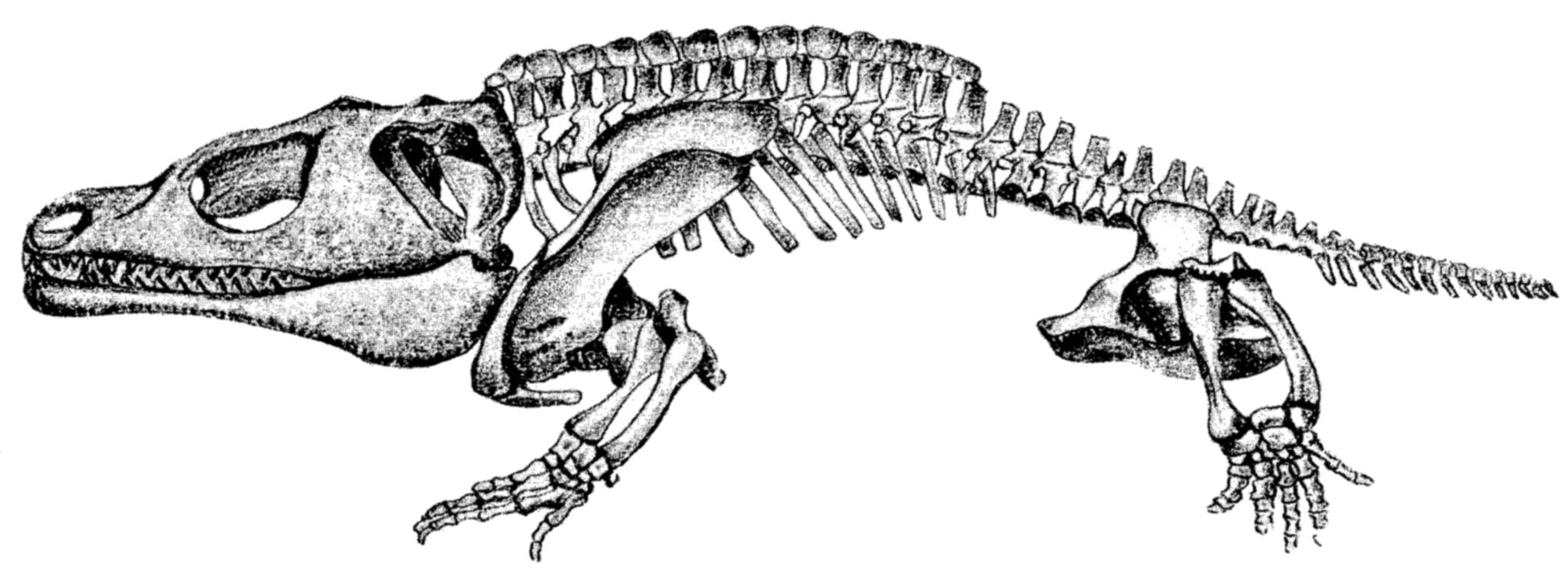
Skeletal restoration by Williston

The locomotion of Cacops aspidephorus has been explored through two studies by David Dilkes. Two series of osteoderms of the presacral vertebral column affect the biomechanics of the axial skeleton. Cacops have an internal series, which consist of an osteoderm fused to the distal tips of each neural spine and an external series, which lie dorsal to and between the segments of the internal series. The portions of the vertebral column with osteoderms had limited lateral flexion, thus limiting lateral movement. The authors suggested that Cacops may have had the ability to move forward in short running spurts or that it may have also used a symmetrical walk similar to modern crocodilians or salamanders, in which its body is supported by opposite movements of the front and hind limbs.
