= Jeanerpeton =

Jeanerpeton Temporal range: Late Carboniferous (Moscovian), 309–307 Ma
- Holotype specimen

Scientific classification
- Kingdom: Animalia
- Phylum: Chordata
- Clade: Tetrapoda
- Order: †Temnospondyli
- Clade: †Amphibamiformes
- Genus: †Jeanerpeton; Sefcovic et al., 2026
- Species: †J. mazonensis

Binomial name
- †Jeanerpeton mazonensis Sefcovic et al., 2026

Genus of extinct temnospondyl

Jeanerpeton (lit. 'Jeans' crawler') is an extinct genus of temnospondyl amphibian in the clade Amphibamiformes, known from the Late Carboniferous (Moscovian age) Mazon Creek fossil beds of Illinois, United States. The genus contains a single species, Jeanerpeton mazonensis, known from a skeleton surrounded by a soft tissue impression of the body.

== Discovery and naming ==
The Jeanerpeton fossil material was discovered in 1965 by Ken Kietzke, an amateur collector, in outcrops of the Carbondale Formation (Francis Creek Shale) near Braidwood, Illinois, US. These rock layers, representing part of the Mazon Creek Lagerstätte, are known for preserving a diverse fauna represented by fossils found in concretions of siderite. Kietzke donated the specimen to the Field Museum of Natural History (FMNH), where it is permanently accessioned in the reptile paleontology collection as specimen FMNH PR 558. It consists of a split concretion preserving a nearly complete skull and skeleton on a part and counterpart. The tail region is missing. The skeleton is surrounded by an impression of the body's soft tissues. An initial report on the specimen was published by Arjan Mann and Bryan M. Gee in 2020, focusing on its soft tissue features.

In 2026, Allison J. Sefcovic and colleagues described Jeanerpeton mazonensis as a new genus and species of amphibamiform based on these fossil remains, designating FMNH PR 558 as the holotype specimen. The generic name, Jeanerpeton, honors the mothers of Sefcovic and Payton J. Kohlberg—two authors of the publication naming this taxon—both of whom are named Jean. This reference is combined with the common temnospondyl (and other early tetrapodomorph) suffix '-erpeton', from the Ancient Greek ἑρπετόν (herpetón), meaning 'crawler' or 'creeping animal'. The specific name, mazonensis, refers to the discovery of the specimen in a Mazon Creek locality.

== Description ==
As is common in vertebrate fossils from Mazon Creek, the bones are preserved as mold-style impressions, with the soft tissue visible as stain on the rock. The skull bones lack ornamentation. The snout is rounded, and its largest component is the lacrimal. The orbit is relatively wide, with 10 scleral ossicles preserved in the orbital region. The maxilla (main upper tooth-bearing bone) is long and low, with 11 teeth preserved, though more would have been present in life. These teeth are homodont (consistent in morphology throughout the toothrow), with a sharply pointed shape. The dentaries (lower tooth-bearing bones) are long and slender. Since the mandible is occluded with the skull, the dentary teeth are not readily visible.

22 presacral vertebrae are visible in the J. mazonensis holotype, two more than are present in the contemporary Amphibamus, but fewer than the plesiomorphic (ancestral) condition of 24, seen in most other amphibamiforms and other terrestrial temnospondyls. As in amphibamids, the ribs are short, becoming shorter toward the pelvis.

=== Soft tissue anatomy ===
A soft tissue impression of the eye is preserved, including traces of pigment and a circular lens. The skin may have been tightly wrapped around the skull, as suggested by the lack of integument traces in this region of the fossil. Skin impressions begin at the base of the skull, smoothly continuing through the cervical (neck) region without significantly narrowing, before expanding for the trunk. The body outline is widest immediately in front of the pelvis. As in living batrachians (frogs + salamanders), the body narrows near the hind limbs. The base of the tail is thick, though most of the tail is not presreved in the holotype. The gastral scales are spindle-shaped and organized in a chevron pattern. These would have been closely associated with the integument on the ventral surface (opposite of the animal's back), as in Amphibamus and other early tetrapods. The dorsal (back region) scales are small and unevenly overlapped, with oval-to-circular shapes. They are ornamented with radiating scallop shell-like ridges.

A rounded gastric bolus (mass of partially digested food) is preserved in the thoracic region. Notably, the J. mazonensis holotype preserves a distinct soft tissue outline of the hindlimb, including expanded toepads at the end of each phalanx, comparable to many living batrachians. A keratinous sheath or claw is not visible, nor are toe webbing or a connective membrane. This represents the first known evidence of toe pads in a non-lissamphibian temnospondyl, and as such, the earliest record of this feature in the fossil record.

== Classification ==
To test the affinities and relationships of Jeanerpeton, Sefcovic et al. (2026) included it in an updated version of the phylogenetic matrix of So et al. (2024). Jeanerpeton was recovered as the sister taxon to a clade formed by Platyrhinops (from Linton, Ohio) and the coeval Amphibamus. These taxa were placed within the dissorophoid temnospondyl clade Amphibamiformes, from which crown-lissamphibians have been suggested to have originated. These results are displayed in the cladogram below, with clades labeled following Schoch (2018):

- Xerodromes
  - †Olsoniformes
  - Amphibamiformes
    - †Micropholis stowi
    - - †Eoscopus lockardi
      - - †Kermitops gratus
        - †Rubeostratilia texensis
        - - †Pasawioops mayi
          - †Plemmyradytes shintoni
          - †Tersomius texensis
        - - †Georgenthalia clavinasica
          - - †Doleserpeton annectens
            - - - †Jeanerpeton mazonensis
                - - †Amphibamus grandiceps
                  - †Platyrhinops lyelli
              - - †Gerobatrachus hottoni
                - - †Xerodromeus gracilis
                  - †Branchiosauridae
                    - †Branchiosaurus salamandroides
                    - - †Apateon spp.
                      - - †Melanerpeton humbergense
                        - - †Leptorophus tener
                          - †Schoenfelderpeton prescheri

'micropholids'
'amphibamids'

== See also ==
- Paleofauna of the Mazon Creek fossil beds
- Amphibamus – a closely related Mazon Creek temnospondyl
