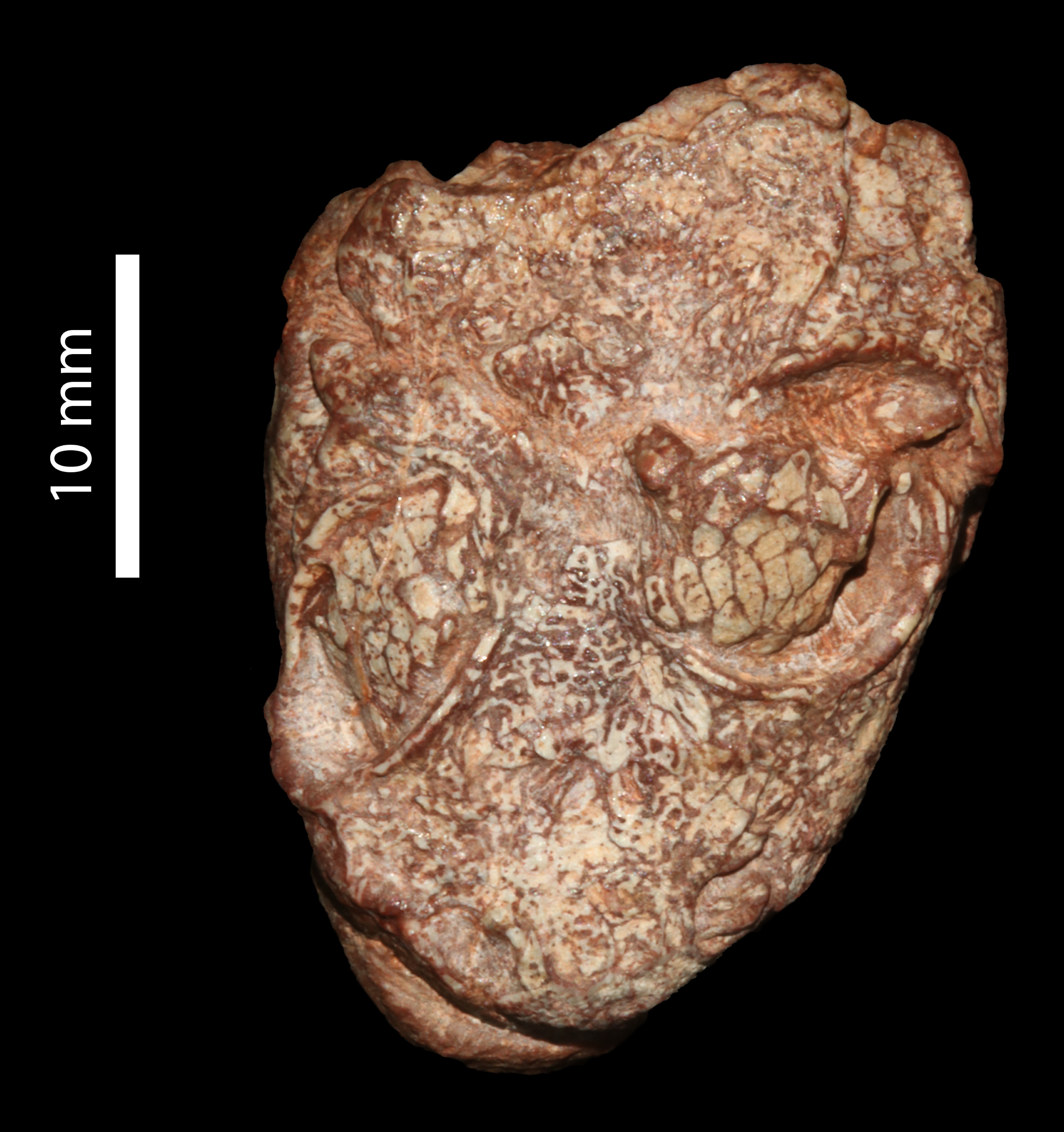
- Holotype specimen

Scientific classification
- Kingdom: Animalia
- Phylum: Chordata
- Clade: Tetrapoda
- Order: †Temnospondyli
- Superfamily: †Dissorophoidea
- Clade: †Amphibamiformes
- Genus: †Kermitops; So et al., 2024
- Species: †K. gratus

Binomial name
- †Kermitops gratus So et al., 2024

= Kermitops =

Kermitops Temporal range: Early Permian (Leonardian), ~270 Ma

Genus of extinct amphibamiform temnospondyls

Kermitops (meaning "Kermit face") is an extinct genus of amphibamiform temnospondyl from the Early Permian Clear Fork Formation of Texas, United States. The genus contains a single species, Kermitops gratus, known from a single skull.

== Discovery and naming ==
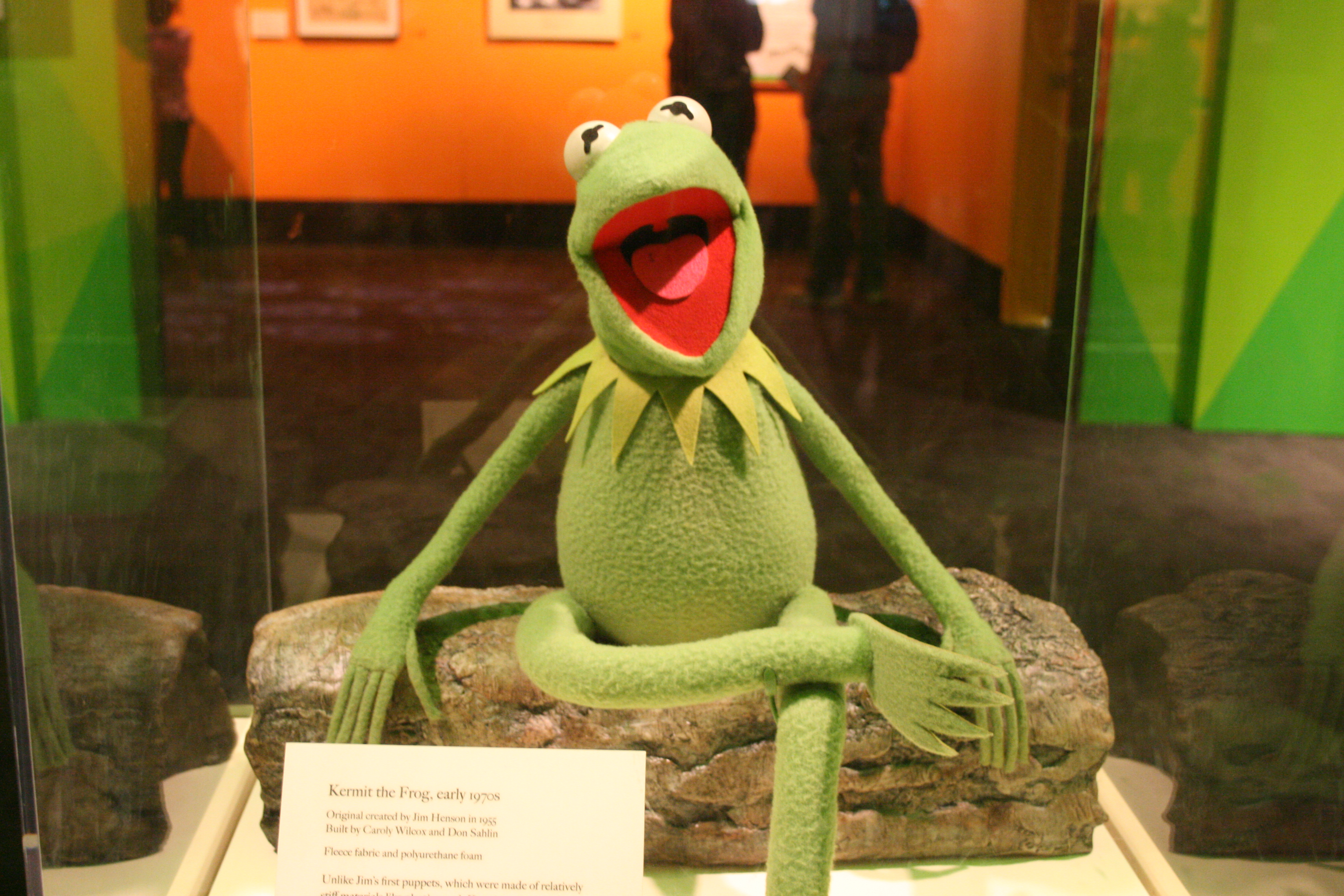
Kermitops was named after Kermit the Frog.

The Kermitops gratus holotype specimen, USNM 407585, was discovered by Nicholas Hotton III and field scientists from the Smithsonian Museum of Natural History in April 1984. The type locality is represented by the lower sediments of the Clear Fork Formation near Lake Kemp in Wilbarger County, Texas, United States. The specimen consists of most of the skull roof, a partial braincase, and the mandibles. Most of the palate is not preserved, except for some incomplete vomerine teeth. The marginal teeth are not readily observable.

In 2024, So, Pardo & Mann described Kermitops gratus as a new genus and species of amphibamiforms based on these fossil remains. The generic name, "Kermitops", combines a reference to Kermit the Frog—the famous amphibian character from the Muppets—with the Greek suffix "-ops", meaning face. The specific name, "gratus", means "gratitude" in Latin, honoring Nicholas Hotton III and the others who aided in collecting the holotype specimen.

== Classification ==
In their 2024 description of Kermitops, So and colleagues performed multiple phylogenetic analyses; the fossil skull preserves an ossified element that may represent the basioccipital, and the coding of this character as "present" or "absent" altered their results. In their Bayesian inference analyses, Kermitops was consistently recovered as the sister taxon to Plemmyradytes. The cladogram with the basioccipital scored as "present" is displayed below:

- - Dendrysekos
  - Trimerorhachis
  - - - Sclerocephalus
      - Acanthostomatops
    - - Perryella
      - Dissorophoidea
        - Micromelerpetidae
        - - Olsoniformes
          - - Eoscopus
            - Amphibamiformes
              - - Kermitops
                - Plemmyradytes
              - - - Rubeostratilia
                  - Micropholidae
                - - Amphibamidae
                  - - Branchiosauridae
                    - - Nanobamus
                      - - Milnererpeton
                        - - - Georgenthalia
                            - Gerobatrachus
                          - - Lissamphibia
