= Richards Spur =

Permian fossil locality in Oklahoma

- Geologic site
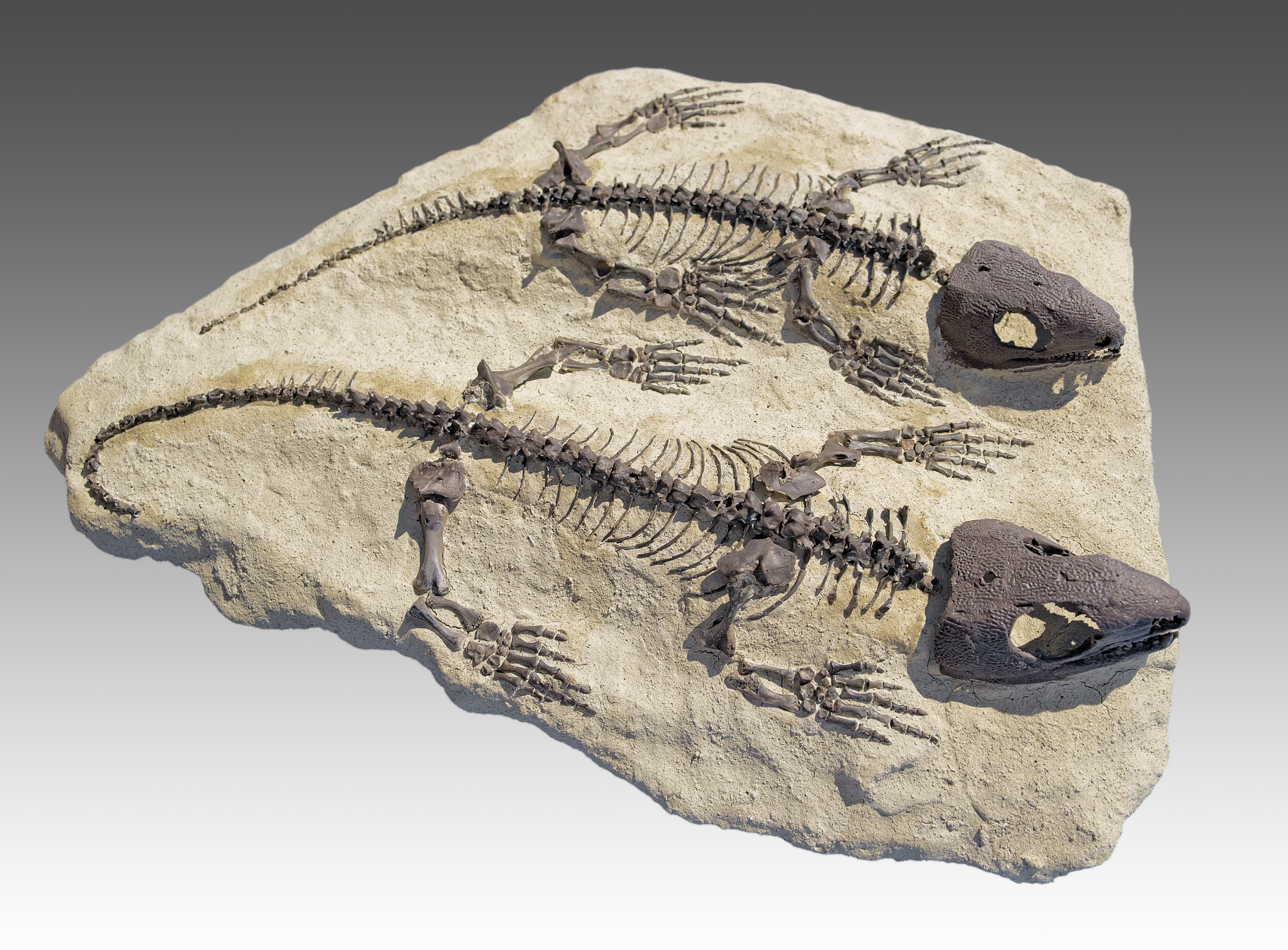
- Artificially assembled Captorhinus aguti fossils found at Richards Spur

- Location within Oklahoma
- Coordinates: 34.77°N 98.40°W
- Location: near Lawton, Oklahoma
- Age: Artinskian (Early Permian, 289.7–283.8 Ma)

Richards Spur is a Permian fossil locality located at the Dolese Brothers Limestone Quarry north of Lawton, Oklahoma. The locality preserves clay and mudstone fissure fills of a karst system eroded out of Ordovician limestone and dolomite, with the infilling dating to the Artinskian stage of the early Permian (Cisuralian), around 289 to 286 million years ago. Fossils of terrestrial animals are abundant and well-preserved, representing one of the most diverse Paleozoic tetrapod communities known. A common historical name for the site is Fort Sill, in reference to the nearby military base. Fossils were first reported at the quarry by workers in 1932, spurring a wave of collecting by local and international geologists. Early taxa of interest included the abundant reptile Captorhinus and microsaurs such as Cardiocephalus and Euryodus. Later notable discoveries include Doleserpeton (one of the most lissamphibian-like Paleozoic tetrapods), the most diverse assortment of parareptiles in the Early Permian, and the rare early diapsid Orovenator.

== Geology ==
The caves of Richards Spur formed in the Ordovician-age Arbuckle Limestone, which was uplifted, exposed, and tilted into a vertical orientation within the Pennsylvanian and Permian. In the early Permian, a karst system formed within the limestone, complete with caves containing speleotherms (stalagmites, stalactites, cave popcorn, etc.) made of calcite. Most of the karsts are narrow, 40–60 cm (16-24 inches) in width, and vertically oriented. Due to active mining at the site constantly destroying and exposing new layers, the layout of the system has not been recorded. Most of the Permian infill is discarded in the quarry's waste dumps without sedimentological and stratigraphic data, hampering studies into those aspects of the locality. However, it is known that the lower sections of the system (25 meters or 82 feet below the surface) lacks fossil material.

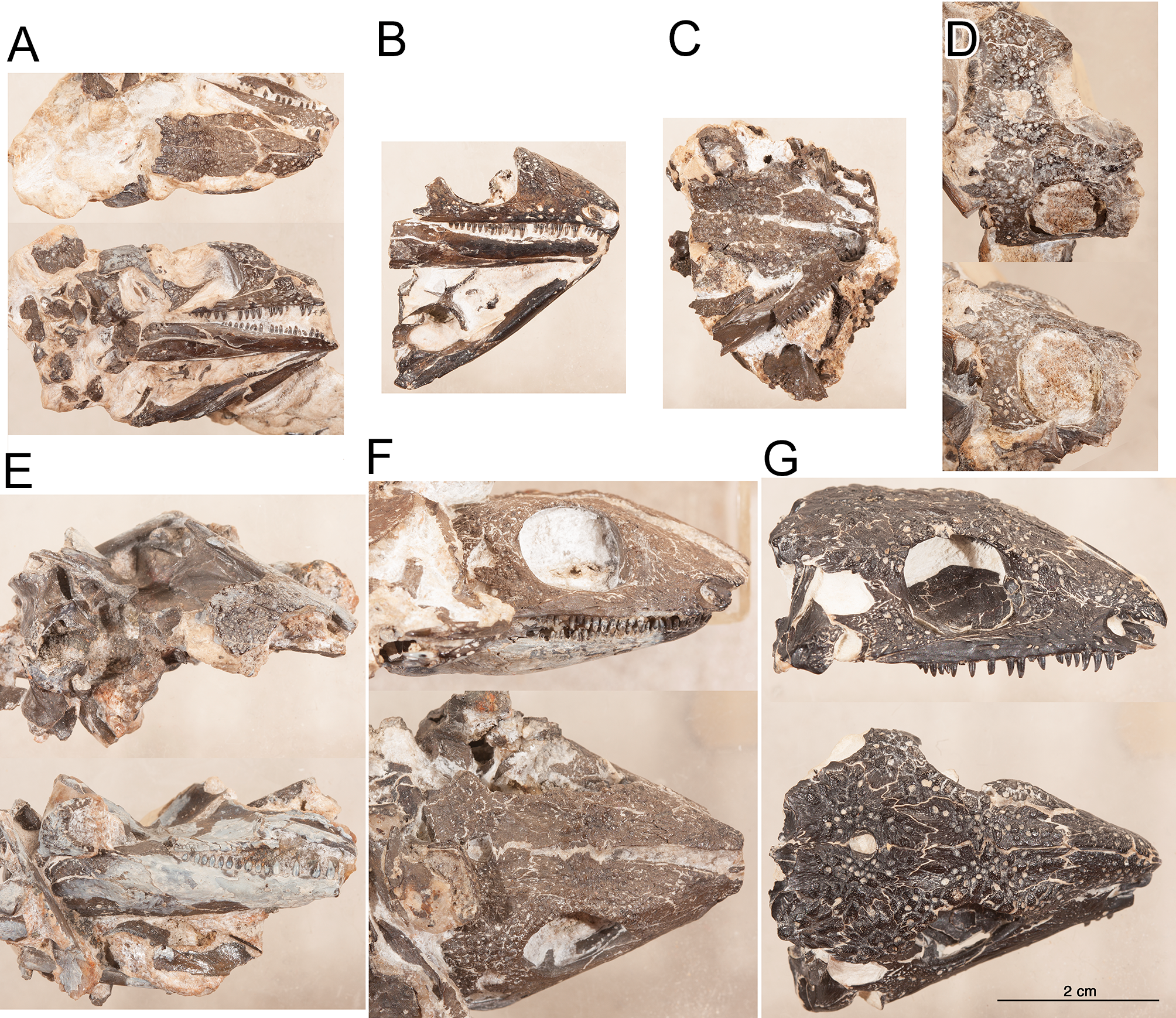
Various skulls of Delorhynchus cifellii recovered from Richards Spur, showing the excellent preservation common to the site.

Many of the fossils of Richards Spur were found in soft calcareous claystone or conglomerate. They likely ended up in the caves as a result of water runoff from the surface, as indicated by the presence of surface minerals such as quartz, kaolinite, and sulfides among the fossils. Individual organisms may have been already disarticulated by scavenging or decomposition on the surface, decomposed within the caves after the fresh corpse had been washed in, or even died within the caves after becoming trapped. Organisms which became disarticulated on the surface experienced more wear and erosion on their fossils, induced by exposure to the elements and transportation by water within and/or outside the karst system. On the other hand, recently deceased or living organism would have been more articulated due to their decomposition occurring in the more stable cave environment, with their tendons keeping their individual bones in place prior to fossilization.

The most complete fossils were encased in a residue which was almost completely calcite, indicating that the cave structures precipitated around their skeletons. The caves likely had to have been submerged in water (or at least persistently humid) for active speleotherm formation, and therefore this mode of spectacular preservation, to have been possible. Some fossils are encrusted by pyrite, indicating the presence of anoxic fluids or diagenesis in the systems at some point. Most (but not all) fossils are stained a dark color by seepage of hydrocarbons into the deposits. These assorted biochemical conditions are the likely cause of unusually variable Carbon isotope values found within different preserved speleotherms.

== Paleoenvironment ==
Isotope analysis of preserved speleotherms shows several regular fluctuations in δ^{18}O levels within a time span of 1-20 thousand years. Similar fluctuations in modern low-latitude environments are considered to be indicative of strong variation in precipitation between wet and arid periods on the scales of centuries or millennia. Some trace elements agree with this data, as Barium and Phosphorus concentrations increase with higher δ^{18}O (drier periods); this is explained by increased incorporation of dust and seafoam in drier, windier periods, as demonstrated by climatological analyses in a modern cave system in Israel.

Other than exceedingly rare fragments of xenacanthids and eryopoids, aquatic animals are practically absent from Richards Spur. Although amphibians are common at the site, most of them are terrestrially-adapted taxa such as dissorophoids, microsaurs, and seymouriamorphs. This is in strong contrast to contemporary floodplain environments in Oklahoma and Texas, which have abundant fossils of aquatic animals like Eryops and Diplocaulus, along with large lowland amniotes like Edaphosaurus. As a result, the site is considered to represent animals living in a drier environment upland from the humid floodplains which preserve most of the Permian red beds. The only other productive Early Permian geological locale commonly considered to preserve an upland community is the Tambach Formation of Germany.

=== Age ===
The unique preservational environment of Richards Spur precludes geological stratigraphy. Based on the faunal composition (particularly the abundance of Captorhinus aguti, Cardiocephalus, and Euryodus), Richards Spur has been considered roughly equivalent in age to the Arroyo Formation (Lower Clear Fork) of Texas. In Oklahoma, the equivalent may be the upper Garber Formation or lower Hennessey Formation. The South Grandfield site of the Hennessey Formation is an example of a more typical Oklahoman fossil locale which has similar captorhinid and microsaur taxa to Richards Spur. To determine the absolute age of the Richards Spur deposits, the speleotherm studied for the Oxygen isotope and trace element analyses was also sampled for Uranium-Lead dating. It was determined that the speleotherm was formed between 289.68 and 288.32 million years ago. This time period was originally stated to be Sakmarian in age, but after a later refinement to the ICS timescale, it was specified as belonging to the early Artinskian. Two more speleotherms studied later gave date ranges of 283.8 to 289.6 Ma, and 286.0 to 286.4 Ma, indicating that the locality was deposited over several million years.

== Paleobiota ==
=== Temnospondyls ===
Large Eryops-like fragments are rare at the site. The site has also produced extensive postcranial remains, including partial skeletons, belonging to large unnamed dissorophoids.

Temnospondyls of Richards Spur
Genus	Species	Notes	Images
Acheloma	A. cryptatheria	A trematopid.	
Acheloma	A. dunni	A trematopid, potentially a junior synonym of Acheloma cumminsi.	
Acheloma	A. sp.	Juvenile trematopids similar to Acheloma and Phonerpeton.	
Aspidosaurus	A. chiton	A dissorophid.	
Cacops	C. morrisi	A dissorophid.	
Cacops	C. woehri	A dissorophid.	
Dissorophus	D. multicinctus	A dissorophid.	
Doleserpeton	D. annectens	An amphibamid, potentially one of the closest Permian-age relatives of living amphibians (lissamphibians).	
Pasawioops	P. mayi	A micropholid amphibamiform.	
Tersomius	T. dolesensis	A micropholid amphibamiform.	

=== Recumbirostrans ===
Recumbirostran microsaurs are typically classified as amphibians (non-amniote tetrapods), but some studies, starting in 2017, suggest that they may instead be a group of sauropsids (amniotes related to modern reptiles).

Recumbirostran microsaurs of Richards Spur
Genus	Species	Notes	Images
Cardiocephalus	C. peabodyi	A gymnarthrid.	
Euryodus	E. sp.	A gymnarthrid. The Richards Spur material is not referable to any existing Euryodus species. Some Richards Spur specimens of the captorhinid Opisthodontosaurus carrolli were originally mistaken as E. primus.	
Llistrofus	L. pricei	A hapsidopareiid. Llistrofus is potentially a junior synonym of Hapsidopareion.	
Nannaroter	N. mckinziei	An ostodolepid.	

=== Other amphibians ===
Other amphibians of Richards Spur
Genus	Species	Notes	Images
Seymouria	S. sp.	A seymouriamorph.	
Sillerpeton	S. permianum	A legless phlegethontiid aistopod, only represented by a few braincases and vertebrae.	

=== Synapsids ===
The family Varanopidae are typically classified as synapsids (amniotes related to mammals), but some studies, starting in 2018, suggest that they may instead be a group of sauropsids (amniotes related to modern reptiles). One varanopid specimen preserves fused tail vertebrae, a sign of metabolic bone disease similar to Paget's disease.

Putative synapsids of Richards Spur
Genus	Species	Notes	Images
Arisierpeton	A. simplex	A caseid.	
Basicranodon	B. fortsillensis	A nomen dubium based on braincase fragments similar to Mesenosaurus and Mycterosaurus.	
Dimetrodon	D. sp.	A sphenacodontid. Dimetrodon is very rare at Richards Spur, represented by a single neural spine fragment. Sphenacodontid jaw fragments are also found at the site.	
Mesenosaurus	M. efremovi	A varanopid.	
Mycterosaurus	M. longiceps	A varanopid.	
Oromycter	O. dolesorum	A caseid.	
Thrausmosaurus	T. serratidens	A nomen dubium named for varanopid jaw fragments initially mistaken for sphenacodontid remains.	
Varanops	V. brevirostris	A varanopid.	

=== Sauropsids ===
"Parareptiles" are a set of early sauropsids (amniotes related to modern reptiles) which are traditionally classified as a clade (a group with a single shared ancestor), but some studies, starting in 2020, suggest that they may instead be a collection of various unrelated early reptiles. The family Captorhinidae are typically classified as sauropsids, but some studies, starting in 2022, suggest that they may instead be outside of the crown group of amniotes.

Several juvenile captorhinid tail vertebrae preserve fracture planes, allowing the tail to drop off in a process known as caudal autotomy, similar to some modern lizards.

Putative sauropsids of Richards Spur
Genus	Species	Notes	Images
Abyssomedon	A. williamsi	A nyctiphruretid procolophonian.	
Baeotherates	B. fortsillensis	A captorhinid.	
Bolosaurus	B. grandis	A bolosaurid "parareptile".	
Bolterpeton	B. carrolli	A junior synonym of Delorhynchus, initially misidentified as a microsaur jaw.	
Captorhinus	C. aguti	A captorhinid.	
Captorhinus	C. kierani	A captorhinid.	
Captorhinus	C. magnus	A captorhinid.	
Colobomycter	C. pholeter	An acleistorhinid "parareptile".	
Colobomycter	C. vaughni	An acleistorhinid "parareptile".	
Delorhynchus	D. cifellii	An acleistorhinid "parareptile".	
Delorhynchus	D. multidentatus	An acleistorhinid "parareptile".	
Delorhynchus	D. priscus	An acleistorhinid "parareptile".	
Feeserpeton	F. oklahomensis	An acleistorhinid "parareptile".	
Klastomycter	K. conodentatus	An acleistorhinid "parareptile".	
Labidosauriscus	L. richardi	A captorhinid.	
Maiothisavros	M. dianeae	A basal neodiapsid.	
Microleter	M. mckinzieorum	An early sauropsid, usually regarded as a "parareptile".	
Opisthodontosaurus	O. carrolli	A captorhinid.	
Orovenator	O. mayorum	A basal neodiapsid with similarities to varanopids.	

=== Invertebrates ===
Fragments of arthropod cuticle have been found stuck among the palatal teeth of Delorhynchus cifellii.

Invertebrates of Richards Spur
Genus	Species	Notes	Images
Dolesea	D. subtila	An indeterminate millipede.	
Karstiulus	K. fortsillensis	A xyloiuloid millipede.	
Oklahomasoma	O. richardsspurense	A juliform millipede.	
