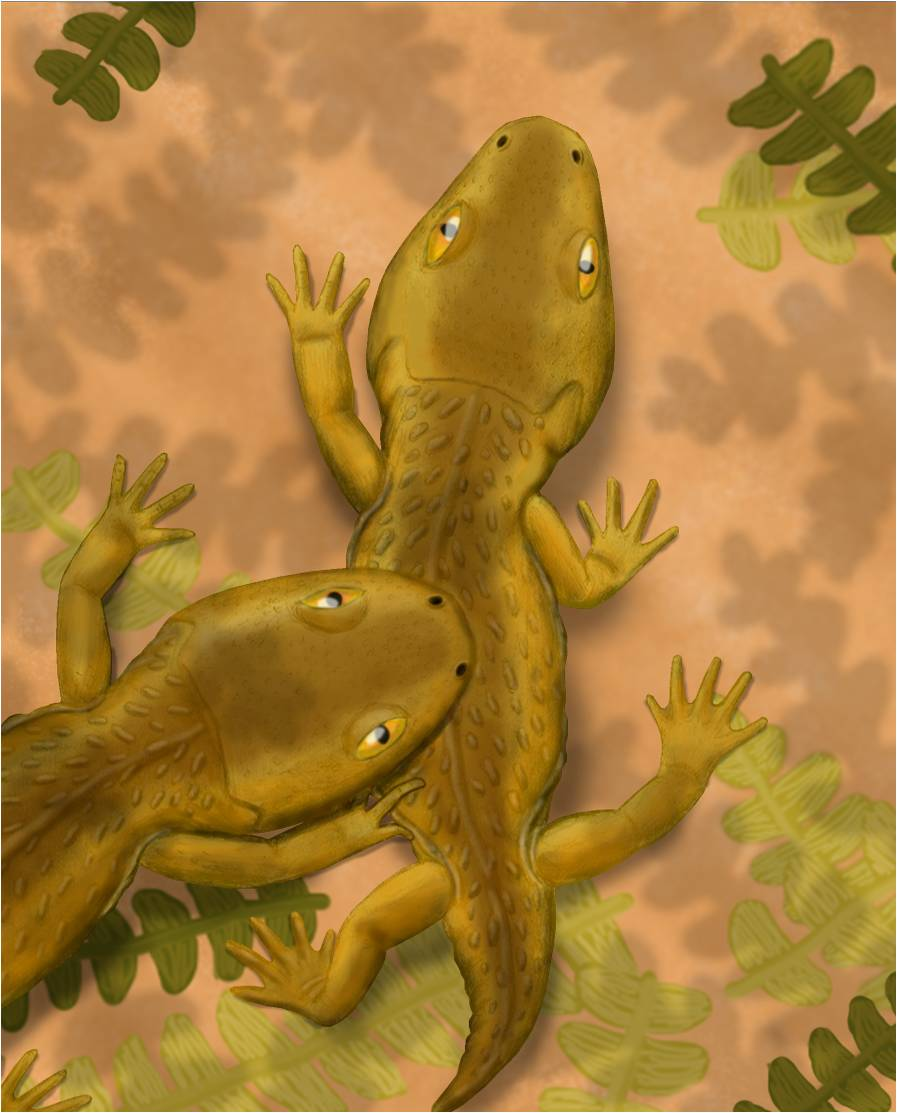

Scientific classification
- Kingdom: Animalia
- Phylum: Chordata
- Clade: Tetrapoda
- Order: †Temnospondyli
- Family: †Micropholidae
- Genus: †Micropholis; Huxley, 1859

Species
- M. stowi Huxley, 1859 (type)

Synonyms
- Petrophryne Owen, 1876

= Micropholis (amphibian) =

Micropholis Temporal range: Early Triassic

Extinct genus of amphibian from the early Triassic of South Africa

Micropholis (Greek 'mikros' = small and 'pholis' = scale) is an extinct genus of dissorophoid temnospondyl. Fossils have been found from the Lystrosaurus Assemblage Zone of the Karoo Basin in South Africa and are dated to the Induan (Early Triassic). Fossils have also been found from the lower Fremouw of Antarctica. Micropholis is the only post-Permian dissorophoid and the only dissorophoid in what is presently the southern hemisphere and what would have been termed Gondwana during the amalgamation of Pangea.

== History of study ==
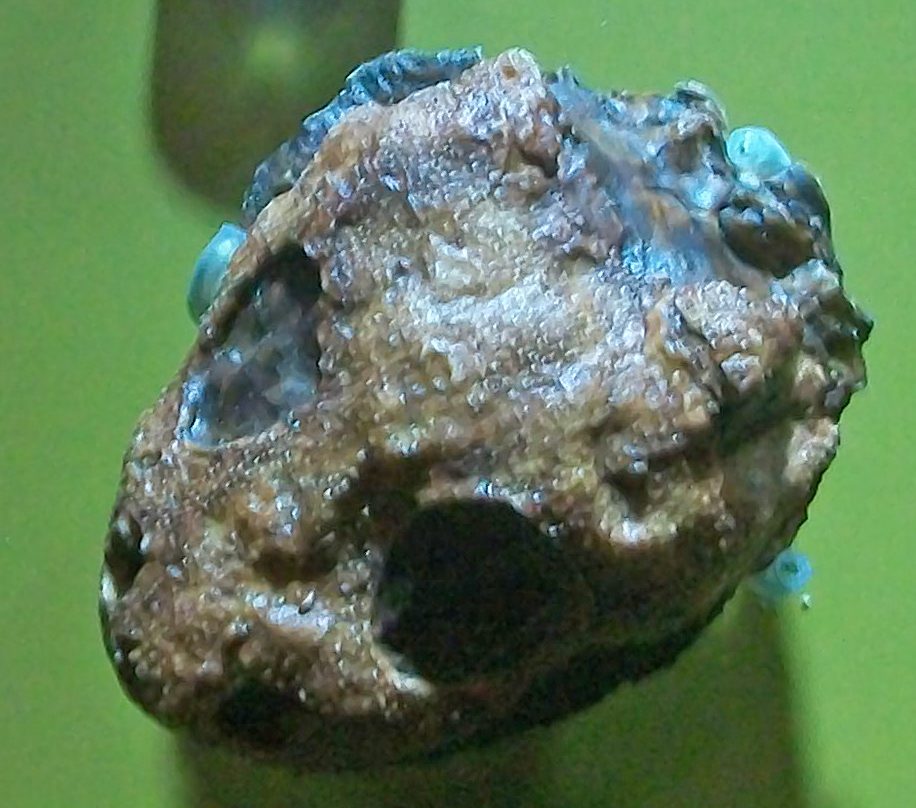
FMNH PR 5105, cast of skull of M. stowi in the Field Museum of Natural History.

Micropholis was one of the first dissorophoids to be named by English paleontologist Thomas Huxley in 1859 based on a partial skull. Micropholis stowii (properly Micropholis stowi), the type species, is named for George William Stow, the South African geologist and ethnologist who discovered the specimen and who proposed that it represented some extinct amphibian. English paleontologist Richard Owen later named a new genus and species, Petrophryne granulata, for a better-known skull, also from the Karoo Basin, that he suggested might be the same animal as M. stowi; this synonymy was eventually accepted by other workers. Additional description was furnished by German paleontologists Ferdinand Broili and Joachim Schröder in 1937. The taxon was most recently revised by German paleontologist Jürgen Boy in 1985 and again in 2005 by German paleontologist Rainer Schoch and South African paleontologist Bruce Rubidge. Micropholis has been repeatedly incorporated in phylogenetic analyses of temnospondyls and dissorophoids. In 2015, American paleontologist Julia McHugh published a description of histological patterns in Micropholis.

== Description ==
Practically the entire skeleton of Micropholis is now known. Many specimens have been found, a number of which are on blocks preserving partial to complete skeletons of multiple individuals in close association, and two distinct morphotypes are evident, differing in skull width and palatal dentition.

The "slender-headed" morph is defined by corresponding narrowing of many features and cranial elements, differences in dentition on the vomer, and possibly by smaller and more numerous maxillary teeth when compared with the "broad-headed" morph. Additionally, a wide size range of individuals are known, ranging from skull lengths around 20 mm to over 40 mm. There remains some uncertainty about whether the slender-headed morph is an advanced ontogenetic stage, as the largest individuals all exhibit this skull morphology. Schoch & Milner (2014) identified 10 features in the diagnosis of Micropholis:

(1) dermal ornament, with irregularly spaced pustules;
(2) accessory fangs on the vomer;
(3) unpaired anterior palatal fenestra (sometimes 'fontanelle');
(4) palatine and ectopterygoid reduces to struts along medial maxillary margin;
(5) short basipterygoid ramus of pterygoid;
(6) basal plate with prominent posterolateral horns;
(7) hyobranchial skeleton well ossified;
(8) short tail;
(9) elongate skull table (plesiomorphy); and
(10) postparietal much longer than tabular (plesiomorphy).

== Phylogenetic relationships ==
When it was first described, Micropholis was recognized as a 'labyrinthodont,' an outdated term used to refer to extinct 'amphibians' in a broad sense. However, Huxley remarked that it did not show close affinities with any of the known Triassic labyrinthodonts of the time. Its uncertain affinities continued to plague paleontologists who remarked that "no types really closely allied to it have been found". As a result, it was placed within its own family, Micropholidae, and sometimes within its own superfamily, Micropholoidea. Although it was suggested in the 1930s that Micropholis might be allied with dissorophoids by comparison with the dissorophid Broiliellus, this idea was not widely adopted until the 1960s. Subsequent discovery of amphibamiforms, either referred to monotaxic families such as Doleserpetontidae or to Dissorophidae, has further strengthened the placement of Micropholis among dissorophoids, which has since been maintained by computer-assisted phylogenetic analyses. Micropholis now belongs to the recently resurrected family Micropholidae, which is included in what was historically termed Amphibamidae (now Amphibamiformes). However, its placement has long been perplexing because it retains numerous plesiomorphies and is usually recovered as one of the earlier diverging amphibamiforms despite being tens of millions of years younger than all other dissorophoids.

Below is a phylogeny from Schoch (2018) showing the position of Micropholis.

- - Olsoniformes
  - Amphibamiformes
    - Eoscopus
    - - Platyrhinops
      - - Micropholidae
          - Tersomius
          - - - Pasawioops
              - Micropholis
        - - Amphibamidae
            - Doleserpeton
            - Amphibamus
          - - - - Gerobatrachus
                - Georgenthalia
              - - Lissamphibia
                  - Eocaecilia
                  - - Karaurus
                    - Triadobatrachus
            - Branchiosauridae
              - Branchiosaurus
              - Apateon
              - - Leptorophus
                - Schoenfelderpeton
