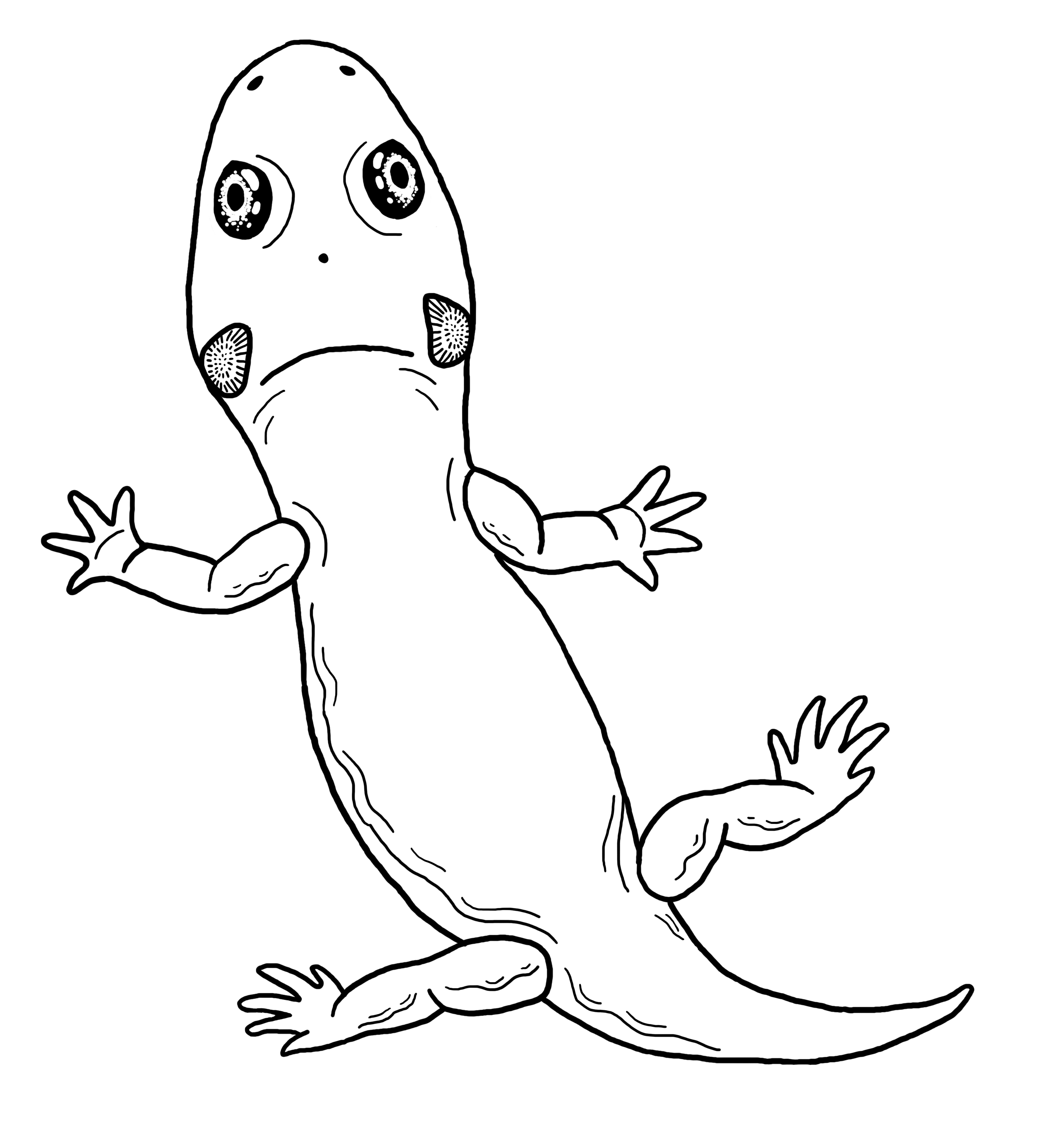
- Restoration of Rubeostratilia texensis

Scientific classification
- Kingdom: Animalia
- Phylum: Chordata
- Clade: Tetrapoda
- Order: †Temnospondyli
- Clade: †Amphibamiformes
- Genus: †Rubeostratilia; Bourget and Anderson, 2011

Type species
- †Rubeostratilia texensis Bourget and Anderson, 2011

= Rubeostratilia =

Rubeostratilia Temporal range: Early Permian

Extinct genus of amphibians

Rubeostratilia is an extinct genus of amphibamiform temnospondyl from the early Permian of Texas. It is known from a single skull. This genus was named by Hélène Bourget and Jason S. Anderson in 2011, and the type species is Rubeostratilia texensis. The genus name comes from the Latin translation of 'redbeds' in reference to the Texas redbeds that produced both the holotype and many other early Permian fossils. The specific name is for the state of Texas. The holotype and only known specimen was collected in 1941 from the Nocona Formation exposures in Clay County by a Works Projects Administration project that was transferred to the Field Museum of Natural History through an interinstitutional exchange with the Texas Memorial Museum.

== Anatomy ==
Rubeostratilia is differentiated from other amphibamiforms by: (1) a pterygoid sutured only to the ectopterygoid anteriorly; and (2) the presence of four, equally sized foramina along the surface of the lacrimal that forms the anterior orbital margin. It shares a number of features with Pasawioops mayi, which at the time was known only from the Richards Spur locality in Oklahoma but which was subsequently reported from the Archer City Formation in Texas.

== Relationships ==
The relationships of Rubeostratilia are unstable, which Bourget & Anderson (2011) ascribed to the influence of both missing data and changes to a small number of character codings that produced drastically different results of amphibamiform phylogeny.

Below is the result of the parsimony analysis from Bourget & Anderson (2011) when coding for Plemmyradytes shintoni was left unchanged:

- Amphibamiformes
  - - Eoscopus
    - - Platyrhinops
      - - Georgenthalia
        - - Doleserpeton
          - - Gerobatrachus
            - Amphibamus
  - - Rubeostratilia
    - - Pasawioops
      - - Tersomius
        - - Micropholis
          - Plemmyradytes

Below is the result of the analysis from Bourget & Anderson (2011) with a number of proposed coding changes:

- Amphibamiformes
  - Micropholis
  - - Tersomius
    - - Pasawioops
      - - Rubeostratilia
        - - - Plemmyradytes
            - Eoscopus
          - - Platyrhinops
            - - Georgenthalia
              - - Doleserpeton
                - - Gerobatrachus
                  - Amphibamus

Below is the result of the analysis from Maddin et al. (2013), derived from the matrix of Fröbisch & Reisz (2008):

- Amphibamiformes
  - - Eoscopus
    - - Plemmyradytes
      - - Platyrhinops
        - - Doleserpeton
          - - Amphibamus
            - - Gerobatrachus
              - - Georgenthalia
                - Branchiosauridae
  - - Tersomius dolesensis
    - - - Tersomius texensis
        - Rubeostratilia
      - - Micropholis
        - Pasawioops
