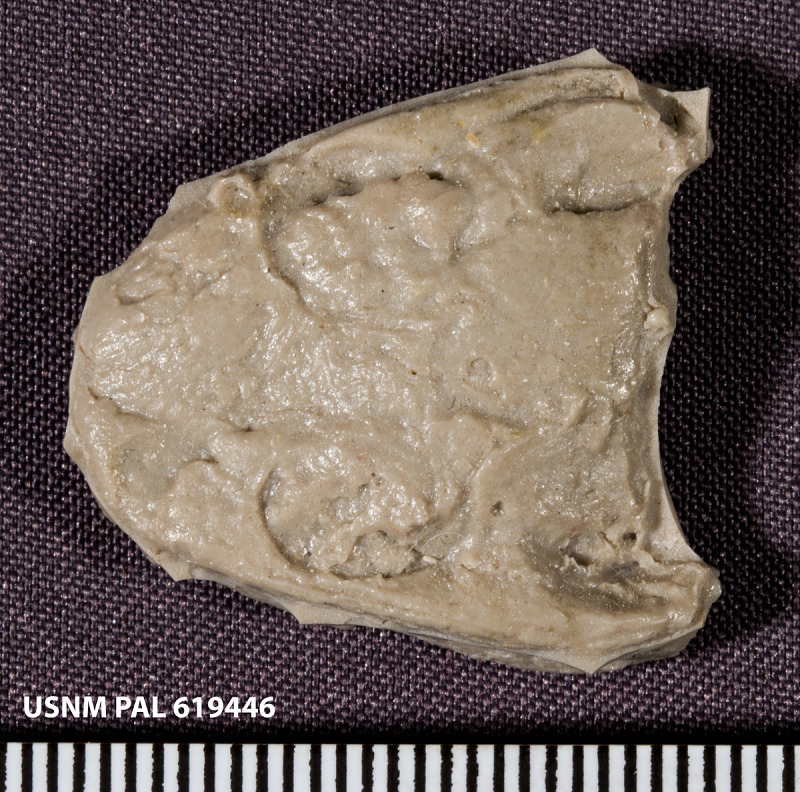
- T. dolesensis skull

Scientific classification
- Kingdom: Animalia
- Phylum: Chordata
- Clade: Tetrapoda
- Order: †Temnospondyli
- Family: †Micropholidae
- Genus: †Tersomius; E. C. Case, 1910

Type species
- Tersomius texensis E.C. Case, 1910

Species
- Tersomius dolesensis; Tersomius mosesi; Tersomius texensis

= Tersomius =

Tersomius Temporal range: Early Permian, 279.5–272.5 Ma

Extinct genus of amphibians

Tersomius is an extinct genus of dissorophoid temnospondyl within the family Micropholidae. It is known from the early Permian of North America (Oklahoma and Texas).

== History of study ==
Tersomius was first named in 1910 by American paleontologist E.C. Case based on a partial skull collected from the Archer City Formation of Texas. The type species is T. texensis, in reference to its geographic provenance. The brief original description was supplemented by a lengthier redescription of the holotype and description of new material by Carroll (1964). At least two of these specimens do not belong to any species of Tersomius and were reassigned by Maddin et al. (2013), which has led some authors to consider it as a potential "wastebasket taxon." Material referred to Tersomius cf. texensis was reported from the early Permian South Grandfield locality in Oklahoma by Daly (1973).

A second species of Tersomius, T. mosesi, was named by Olson (1970) for Amos Moses, the property owner of the land in Oklahoma where the material was collected from. There are several dozen reported specimens for T. mosesi, but almost all of them are in poor condition and the osteology of this species remains poorly understood. Olson differentiated it from T. texensis mostly on the basis of notably fewer marginal teeth in the jaw. A third species of Tersomius, T. dolesensis, was named by Anderson & Bolt (2013) from the Richards Spur locality in Oklahoma. It is differentiated from all other amphibamiforms by the presence of enlarged teeth along the palatine ramus of the vomer and is distinguished from T. texensis by a posteriorly restricted postorbital and a posteriorly extensive jugal.

== Anatomy ==
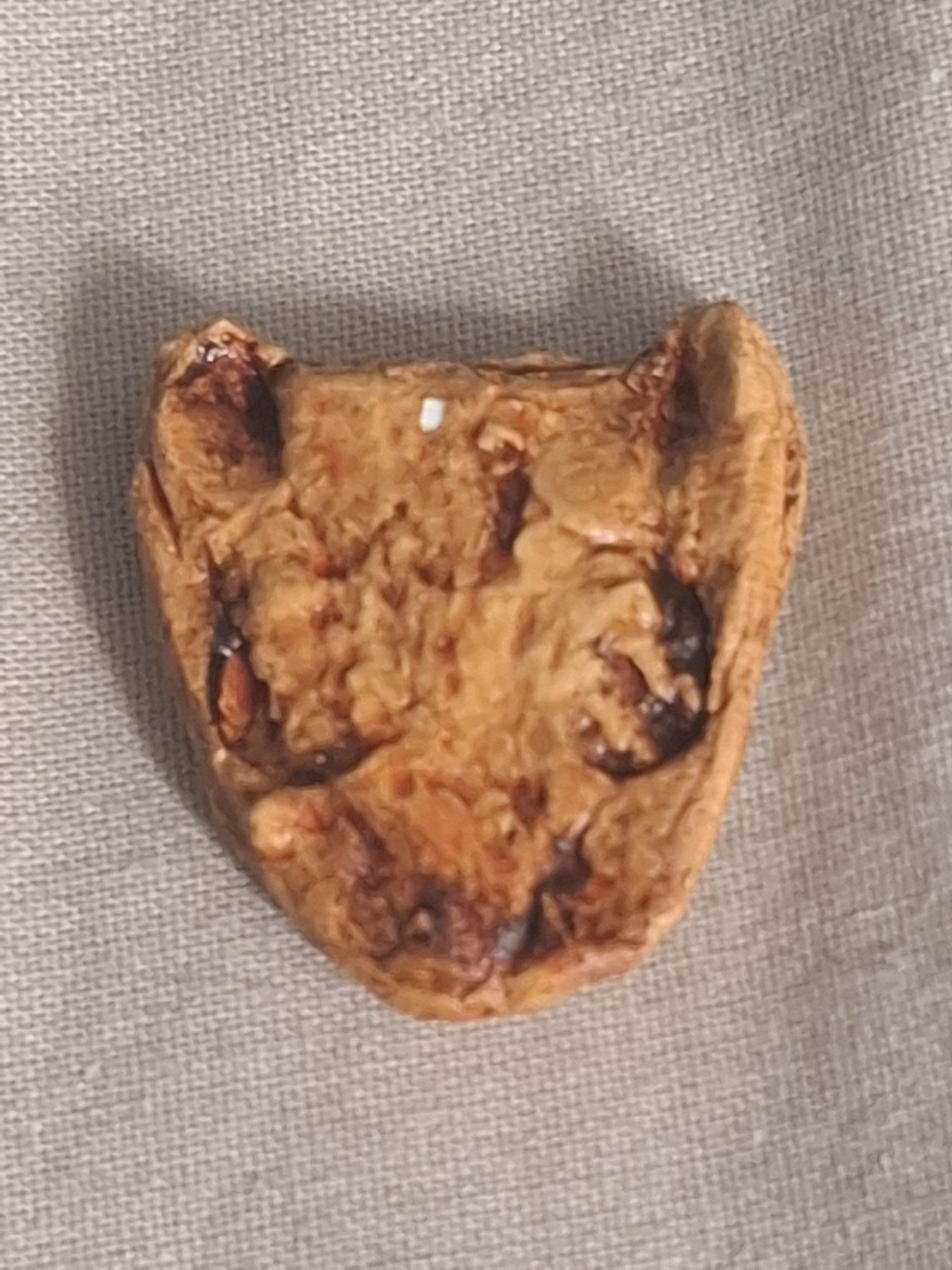
Replica skull

The most recent revision of the genus is that of Schoch & Milner (2014), who list a combination of seven features and two plesiomorphies: (1) nearly circular outline of skull with curved maxilla; (2) prefrontal and postfrontal separated; (3) preorbital region equal to skull table in length; (4) internarial fenestra present; (5) teeth variably monocuspid and bicuspid; (6) vomer with both medial and lateral fangs; (7) palatine lacking denticles; (8) long supratemporal; (9) postparietal longer than tabular. Most of these features are not unique to Tersomius (the combination being unique), as evidenced by the diagnosis of Anderson & Bolt (2013), who list an elongate tabular and a medial curvature of the maxillary arcade at the position of the quadrate (shared with Doleserpeton, T. texensis, and Micropholis) as diagnostic. The poor understanding of T. mosesi often leads it to be excluded in discussion or diagnosing of the genus.

== Relationships ==
Like other amphibamiforms that were described early in the 20th century, Tersomius has sometimes been listed as a dissorophid, but this was often the result of a lack of distinction between amphibamiforms and dissorophids for much of the 20th century. Its position within Amphibamiformes (the traditional Amphibamidae) is well-supported by modern computer-assisted phylogenetic analyses. Tersomius texensis is usually utilized as the representative of the genus in most analyses in which it is recovered as being closely related to Micropholis and Pasawioops, forming the Micropholidae. Below is a phylogeny of dissorophoids from Schoch (2018):

- Xerodromes
  - Olsoniformes
  - Amphibamiformes
    - Eoscopus
    - - Platyrhinops
      - - Micropholidae
          - Tersomius
          - - - Pasawioops
              - Micropholis
        - - Amphibamidae
            - Doleserpeton
            - Amphibamus
          - - - - Gerobatrachus
                - Georgenthalia
              - - Lissamphibia
                  - Eocaecilia
                  - - Karaurus
                    - Triadobatrachus
            - Branchiosauridae
              - Branchiosaurus
              - Apateon
              - - Leptorophus
                - Schoenfelderpeton

The placement of Tersomius dolesensis within Tersomius remains somewhat disputed because it is not recovered as the sister taxon of T. texensis in recent analyses by Anderson & Bolt (2013; the original description) and Maddin et al. (2013). In the former, T. texensis was excluded from the analysis, and T. dolesensis was recovered as the sister taxon to Plemmyradytes. In the latter, both species of Tersomius were included and were not resolved as sister taxa. Below is the result of the analysis of Maddin et al. (2013):

- Amphibamiformes
  - - Eoscopus
    - - Plemmyradytes
      - - Platyrhinops
        - - Doleserpeton
          - - Amphibamus
            - - Gerobatrachus
              - - Georgenthalia
                - Branchiosauridae
  - - Tersomius dolesensis
    - - - Tersomius texensis
        - Rubeostratilia
      - - Micropholis
        - Pasawioops

== See also ==
- Prehistoric amphibian
- List of prehistoric amphibians
