= Plemmyradytes =

Plemmyradytes Temporal range: Lower Permian, 298 Ma

Scientific classification
- Domain: Eukaryota
- Kingdom: Animalia
- Phylum: Chordata
- Order: †Temnospondyli
- Clade: †Amphibamiformes
- Genus: †Plemmyradytes; Huttenlocker et al., 2007

Type species
- †Plemmyradytes shintoni Huttenlocker et al., 2007

Extinct genus of amphibians

Plemmyradytes is an extinct genus of dissorophoid temnospondyl from the early Permian (early Asselian stage). It is an amphibamiform from the Eskridge Formation exposures of Nebraska. The type species is Plemmyradytes shintoni. The genus name derives from the Greek plemmyris ('tide' or 'wave') and dytes ('diver'), while the specific name honors John Shinton, a fossil preparator at the Denver Museum of Natural History where all known specimens of this taxon are reposited following collection in the late 20th century.

== Anatomy ==
Huttenlocker et al. (2007) differentiated Plemmyradytes from other amphibamiforms by: (1) the reduced lateral exposure of the palatine (LEP); (2) a long and narrow supratemporal without a ventral flange; (3) a posteriorly extensive squamosal, long and slightly recurved teeth that decrease in size posteriorly; (4) a shallow dentary with a trough below the tooth row; and (5) smaller teeth on the dentary relative to the maxilla.

== Phylogeny ==
The phylogenetic relationships of Plemmyradytes are variably recovered by different authors. Huttenlocker et al. (2007) found P. shintoni to be the sister taxon of the micropholid Micropholis stowi. Similar results were obtained by Bourget & Anderson (2011) when the character coding was left unchanged. Conversely, updated character coding resulted in P. shintoni being recovered as the sister taxon to Eoscopus. Similarly, Fröbisch & Reisz (2008) recovered P. shintoni as being closer to amphibamids proper (Doleserpeton + Amphibamus) between the Carboniferous amphibamiforms Eoscopus from Kansas and Platyrhinops from Ohio. Subsequent analysis with increased taxon sampling using the same matrix by Maddin et al. (2013) recovered the same results.

Cladogram after Huttenlocker et al. (2007):

- Amphibamiformes
  - - Eoscopus
    - - 'Tersomius' mosesi
      - - 'Tersomius' sp.
        - - Micropholis
          - Plemmyradytes
  - - Platyrhinops
    - - Amphibamus
      - Doleserpeton

Cladogram after Fröbisch and Reisz (2008):

- Amphibamiformes
  - - Georgenthalia
    - - Eoscopus
      - - Plemmyradytes
        - - Platyrhinops
          - - Doleserpeton
            - - Gerobatrachus
              - Amphibamus
  - - Tersomius
    - - Micropholis
      - Pasawioops
