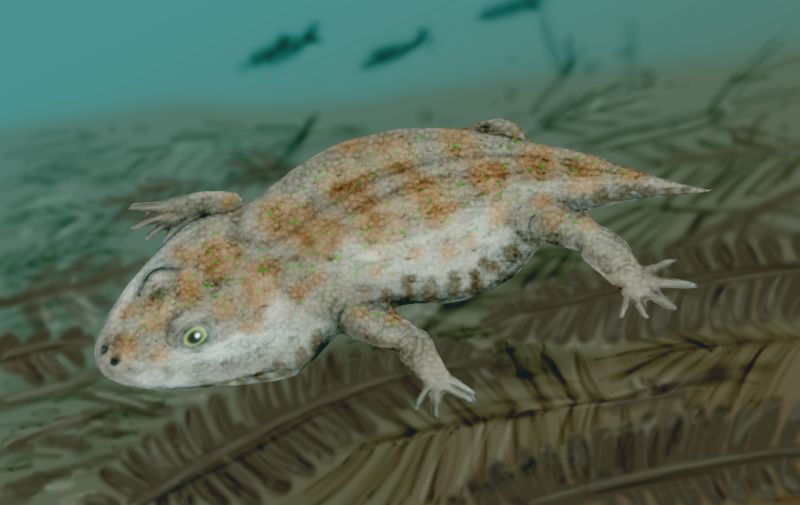
- Amphibamus grandiceps

Scientific classification
- Kingdom: Animalia
- Phylum: Chordata
- Clade: Tetrapoda
- Order: †Temnospondyli
- Superfamily: †Dissorophoidea
- Clade: †Amphibamiformes; Schoch, 2018

Subgroups
- Eoscopus; Georgenthalia; Gerobatrachus; Jeanerpeton; Kermitops; Nanobamus; Platyrhinops; Plemmyradytes; Rubeostratilia; Amphibamidae; Amphibamus; Doleserpeton; Micropholidae; Micropholis; Pasawioops; Tersomius; Branchiosauridae; Lissamphibia?

= Amphibamiformes =

Amphibamiformes Temporal range: Carboniferous–Triassic Probable descendant taxon Lissamphibia survives to present

Extinct clade of temnospondyls

Amphibamiformes is an unranked clade with Dissorophoidea created by Schoch (2018). It encompasses all of the taxa traditionally considered to be "amphibamids" (subsequently restricted to Doleserpeton annectens and Amphibamus grandiceps by Schoch), branchiosaurids, and hypothetically lissamphibians under the traditional temnospondyl hypothesis of lissamphibian origins. These taxa are typically small-bodied dissorophoids and form the sister group to Olsoniformes, which comprises dissorophids and trematopids.

== Description ==
Amphibamiformes are diagnosed by a palatine and ectopterygoid reduced to narrow struts, a laterally-expanded interpterygoid vacuity, a humerus length-to-waist ratio of 6:10, and an absent basioccipital and supraoccipital.

== Definition ==
A node-based clade; the most inclusive clade containing Amphibamus grandiceps but not Dissorophus multicinctus.

== Phylogeny ==
Holotype of Jeanerpeton mazonensis, including a soft tissue body outline

Simplified phylogeny of Dissorophoidea from Schoch (2018):

- Xerodromes
  - Olsoniformes
  - Amphibamiformes
    - Eoscopus
    - - Platyrhinops
      - - Micropholidae
          - Tersomius
          - - - Pasawioops
              - Micropholis
        - - Amphibamidae
            - Doleserpeton
            - Amphibamus
          - - - - Gerobatrachus
                - Georgenthalia
              - - Lissamphibia
                  - Eocaecilia
                  - - Karaurus
                    - Triadobatrachus
            - Branchiosauridae
              - Branchiosaurus
              - Apateon
              - - Leptorophus
                - Schoenfelderpeton

The phylogeny of Amphibamiformes has historically been relatively unresolved. Below are earlier analyses that recover slightly different topologies (nomenclature adjusted to reflect current status and ranks):

=== Fröbisch & Reisz (2008) ===
- Amphibamiformes
  - - Georgenthalia
    - - Eoscopus
      - - Plemmyradytes
        - - Platyrhinops
          - - Doleserpeton
            - - Gerobatrachus
              - Amphibamus
  - - Tersomius
    - - Micropholis
      - Pasawioops

=== Anderson et al. (2008) ===
- Amphibamiformes
  - - Tersomius
    - Micropholis
  - - Eoscopus
    - - Platyrhinops
      - - Amphibamus
        - - Doleserpeton
          - - Gerobatrachus
            - Batrachia
              - - Anura
                - Triadobatrachus
              - - Caudata
                - Albanerpetontidae

== Gallery ==
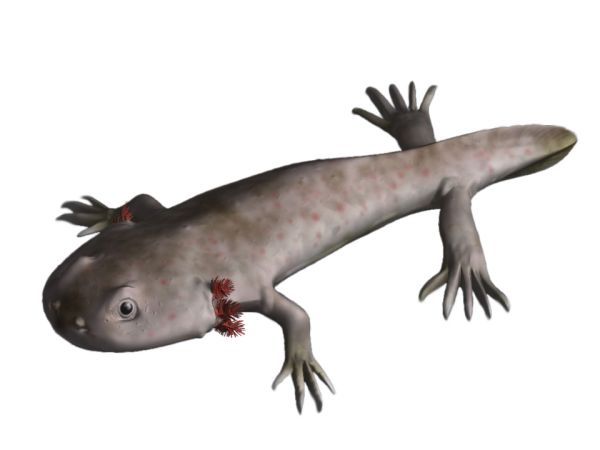
Branchiosaurus, a branchiosaurid of the late Carboniferous of central Europe

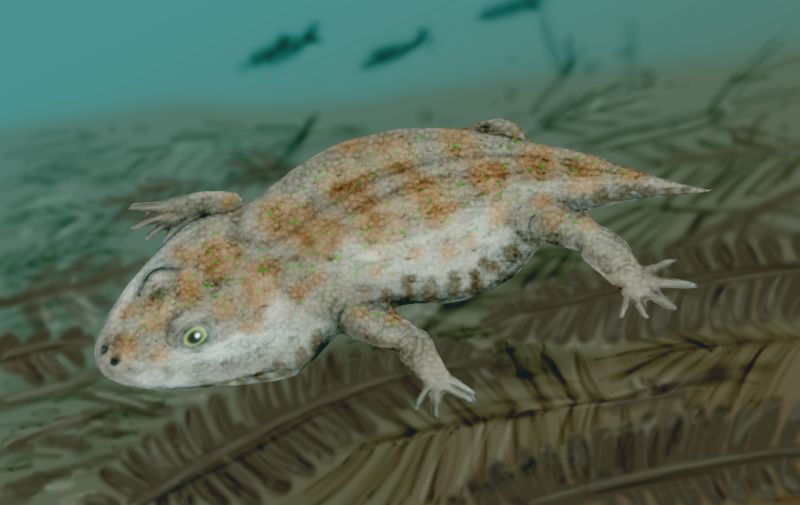
Amphibamus grandiceps, an amphibamid of the late Carboniferous of Illinois

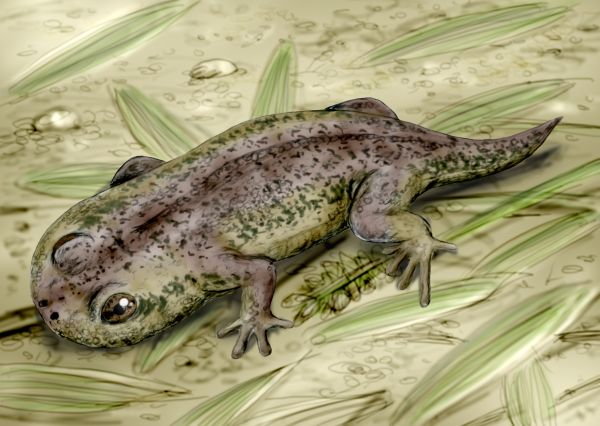
Gerobatrachus hottoni, of the early Permian of Texas; this may be a close relative of present-day amphibians

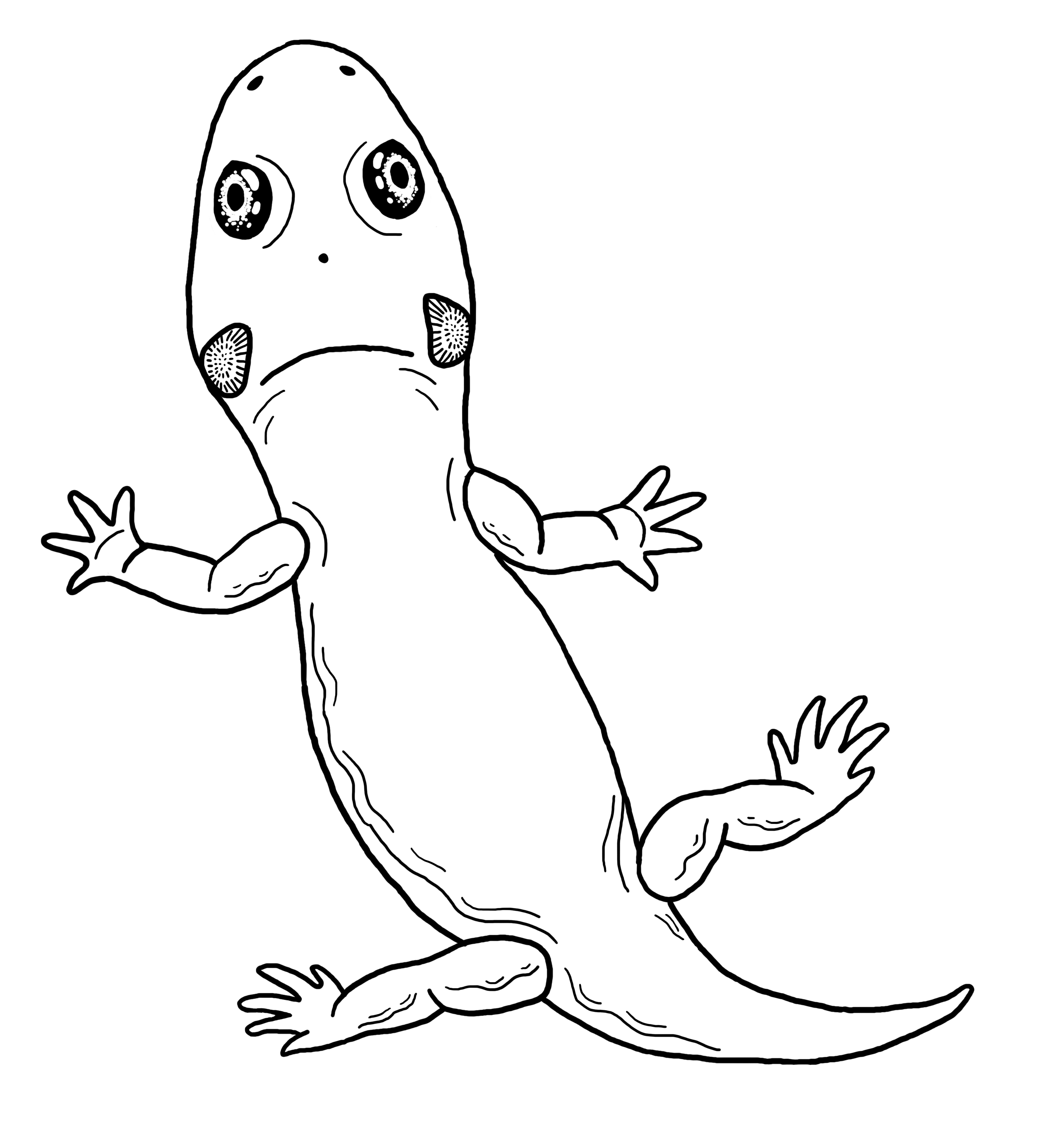
Rubeostratilia texensis, of the early Permian of Texas, an amphibamiform of uncertain relations

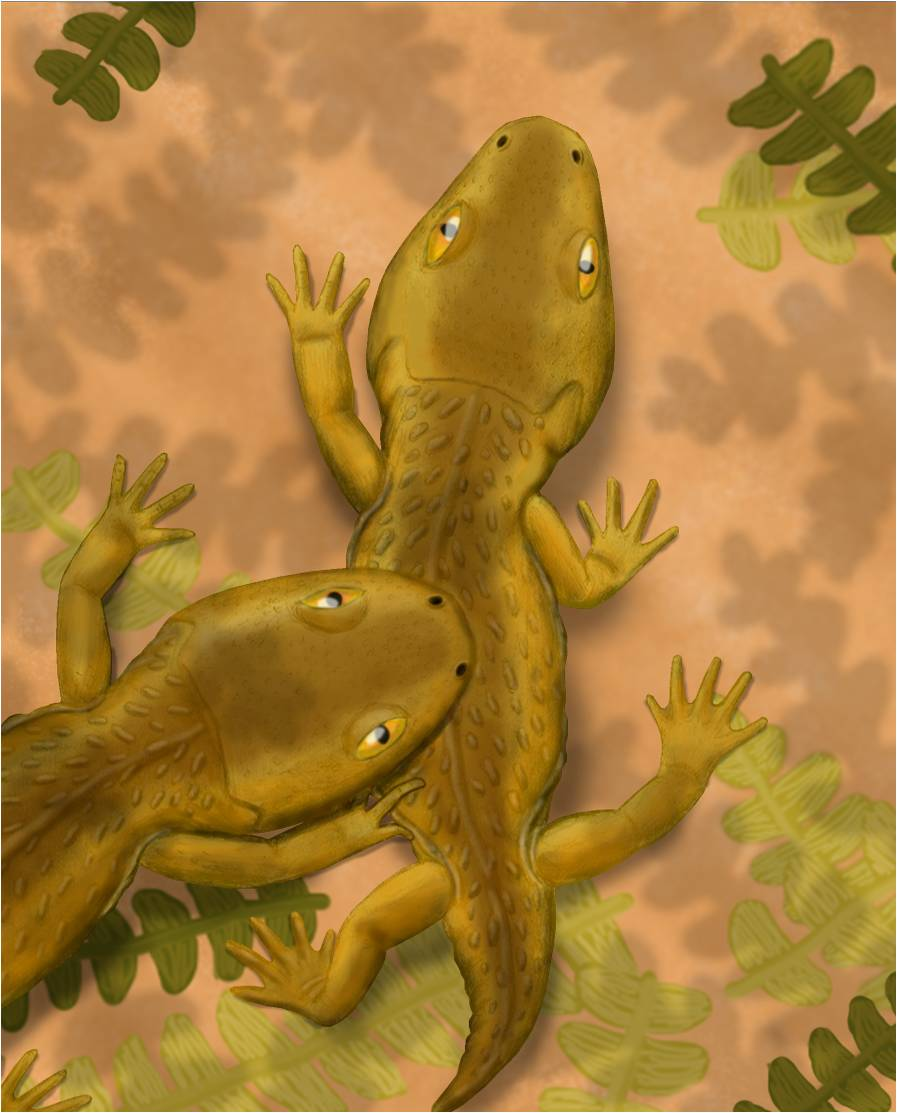
Micropholis stowi, a micropholid of the early Triassic of South Africa and Antarctica
