= Georgenthalia =

Georgenthalia Temporal range: Early Permian
- Life restoration

Scientific classification
- Kingdom: Animalia
- Phylum: Chordata
- Clade: Tetrapoda
- Order: †Temnospondyli
- Suborder: †Euskelia
- Superfamily: †Dissorophoidea
- Clade: †Amphibamiformes
- Genus: †Georgenthalia; Anderson et al., 2008

Species
- †G. clavinasica Anderson et al., 2008 (type)

Extinct genus of amphibians

Georgenthalia is an extinct genus of dissorophoid temnospondyl from the Lower Permian. It is an amphibamid which lived in what is now the Thuringian Forest of central Germany. It is known from the holotype MNG 11135, a small, complete skull. It was found in the Bromacker locality of the Tambach Formation. It was first named by Jason S. Anderson, Amy C. Henrici, Stuart S. Sumida, Thomas Martens and David S. Berman in 2008 and the type species is Georgenthalia clavinasica.

== Phylogeny ==
Cladogram after Fröbisch and Reisz, 2008:

- Amphibamidae
  - - Georgenthalia
    - - Eoscopus
      - - Plemmyradytes
        - - Platyrhinops
          - - Doleserpeton
            - - Gerobatrachus
              - Amphibamus
  - - Tersomius
    - - Micropholis
      - Pasawioops
