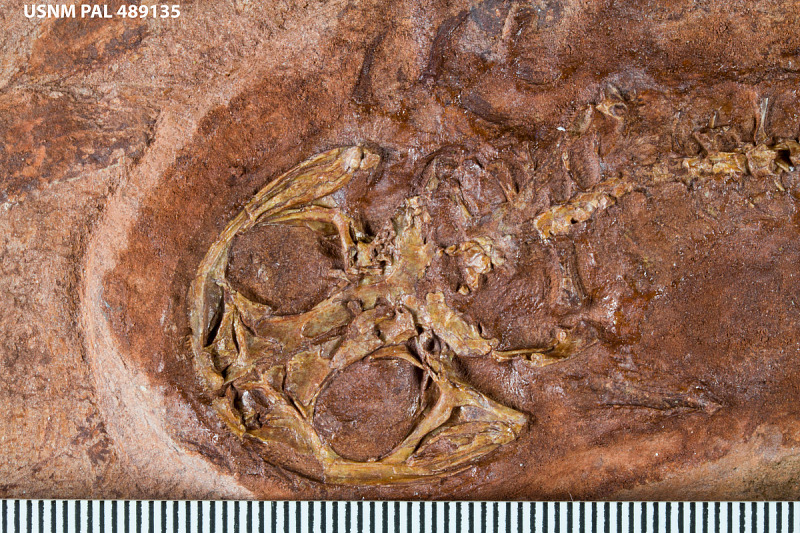
- Skull and anterior torso of the holotype

Scientific classification
- Kingdom: Animalia
- Phylum: Chordata
- Clade: Tetrapoda
- Order: †Temnospondyli
- Clade: †Amphibamiformes
- Genus: †Gerobatrachus; Anderson et al., 2008

Type species
- †Gerobatrachus hottoni Anderson et al., 2008

= Gerobatrachus =

Gerobatrachus Temporal range: Early Permian, 290 Ma

Extinct genus of amphibians

Gerobatrachus is an extinct genus of amphibamid temnospondyl (represented by the type species Gerobatrachus hottoni) that lived in the Early Permian, approximately 290 million years ago (Ma), in the area that is now Baylor County, Texas. When it was first described in 2008, Gerobatrachus was announced to be the closest relative of Batrachia, the group that includes modern frogs and salamanders. It possesses a mixture of characteristics from both groups, including a large frog-like head and a salamander-like tail. These features have led to it being dubbed a frogamander by the press. Some more recent studies place Gerobatrachus as the closest relative of Lissamphibia, the group that contains all modern amphibians including frogs, salamanders, and caecilians, or place modern amphibians far from Gerobatrachus within a group called Lepospondyli.

== Discovery ==
Gerobatrachus hottoni was described for the first time on May 22, 2008 in the journal Nature. The nearly complete holotype skeleton USNM 489135 was collected from a fossil locality known as Don's Dump Fish Quarry in Baylor County, Texas in 1995. It was then rediscovered in the collections of the National Museum of Natural History, Washington, D.C., in 2004. The genus name means "elder frog" in Greek, from γέρος (géros, "elder") and βάτραχος (batrakhos, "frog"). The species name honors Nicholas Hotton III, a paleontologist who had worked for the National Museum of Natural History.

== Description ==
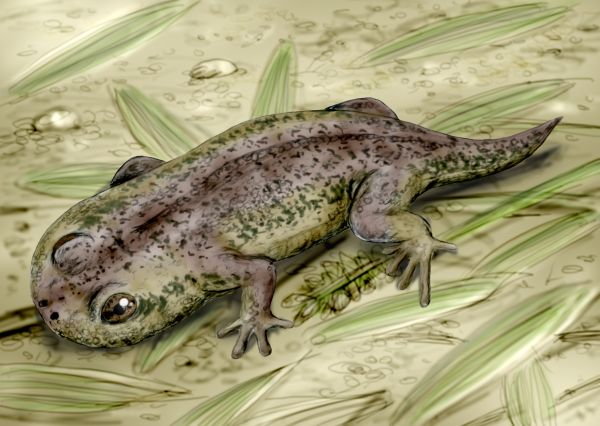
Life restoration

The only known specimen of Gerobatrachus is a nearly complete skeleton (USNM 489135) about 11 centimetres (4.3 in) long, that is articulated, preserved in ventral view, missing only the stylopodia, zeugopodia, and ventral portions of the skull and pectoral girdle. It is preserved in red siltstone with only its underside exposed. Like other amphibolid temnospondyls, Gerobatrachus has a rounded and flattened head, well-developed limbs, and a small tail. Its vertebral column is somewhat shorter than those of related amphibolids. The large, round head and shortened vertebral column are features Gerobatrachus shares in common with frogs and the early salamander Karaurus. Gerobatrachus also has a large embayment at the back of the skull called an optic notch, which is seen other amphibolids and in frogs and supports the tympanum, an eardrum-like structure used in hearing.

Many finer details of the skull link Gerobatrachus with modern amphibians. Gerobatrachus has a row of very small pedicellate teeth, a feature shared with modern amphibians. Pedicellate teeth are characterized by two layers of hardened dentine, one at the tooth base and one at the tooth tip, surrounding a middle layer of softer, uncalcified dentine. The palate, which in other amphibians bears many distinguishing characteristics, is poorly preserved in Gerobatrachus. The preserved portion lacks the large palatal teeth commonly found in other temnospondyls. The vomer bone is much shorter in length than it is in other amphibamids, but similar in proportion to living amphibians. As in most frogs, the palatine bone forms a narrow strip along the side of the palate. Gerobatrachus possesses another modern amphibian characteristic at the back of the skull, a widened bone called the parasphenoid basal plate. Many of the features that link Gerobatrachus with modern amphibians are also seen in other amphibamids. For example, the amphibamids Amphibamus, Doleserpeton, Eoscopus, and Platyrhinops also have large otic notches; Amphibamus, Doleserpeton, and Tersomius also have pedicellate teeth; and Amphibamus and Doleserpeton also have a wide parasphenoid plate.

== Classification ==
When Gerobatrachus was first described in 2008, it was incorporated into a phylogenetic analysis that found it to be the sister taxon or closest relative of Batrachia, an evolutionary group that includes living frogs and salamanders but not caecilians, which are the third major lineage of modern amphibians (the three main groups of modern amphibians are collectively known as lissamphibians). As was the case in some previous analyses, caecilians were found to be the descendants of a group of small amphibious Paleozoic tetrapods called Lepospondyli while frogs and salamanders had an independent origin within Temnospondyli. The phylogeny supported by the 2008 analysis has been called the "polyphyletic hypothesis" and is one of three main hypotheses for lissamphibian origins. The other two hypotheses are the "lepospondyl hypothesis", which places all lissamphibians as the closest relatives of a group of lepospondyls called lysorophians, and the "temnospondyl hypothesis", which has all lissamphibians derived from amphibamid temnospondyls like Gerobatrachus. Paleontologists David Marjanović and Michel Laurin published studies in 2008 and 2009 that supported the lepospondyl hypothesis. Their phylogenetic analyses confirmed that Gerobatrachus was an amphibamid temnospondyl, and since all modern amphibians nested within Lepospondyli, it was positioned far from the ancestry of frogs and salamanders. A 2012 study of the stem-caecilian Eocaecilia found Gerobatrachus to group within Lissamphibia. In this phylogeny, Gerobatrachus is more closely related to frogs and salamanders than it is to caecilians, meaning that Gerobatrachus would have been a descendant of the last common ancestor of modern amphibians.

Below is a cladogram from the original 2008 phylogenetic analysis (left) and a cladogram from the 2012 analysis (right):

- Tetrapoda
  - Acanthostega
  - - - Proterogyrinus
      - - Seymouria baylorensis
        - - Limnoscelis
          - Lepospondyli (including caecilians)
    - Temnospondyli
      - Greererpeton
      - - Eryops
        - - Balanerpeton
          - Dendrerpeton
        - - - Tambachia
            - - Ecolsonia
              - Acheloma
          - - - Branchiosauridae
              - Micromelerpetontidae
            - - - Tersomius
                - Micropholis
              - - Eoscopus
                - - Platyrhinops
                  - - Amphibamus
                    - - Doleserpeton
                      - - Gerobatrachus
                        - Batrachia
                          - - Triadobatrachus
                            - Anura (frogs)
                          - - Albanerpetontidae
                            - Caudata (salamanders)

- Tetrapoda
  - Acanthostega
  - - - Proterogyrinus
      - - Seymouria baylorensis
        - - Limnoscelis
          - Lepospondyli
    - Temnospondyli
      - Greererpeton
      - - Eryops
        - - - Balanerpeton
            - Dendrerpeton
          - - - Tambachia
              - - Ecolsonia
                - Acheloma
            - - - Branchiosauridae
                - Micromelerpetontidae
              - - - Tersomius
                  - Micropholis
                - - Eoscopus
                  - - Platyrhinops
                    - - Amphibamus
                      - - Doleserpeton
                        - Lissamphibia
                          - - Gerobatrachus
                            - Batrachia
                          - Gymnophiona
                            - Eocaecilia
                            - Apoda (caecilians)
