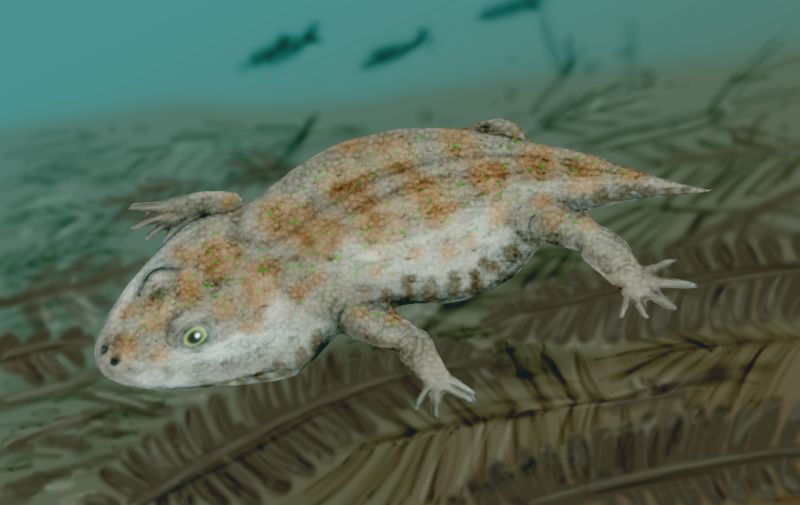
- Amphibamus grandiceps

Scientific classification
- Kingdom: Animalia
- Phylum: Chordata
- Clade: Tetrapoda
- Order: †Temnospondyli
- Clade: †Amphibamiformes
- Family: †Amphibamidae; Moodie, 1909

Subgroups
- See text.

Synonyms
- Doleserpetontidae Bolt, 1969; Peliontidae Cope, MS

= Amphibamidae =

Amphibamidae Temporal range: Late Carboniferous–Early Permian, 311.45–289 Ma Possible descendant taxon Lissamphibia survives to present.

Extinct family of temnospondyls

The Amphibamidae are an ancient family of dissorophoid temnospondyls known from Late Carboniferous-Early Permian strata in the United States.

== Classification ==
Amphibamidae has traditionally included small-bodied, terrestrial dissorophoids. The name is attributed to Moodie (1909), but it was rarely used because it originally referred only to Amphibamus. Similar monogeneric families were also erected for other small, terrestrial dissorophoids (e.g., Doleserpetontidae), and most of the taxa now recognized as amphibamiforms were placed within the Dissorophidae.

Clack & Milner (1993) revived the Amphibamidae to include Amphibamus, Platyrhinops, Doleserpeton, and Tersomius. Daly (1994) further expanded the composition of the Amphibamidae to include the newly described Eoscopus as well as the Early Triassic form Micropholis. She suggested that the micromelerpetids were also amphibamids, which has not been validated by more recent workers. Subsequent phylogenetic work verified the monophyly of the Amphibamidae, with recent analyses also recovering the branchiosaurids nested within the amphibamids.

Schoch (2018) erected the new clade Amphibamiformes to include the traditional amphibamids and the nested branchiosaurids and subsequently restricted the Amphibamidae to two taxa: Doleserpeton annectens from the Dolese Brothers Limestone Quarry near Richards Spur, Oklahoma and Amphibamus grandiceps from Mazon Creek, Illinois. These taxa are united by several features, such as a medially expanded choana.

=== Phylogeny of amphibamiforms from Schoch (2018) ===
- Xerodromes
  - Olsoniformes
  - Amphibamiformes
    - Eoscopus
    - - Platyrhinops
      - - Micropholidae
          - Tersomius
          - - - Pasawioops
              - Micropholis
        - - Amphibamidae
            - Doleserpeton
            - Amphibamus
          - - - - Gerobatrachus
                - Georgenthalia
              - - Lissamphibia
                  - Eocaecilia
                  - - Karaurus
                    - Triadobatrachus
            - Branchiosauridae
              - Branchiosaurus
              - Apateon
              - - Leptorophus
                - Schoenfelderpeton

=== Relationship to the Batrachia ===
The Amphibamidae have typically been recovered close to some or all of the lissamphibian crown. Until the description of Gerobatrachus, Doleserpeton was considered to be the closest extinct relative to the crown group. Below is a modified cladogram from Anderson et al. (2008) showing Batrachia nested in the Amphibamidae, with Gerobatrachus as the sister taxon of Batrachia (anurans and caudates) and Doleserpeton and Amphibamus as successive outgroups:

- Amphibamidae
  - - Tersomius
    - Micropholis
  - - Eoscopus
    - - Platyrhinops
      - - Amphibamus
        - - Doleserpeton
          - - Gerobatrachus
            - Batrachia
              - - Anura
                - Triadobatrachus
              - - Caudata
                - Albanerpetontidae

There is continued debate over the origin of lissamphibians, including whether they are monophyletic or whether batrachians and caecilians are descended from different clades of tetrapods or temnospondyls. If they are monophyletic, there is also a debate about which clade they are nested in, with some hypotheses suggesting a lepospondyl origin, in which case amphibamids would not be closely related to any extant amphibians.
