= Micropholidae =

Micropholidae Temporal range: Late Carboniferous–Late Permian, 307.1–252 Ma Possible descendant taxon Lissamphibia survives to present.

Scientific classification
- Kingdom: Animalia
- Phylum: Chordata
- Clade: Tetrapoda
- Order: †Temnospondyli
- Suborder: †Euskelia
- Superfamily: †Dissorophoidea
- Clade: †Amphibamiformes
- Family: †Micropholidae; Watson, 1919

Genera
- Eoscopus?; Micropholis; Pasawioops; Plemmyradytes?; Rubeostratilia?; Tersomius

Extinct family of temnospondyls

The Micropholidae are an extinct family of dissorophoid temnospondyls known from Late Carboniferous to Early Triassic strata in the United States and South Africa.

== Systematics ==
Members of Micropholidae were historically included in Amphibamidae, but Schoch (2019) recovered Amphibamidae as paraphyletic, necessitating resurrection of Micropholidae for Micropholis and closely related taxa.
