= Nicholas Hotton III =

American paleontologist

Nicholas Hotton
- Born: January 28, 1921; Sault Ste. Marie, Michigan, U.S.
- Died: November 29, 1999 (aged 78); Takoma Park, Maryland, U.S.

Academic background
- Education: University of Chicago (BS, PhD)

Academic work
- Discipline: Paleontology
- Institutions: University of Kansas; Smithsonian Institution; George Washington University

Nicholas Hotton III (January 28, 1921 – November 29, 1999) was an American paleontologist renowned as an expert on dinosaurs and reptiles.

== Early life and education ==
Hotton was born in Sault Ste. Marie, Michigan and was educated at the University of Chicago, where he received his bachelor's degree in geology and a Ph.D. in paleozoology.

== Career ==
Hotton taught anatomy at the University of Kansas from 1951 to 1959, before joining the staff of the Smithsonian Institution in 1959, initially as an associate curator of vertebrate paleontology and later as the curator of vertebrate paleontology for the National Museum of Natural History. In addition to administering collections at the National Museum, Hotton taught a course in vertebrate paleontology at George Washington University. Much of his work focused on dicynodonts, a group of mammal-like reptiles that lived in the Permian and Triassic Periods. Hotton remained at the Smithsonian until his death aged 78, from colon cancer.

Hotton was the author of numerous technical papers and many other books regarding paleontology.

His more famous books include the widely praised Dinosaurs (1963) and The Evidence of Evolution (1968). A major paper on the physiology of dinosaurs was "An Alternative to Dinosaur Endothermy: The Happy Wanderers" in A Cold Look at the Warm Blooded Dinosaurs (D.K. Thomas and E.C. Olson. eds., 1980), in which he countered Bob Bakker's theory of endothermic, or "warm-blooded" dinosaurs with a theory that migration helped large cold-blooded dinosaurs maintain a constant body temperature.
