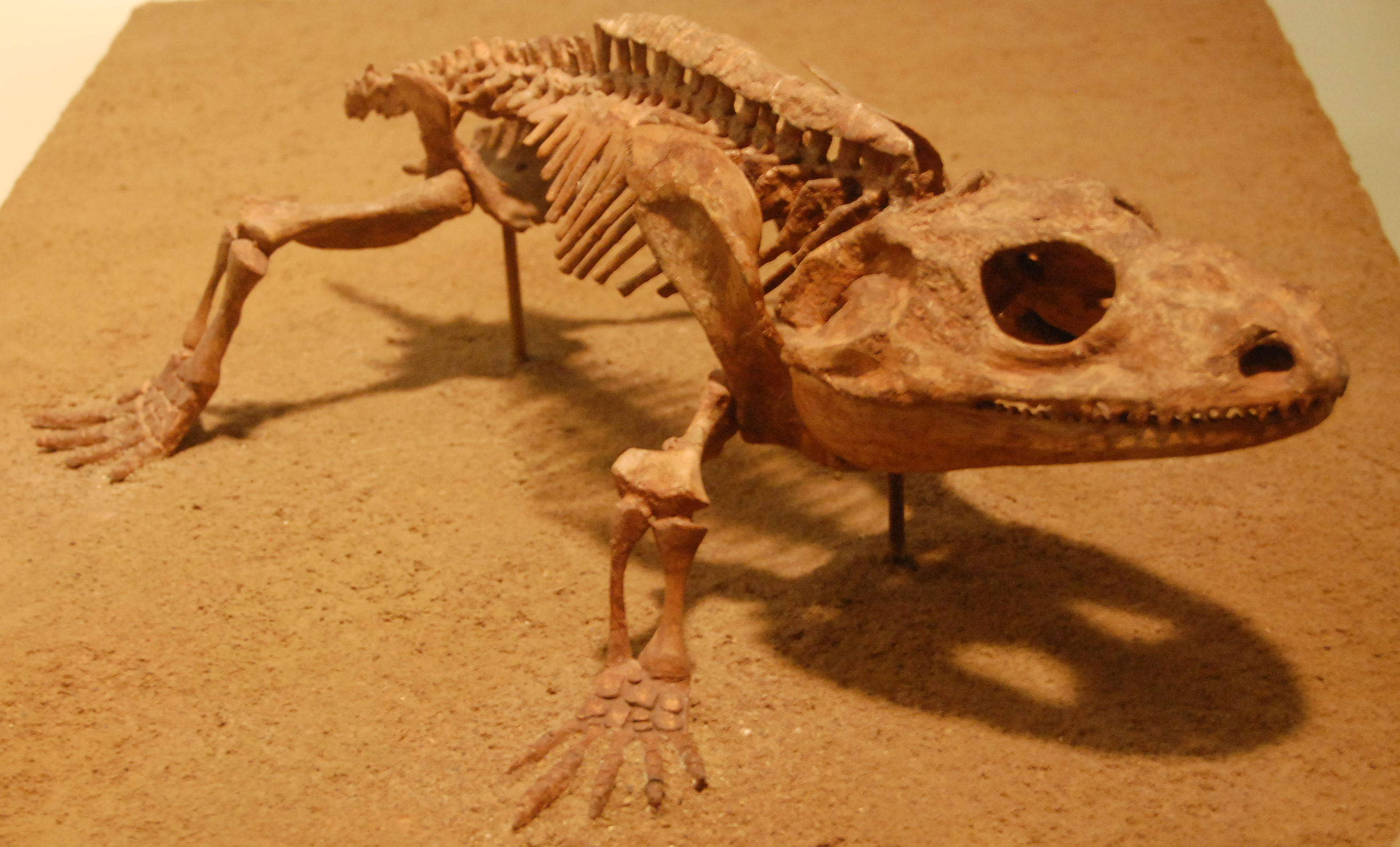
- Skeleton of Cacops aspidephorus (Dissorophidae) in the Field Museum

Scientific classification
- Kingdom: Animalia
- Phylum: Chordata
- Clade: Tetrapoda
- Order: †Temnospondyli
- Suborder: †Euskelia
- Superfamily: †Dissorophoidea; Bolt, 1969

Subgroups
- See text.

= Dissorophoidea =

Dissorophoidea Temporal range: Late Carboniferous - Early Triassic, 307.1–249 Ma Probable descendant taxon Lissamphibia survives to present.

Extinct superfamily of amphibians

Dissorophoidea is a clade of medium-sized, temnospondyl amphibians that appeared during the Moscovian in Euramerica, and continued through to the Late Permian and the Early Triassic of Gondwana. They are distinguished by various details of the skull, and many species seem to have been well adapted for life on land.

Dissorophoid diversity was highest in the Permian; some of the more diverse families within the group include Dissorophidae (toad-like amphibians with armored scutes along their backbone), Trematopidae (terrestrial predators with large triangular skulls), and Branchiosauridae (small neotenic amphibians with large external gills). The small Permo-Carboniferous Micromelerpetontidae are another example of neotenic dissorophoids. Many small dissorophoids with short rounded skulls were historically known as "amphibamids"; in 2018, the name Amphibamiformes was erected for a clade equivalent to the broad historical definition of "Amphibamidae".

Since 2008, a consensus of early amphibian researchers consider Lissamphibia (modern amphibians) to be part of this clade. There is a large degree of similarity between lissamphibians (for which the oldest known fossils are Early Triassic) and certain Early Permian amphibamiforms, such as Gerobatrachus and Doleserpeton. A few authors still dispute affinities between dissorophoids and lissamphibians.

== Taxonomy ==
- †Micromelerpetontidae
- Xerodromes
  - †Olsoniformes
    - †Dissorophidae
    - †Trematopidae
  - Amphibamiformes
    - †Amphibamidae
    - †Branchiosauridae
    - †Micropholidae
    - †Eoscopus
    - †Georgenthalia
    - †Gerobatrachus
    - †Nanobamus
    - †Platyrhinops
    - †Plemmyradytes
    - †Rubeostratilia
    - Lissamphibia (according to the consensus position)
      - †Allocaudata / †Albanerpetontidae
      - Gymnophiona (total group of caecilians)
      - Batrachia
        - Salientia (total group of frogs)
        - Caudata (total group of salamanders)

== Phylogeny ==
An extensive phylogenetic analysis of dissorophoids conducted in 2016 and 2018 found that the families Dissorophidae and Trematopidae are more closely related to each other than either is to the family Amphibamidae. Following a 2008 study, the Dissorophidae-Trematopidae clade was called Olsoniformes. Below is the cladogram from the 2018 analysis:

- Dissorophoidea
  - †Micromelerpetontidae
  - Xerodromes
    - †Olsoniformes
      - Trematopidae
      - Dissorophidae
    - Amphibamiformes
      - - †Platyrhinops
        - †Eoscopus
      - - †Micropholidae
        - - †Amphibamidae
          - - †Branchiosauridae
            - - †Gerobatrachus
              - Lissamphibia
