= Pasawioops =

Pasawioops Temporal range: Early Permian, 275 Ma

Scientific classification
- Domain: Eukaryota
- Kingdom: Animalia
- Phylum: Chordata
- Order: †Temnospondyli
- Family: †Amphibamidae
- Genus: †Pasawioops; Fröbisch & Reisz, 2008

Type species
- †Pasawioops mayi Fröbisch & Reisz, 2008

Extinct genus of amphibians

Pasawioops is an extinct genus of early Permian dissorophoid temnospondyl within the clade Amphibamiformes.

== History of study ==
Pasawioops was first described from the early Permian fissure fills near Richards Spur in Comanche County, Oklahoma. It is known from three skulls from this locality. The holotype is a complete skull (reposited at the Sam Noble Oklahoma Museum of Natural History [OMNH]), while the referred specimens are larger but more incomplete partial skulls (one at the OMNH and the other at the Field Museum). The taxon is also known from one specimen from the early Permian of Texas (reposited at the Museum of Comparative Zoology), being previously misidentified as a specimen of Tersomius texensis.

== Anatomy ==
Pasawioops has a relatively long and slender skull for an amphibamiform, with the posterior skull table not abbreviated as in more derived taxa. A tooth-bearing crest is found along the cultriform process, and the pterygoid bears two ridges of teeth. The teeth of Pasawioops are monocuspid and recurved. Unlike some derived amphibamiforms such as Gerobatrachus, the teeth are not pedicellate, or narrow at the base.

== Relationships ==
Pasawioops has long been recognized to be closely related to Micropholis from South Africa and Tersomius from North America. This clade was formalized by Schoch (2018) as the family Micropholidae.
