= Nanobamus =

Nanobamus Temporal range: Early Permian

Scientific classification
- Kingdom: Animalia
- Phylum: Chordata
- Clade: Tetrapoda
- Order: †Temnospondyli
- Clade: †Amphibamiformes
- Genus: †Nanobamus; Schoch and Milner, 2014

Type species
- †Nanobamus macrorhinus Schoch and Milner, 2014

Extinct genus of amphibians

Nanobamus is an extinct genus of amphibamiform temnospondyl amphibian. The type species is Nanobamus macrorhinus. The type specimen is UCLA VP 3686, a skull recovered from the Lower Permian Arroyo Formation (Texas, United States).

== History of study ==
UCLA VP 3686 was originally described by Olson (1985) as a larval "trematopsid" (now called 'trematopids'). Much of this referral was based on the elongate external naris, a feature that is well known in derived trematopids such as Acheloma, although the feature is not exclusive to trematopids or universally found in all trematopids. This identification was challenged by Dilkes (1991), who noted that the construction of the naris was different from that of trematopids, implying convergence on this feature. Dilkes argued that while the specimen was clearly a dissorophoid, it could not be referred to a particular dissorophoid family. Schoch (2002) briefly noted that the specimen was "clearly an amphibamid ['amphibamiform' in the current framework]." The specimen was formally recognized as the type specimen of a new amphibamiform genus and species, Nanobamus macrorhinus, by Schoch & Milner (2014). Per Schoch & Milner, the generic epithet derives from the Greek nanos ("dwarf") and bamos ("walker"), and the species epithet derives from the Greek makros ("long"/"large") and rhinos ("nose").

== Anatomy ==
Schoch & Milner (2014) list six characters in their diagnosis of N. macrorhinus: (1) naris extending posterior to the septomaxilla, with the shape of a sideways '8'; (2) narrow interorbital distance; (3) large postfrontal; (4) frontal twice as wide anteriorly as it is posteriorly; (5) large denticle field extending onto the base of the cultriform process; (6) slender basipterygoid process of the pterygoid extending onto the basal plate of the parasphenoid.
