= Pedicellate teeth =

Pedicellate teeth are a tooth morphology today unique to modern amphibians, but also seen in a variety of extinct labyrinthodonts. Pedicellate teeth consist of a tooth crown and a base (both composed of dentine) separated by a layer of uncalcified dentine.

Pedicellate teeth fossilize better than the rest of the body, these teeth are found in Stem amphibians. The synapomorphy of modern amphibian groups is proven through the shared fossil record.
