= Schoenfelderpeton =

Scientific classification
- Domain: Eukaryota
- Kingdom: Animalia
- Phylum: Chordata
- Order: †Temnospondyli
- Family: †Branchiosauridae
- Subfamily: †Branchiosaurinae
- Genus: †Schoenfelderpeton; Boy, 1986

Type species
- Schoenfelderpeton prescheri

Extinct genus of temnospondyls

Schoenfelderpeton is an extinct genus of branchiosaurid temnospondyls. It is a sister taxon to Leptorophus tener.
