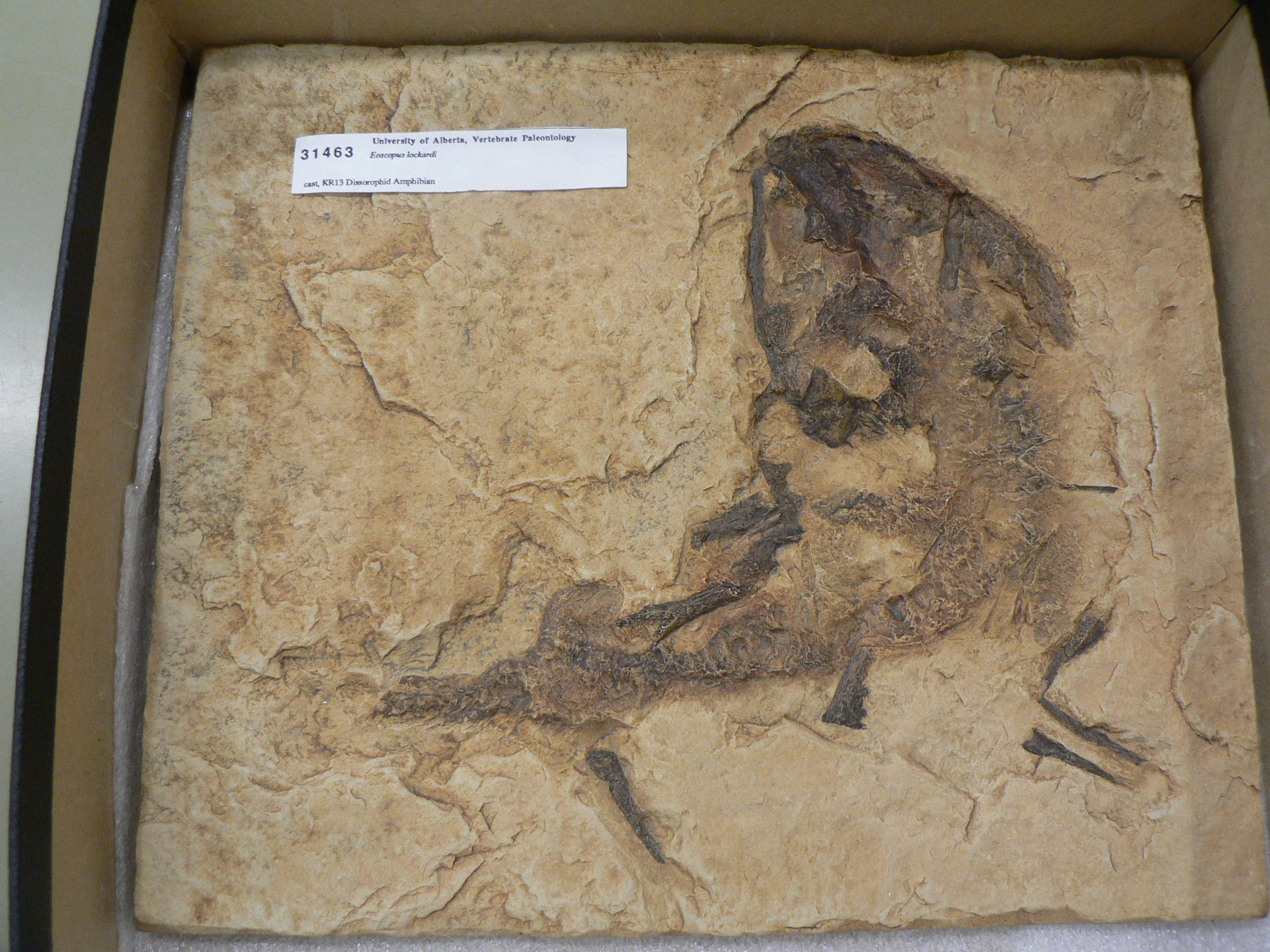

Scientific classification
- Kingdom: Animalia
- Phylum: Chordata
- Clade: Tetrapoda
- Order: †Temnospondyli
- Genus: †Eoscopus; Daly, 1994
- Species: †E. lockardi

Binomial name
- †Eoscopus lockardi Daly, 1994

= Eoscopus =

Eoscopus Temporal range: Carboniferous - Permian 303.4–295 Ma

Extinct genus of amphibians

Eoscopus is an extinct monospecific genus of amphibamiform temnospondyl that is probably in the dissorophoid family Micropholidae. It is known from Hamilton Quarry, a Pennsylvanian lagerstätte near Hamilton, Kansas.

== History of study ==
Eoscopus was formally described for the type and only species, E. lockardi, by Daly (1994) based on material from the Hamilton Quarry. The generic epithet derives from the Greek eo ("dawn") and skopos ("watcher"), and the species epithet honors Walter Lockard, who discovered the first vertebrate fossil at the site.

== Anatomy ==
Eoscopus lockardi is known from more than two dozen specimens, many of which comprise partial to complete skeletons. Daly diagnosed it as having (1) a relatively narrow interorbital region; (2) eight pairs of shoulder ribs beginning from the axis, with the first five being more robust; (3) a single pair of spatulate sacral ribs; (4) deep contact between the two halves of the pelvis for their anterior two-thirds; and (5) knobbed terminal phalanges. Schoch & Milner (2014) retained some of these features in their revised diagnosis, which includes: (1) narrow interorbital region and large orbits; (2) dense mosaic of palpebral ossicles; (3) narrow distance between otic notch and orbit; (4) frontal entering the orbit; (5) large pleurocentra that nearly meet ventrally; (5) a relatively long skull table; and (7) a palatine-pterygoid contact. Compared to many other amphibamiforms, especially non-branchiosaurids, essentially the entire skeleton is known.

== Phylogenetic relationships ==
Daly (1994), following on previous conjecture, separated several taxa historically placed in Dissorophidae into Amphibamidae, including Amphibamus, Doleserpeton, Eoscopus, and Tersomius. Significant work on this group of small-bodied dissorophoids has led to further nomenclatural changes such that Amphibamidae is now restricted to Amphibamus, Doleserpeton, and Platyrhinops. Eoscopus is typically recovered within or near the Micropholidae, another family within the larger Amphibamiformes, although other results have been found.

There has been some speculation that multiple taxa are represented in the set of material assigned to E. lockardi.

== See also ==
- Prehistoric amphibian
- List of prehistoric amphibians
