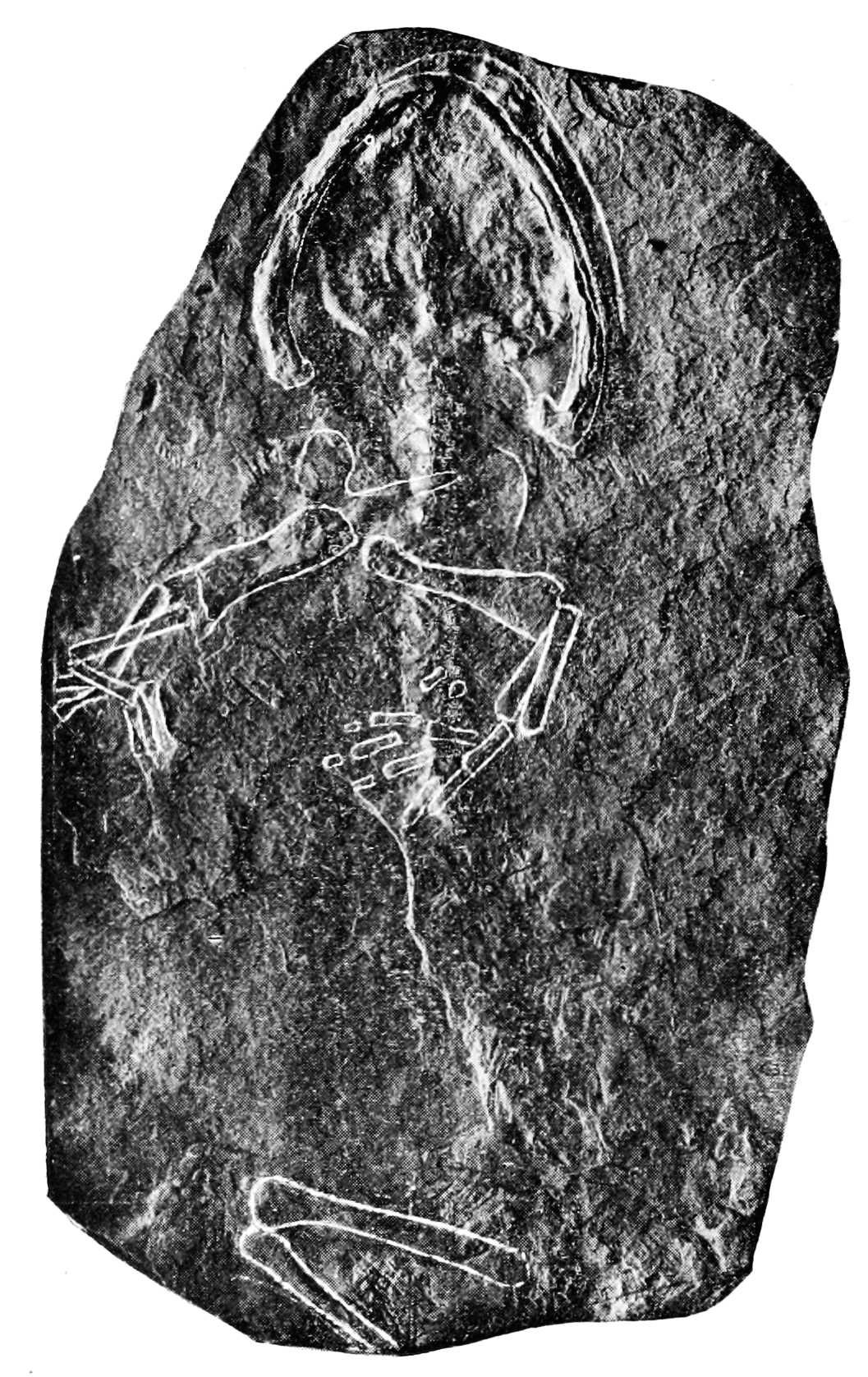
- Holotype of platyrhinops lyelli with bones outlined in white

Scientific classification
- Domain: Eukaryota
- Kingdom: Animalia
- Phylum: Chordata
- Order: †Temnospondyli
- Clade: †Amphibamiformes
- Genus: †Platyrhinops; Steen, 1931
- Species: †P. lyelli

Binomial name
- †Platyrhinops lyelli Wyman, 1858 (as Raniceps lyelli)

Synonyms
- Raniceps lyelli Wyman, 1858 [preoccupied] Pelion lyelli Wyman in Cope, 1868; Tuditanus mordax Cope, 1874; Pelion lyellii Cope, 1875; Ichthycanthus platypus Cope, 1877; Eryops platypus Cope, 1888; Diceratosaurus punctolineatus Moodie, 1909 ?Leptophractus lancifer Romer, 1930; Platyrhinops mordax Steen, 1931; Amphibamus lyelli Bolt, 1979

= Platyrhinops =

Platyrhinops Temporal range: Late Carboniferous, 307.1–305 Ma

Extinct genus of amphibians

Platyrhinops is an extinct genus amphibamid temnospondyl from the Late Carboniferous (late Westphalian stage) of Ohio and the Czech Republic. It is known from many partial skeletons from the Linton site in Saline Township, Ohio and at least 6 partial specimens from the Nýřany site from the Nýřany Member of the Kladno Formation in the Czech Republic.

== Gallery ==
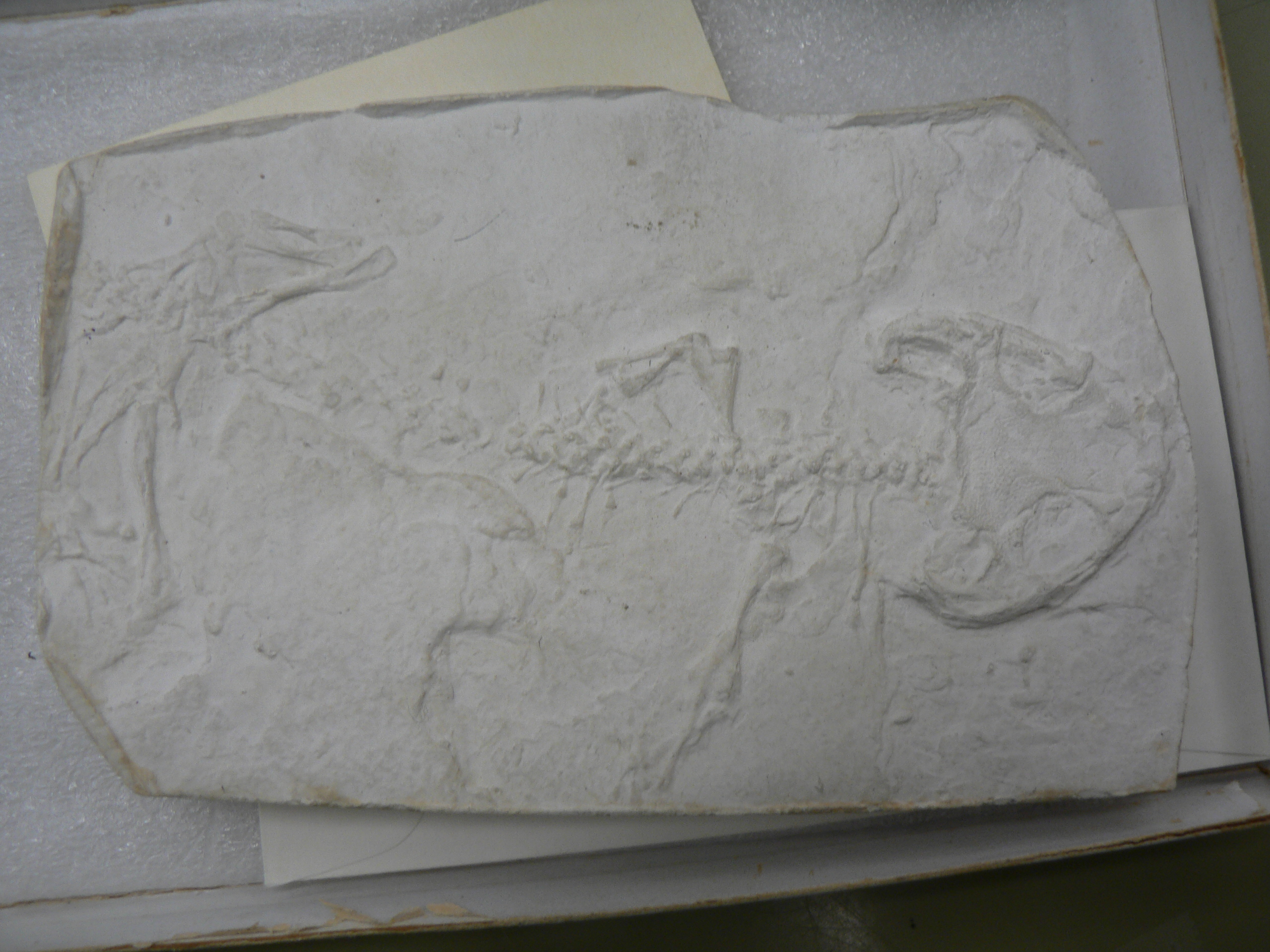
Cast of holotype at UALVP.

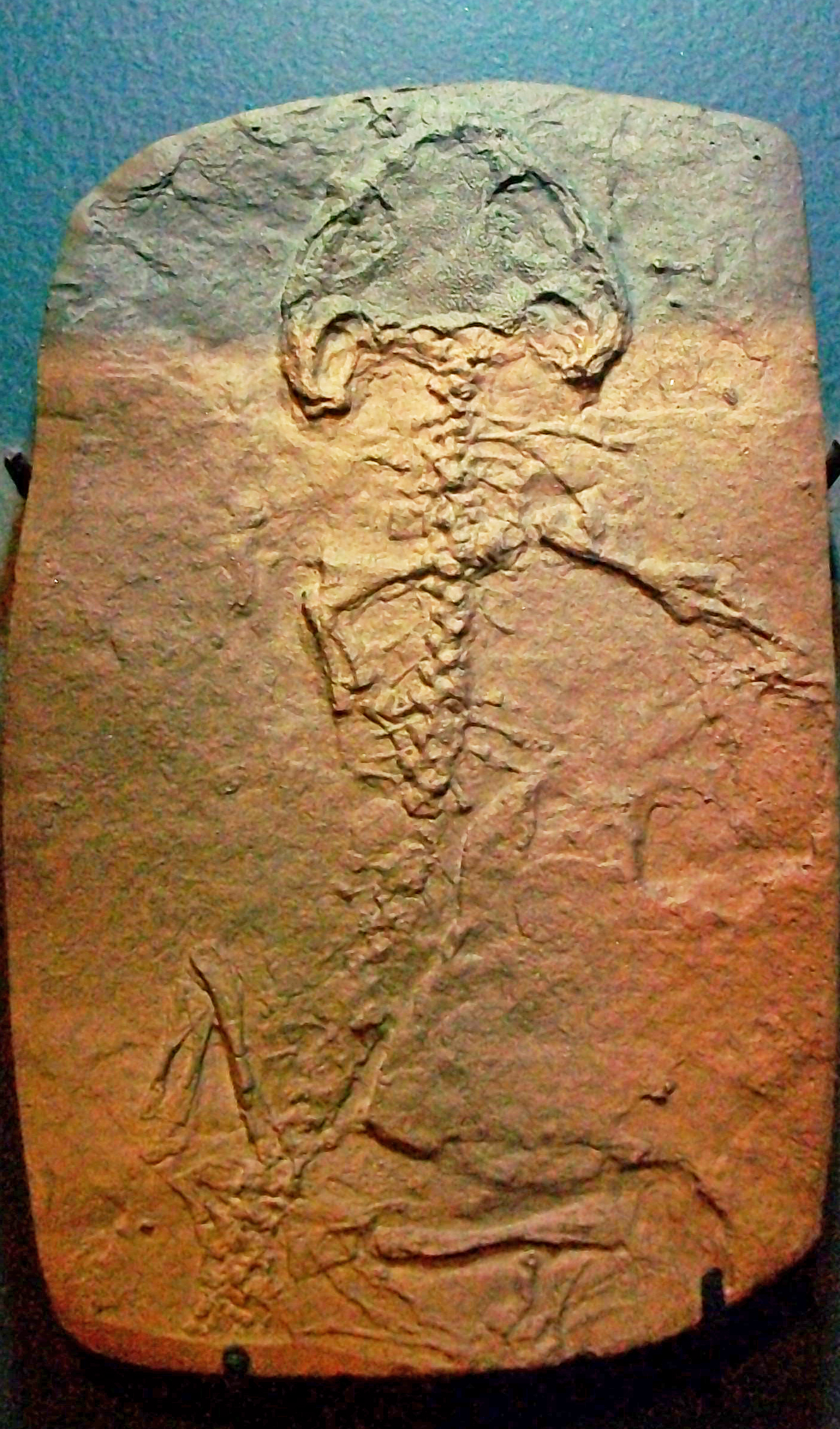
Cast of holotype in the Field Museum of Natural History

== See also ==
- Prehistoric amphibian
- List of prehistoric amphibians
