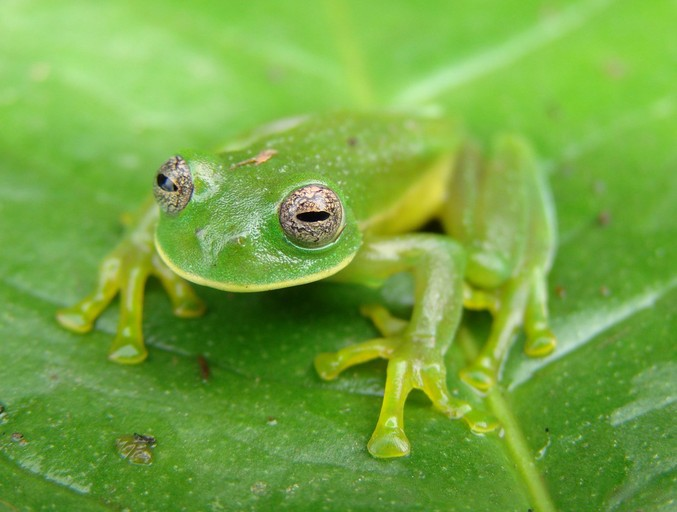
- Emerald glass frog (Centrolene prosoblepon)

Scientific classification
- Kingdom: Animalia
- Phylum: Chordata
- Class: Amphibia
- Subclass: Lissamphibia; Haeckel, 1866

Subgroups
- †Allocaudata; Batrachia; Gymnophiona

= Lissamphibia =

Lissamphibia Temporal range: Early Triassic – Present (Possible Cisuralian record)

Subclass of amphibians

The Lissamphibia (from Greek λισσός (lissós, "smooth") + ἀμφίβια (amphíbia), meaning "smooth amphibians") is a group of tetrapods that includes all modern amphibians. Lissamphibians consist of three living groups: the Salientia (frogs and their extinct relatives), the Caudata (salamanders and their extinct relatives), and the Gymnophiona (the limbless caecilians and their extinct relatives).

Salientians and caudatans are likely more closely related to each other than to caecilians. The name Batrachia is commonly used for the clade combining salientians and caudatans. A fourth group, the Allocaudata (also known as Albanerpetontidae) is also known, spanning 160 million years from the Middle Jurassic to the Early Pleistocene, but became extinct two million years ago.

For several decades, this name has been used for a group that includes all living amphibians, but excludes all the main groups of Paleozoic tetrapods, such as Temnospondyli, Lepospondyli, Embolomeri, and Seymouriamorpha. Most scientists have concluded that all of the primary groups of modern amphibians—frogs, salamanders and caecilians—are closely related.

Some writers have argued that the early Permian dissorophoid Gerobatrachus hottoni is a lissamphibian. If it is not, the earliest known lissamphibians are Triadobatrachus and Czatkobatrachus from the Early Triassic.

== Characteristics ==
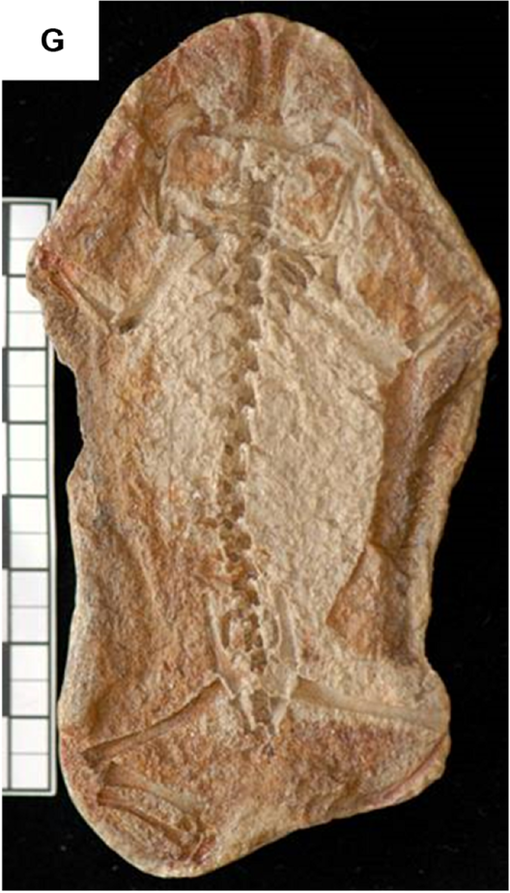
Reconstruction of Triadobatrachus, a salientian (early frog relative)

Some, if not all, lissamphibians share the following characteristics. Some of these apply to the soft body parts, hence do not appear in fossils. However, the skeletal characteristics also appear in several types of Palaeozoic amphibians:

- Double or paired occipital condyles
- Two types of skin glands (mucous and granular)
- Fat bodies associated with gonads
- Double-channeled sensory papillae in the inner ear
- Green rods (a special type of visual cell, unknown in caecilians)
- Ribs do not encircle body. In anurans the ribs are fused to their vertebrae, except in the suborder Archaeobatrachia which still has free ribs.
- Ability to elevate the eyes (with the levator bulbi muscle)
- Forced-pump respiratory mechanism, the primitive breathing system also found in labyrinthodont amphibians
- Cylindrical centra (the main body of the vertebrae; cylindrical centra are also found in several groups of early tetrapods)
- Pedicellate teeth (the crowns of the teeth are separated from the roots by a zone of fibrous tissue; also found in some Dissorophoidea; the teeth of some fossil salamanders are not pedicellate)
- Bicuspid teeth (two cusps per tooth, also found in juvenile dissorophoids)
- Batrachian operculum (small bone in the skull, linked to shoulder girdle by the opercularis muscle; perhaps involved in hearing and balance; absent in caecilians, fused to the otic capsule in some salamanders. This may have been lost in caecilians, or it may be a synapomorphy of Batrachia.
- Loss of posterior skull bones (also in Microsauria and Dissorophoidea)
- Small, widely separated pterygoid bones (also found in Temnospondyli and Nectridea)
- Wide cultriform process of the parasphenoid (also found in some Microsauria (Rhynchonkos) and Lysorophia)
- Presence of ampullae of Lorenzini in some salamanders and caecilians, but never in frogs

== Relationships and definition ==
The features uniting the Lissamphibia were first noted by Ernst Haeckel, even though in Haeckel's work, Lissamphibia excluded the caecilians. Nevertheless, Haeckel considered the caecilians to be closely related to what he called Lissamphibia (gr. λισσός, smooth), which is now called Batrachia and includes frogs and salamanders. In the early to mid 20th century, a biphyletic origin of amphibians (and thus of tetrapods in general) was favoured. In the late 20th century, a flood of new fossil evidence mapped out in some detail the nature of the transition between the elpistostegalid fish and the early amphibians. Most herpetologists and paleontologists, therefore, no longer accept the view that amphibians have arisen twice, from two related but separate groups of fish. The question then arises whether Lissamphibia is monophyletic as well. The origin and relationships of the various lissamphibian groups both with each other and among other early tetrapods remain controversial. Not all paleontologists today are convinced that Lissamphibia is indeed a natural group, as there are important characteristics shared with some non-lissamphibian Palaeozoic amphibians.

Currently, the two prevailing theories of lissamphibian origin are:

- Monophyletic within Temnospondyli
- Monophyletic within Lepospondyli

One of the hypotheses regarding their ancestors is that they evolved by paedomorphosis and miniaturization from early tetrapods.

Molecular studies of extant amphibians based on multiple-locus data favor one or the other of the monophyletic alternatives and indicate a Late Carboniferous date for the divergence of the lineage leading to caecilians from the one leading to frogs and salamanders, and an early Permian date for the separation of the frog and salamander groups.

The stem-caecilian Funcusvermis, described in 2023, retained many dissorophoid temnospondyl features, supporting a monophyletic Lissamphibia within clade Temnospondyli.

== Bibliography ==
- Benton, M. J. (2005), Vertebrate Palaeontology, 3rd ed. Blackwell.
- Carroll, R. L. (1988), Vertebrate Paleontology and Evolution, WH Freeman & Co.
- San Mauro, Diego; Miguel Vences; Marina Alcobendas; Rafael Zardoya; Axel Meyer (May 2005). "Initial diversification of living amphibians predated the breakup of Pangaea" (PDF). American Naturalist. 165 (5): 590–599. Bibcode:2005ANat..165..590S. doi:10.1086/429523. PMID 15795855. S2CID 17021360.
