= Doleserpeton =

Doleserpeton Temporal range: Upper Permian 285 Ma

Scientific classification
- Kingdom: Animalia
- Phylum: Chordata
- Clade: Tetrapoda
- Order: †Temnospondyli
- Family: †Amphibamidae
- Genus: †Doleserpeton
- Species: †D. annectens

Binomial name
- †Doleserpeton annectens Bolt, 1969

Extinct genus of amphibians

Doleserpeton is an extinct, monospecific genus of dissorophoidean temnospondyl within the family Amphibamidae that lived during the Upper Permian, 285 million years ago. Doleserpeton is represented by a single species, Doleserpeton annectens, which was first described by John R. Bolt in 1969. Fossil evidence of Doleserpeton was recovered from the Dolese Brothers Limestone Quarry in Fort Sill, Oklahoma. The genus name Doleserpeton is derived from the initial discovery site in Dolese quarry of Oklahoma and the Greek root "herp-", meaning "low or close to the ground". This transitional fossil displays primitive traits of amphibians that allowed for successful adaptation from aquatic to terrestrial environments. In many phylogenies, lissamphibians appear as the sister group of Doleserpeton.

== History and discovery ==
There was only one successful excavation of the genus Doleserpeton, which was during the initial discovery in 1969 by Bolt and his colleagues in Fort Sill, Oklahoma. The stratigraphic location of Doleserpeton was based in Fissure Fills and the Admirial Formation, which was dated back to the Upper Permian. All fossil specimens were preserved in limestone blocks, which was treated with an acid wash to clear away excess debris and minimize damage during the excavation process. The following fossil evidence of Doleserpeton was retrieved:

1. Several predominantly completed skulls
2. Brain case
3. Partial dentary
4. Partial vertebral column (15 vertebrae) with corresponding ribs
5. Incomplete sets of forelimbs and hindlimbs
6. Incomplete sets of digits
7. Pectoral girdles
8. Pelvic girdles

== Description ==
=== Skull ===
The skull is broad, rounded, and flat, and was estimated to be approximately 15mm but could reach a length of 19mm. Skull features of Doleserpeton included a deepened otic notch and expanded interpterygoid vacuities and vomers. The eye orbits in Doleserpeton are relatively large in proportion to the overall size of its skull. Inner ear characteristics of Doleserpeton share morphological similarities to salamanders in the otic region, in which the tympanum is not connected to the stapes.

==== Dentition ====
The distinguishing synapomorphy that defines Doleserpeton are its bicuspid, pedicellate teeth. Each bicuspid, pedicellate tooth in Doleserpeton had two cusps with a separation from the root by a region of uncalcified fibrous tissue. The uncalcified regions of the bicuspid teeth in Doleserpeton were often lost and replaced during its lifetime to support a carnivorous diet. The jaws contained 60 bicuspid, pedicellate teeth, in which 40 teeth were located in the upper jaw and 20 teeth were located in the lower jaw. Doleserpeton contained marginal teeth located on the premaxilla and palatal bones of the skull. It was hypothesized that Doleserpeton contained a range of 22-25 marginal teeth.

=== Vertebrae ===
Doleserpeton possessed rhachitomous vertebrae, in which the pleurocentrum dominates in size in each vertebra compared to the intercentrum. These "rhachitomous" vertebrae are unique to amphibians and their close relatives, and shared by Doleserpeton. Doleserpeton contained ten vertebrae in its cervical column, 24 presacral vertebrae, two sacral vertebrae, and an estimate of fifteen caudal vertebrae, concluded from fossil evidence. Rib attachment started at the second presacral vertebrae and continued throughout the length of its body until the sacral vertebrae. Rib size increased from ribs 2 through 4, and decreased in size after the fifth presacral vertebrae. Ribs were double-headed to allow a sturdy attachment for muscles to support its body mass on land.

=== Posture ===
Doleserpeton displayed a sprawling posture, in which locomotion was achieved on all four limbs while dragging part of its midsection on the ground. Sprawling posture is considered the most primitive trait of terrestrial locomotion, which is consistent with the evolutionary trend from aquatic to terrestrial adaptations. Sprawling posture allowed Doleserpeton to possess the stability and functionality to move on land while also being efficient and functional in aquatic environments.

=== Pectoral girdle ===
The development in pectoral girdle elements as well as pelvic girdle elements in Doleserpeton displayed the shift in traits that supported amphibious adaptions to aquatic and terrestrial environments. Limb structures of Doleserpeton were homologous to temnospondyli and to other derived terrestrial species. The prominence of the scapulocoracoid in the pectoral girdle ofDoleserpeton allowed them to move efficiently on land while supporting the upper half of its body. The humerus is robust and attached perpendicularly to the scauplcorcoid. The carpals, metacarpals, and digits of Doleserpeton were allowed for full mobility of its forelimbs and joints to travel on land while providing adequate support for its body mass and size.

=== Pelvic girdle ===
The pelvic girdle also displays the same characteristics as the pectoral girdle. The femur is elongated and enlarged and place perpendicularly to the pelvic girdle. The proximal end of the femur was enlarged to allow strong muscle attachment and also displayed well developed tarsals, metatarsals, and phalanges that served the same purposes for mobility and flexibility of joints in their hindlimbs.

=== Digits ===
The digit formula for Doleserpeton is 4 digits on the forelimbs and 5 digits on the hindlimb. This digit formula is primitive to all living amphibians with a few exceptions in Caecilian and some outlying amphibious species.

== Classification ==
Parsimony-based cladistic analysis and Bayesian inference analysis were utilized to analyze 20 taxa and 51 characters to classify Doleserpeton. Finite classification of Doleserpeton still remain dubious because of the uncertainty of the phylogenetic classification of the family Amphibamidae and the subclass Lissamphibia. The classification of the family Amphibamidae is based on three hypotheses regarding the origin of Lissamphibia, which conflict regarding the evolutionary position of Doleserpeton in relation to its primitive ancestors and descendants. The three hypotheses of Lissamphibia origin are:

1. Monophyletic origin of Lissamphibia from Temnospondyli
2. Monophyletic origin of Lissamphibia from Lepospondyli
3. Diphyletic(branching) origin of Lissamphibia from both Temnospondyli and Lepospondyli

The most parsimonious tree showed that Doleserpeton is loosely classified as the sister group to the genus Amphibamus within the family Amphibamidae. Character traits that support this phylogenetic classification include the following synapomorphies: bicuspid teeth, morphological similarities in larval stages, and separation between the crown and base of the tooth in its pedicellate dentition.

== Paleobiology ==
Physical characteristics from fossil evidence of Doleserpeton indicate that they resembled modern newts and salamanders. The overall size of Doleserpeton was relatively small, with an estimated body length of 55 mm (2.165 inches) from snout to tail. Morphological features of Doleserpeton indicated that they were quadrupedal with elongate bodies and a lizard-like appearance. Their overall body morphology included short limbs protruding from a 90-degree angle, long tails, and flattened skulls with blunt snouts. Doleserpeton may have had smooth, granular skin to adapt to the transition from aquatic to terrestrial environments. Fossil evidence and classification of Doleserpeton predicted that they transitioned through metamorphic stages throughout their life, but lived primarily on terrestrial land during juvenile and adult stages. Like their modern amphibious relatives Lissamphibia, Doleserpeton may have had to rely on the availability of a nearby water source during reproduction and larval stages.

=== Ontogeny ===
The skeletal elements from fossil evidence were well ossified, which supported the notion that Doleserpeton lived a primarily terrestrial life after metamorphosis. A well ossified skeletal structure in Doleserpeton indicated the lack of maturity in several Doleserpeton specimens. The ossification process in Doleserpeton deviates from typical terrestrial skeletal ossification, in which well ossified skeletal elements were indicators of maturity in terrestrial organisms. Variation in ossification in fossil specimens of Dolserpeton infer the possibility of skeletal changes in adult stages in life, concluding that the fossil evidence can only support characteristics that would define skeletal elements and characteristics only up to juvenile stages.

== See also ==
- Prehistoric amphibian
- List of prehistoric amphibians
