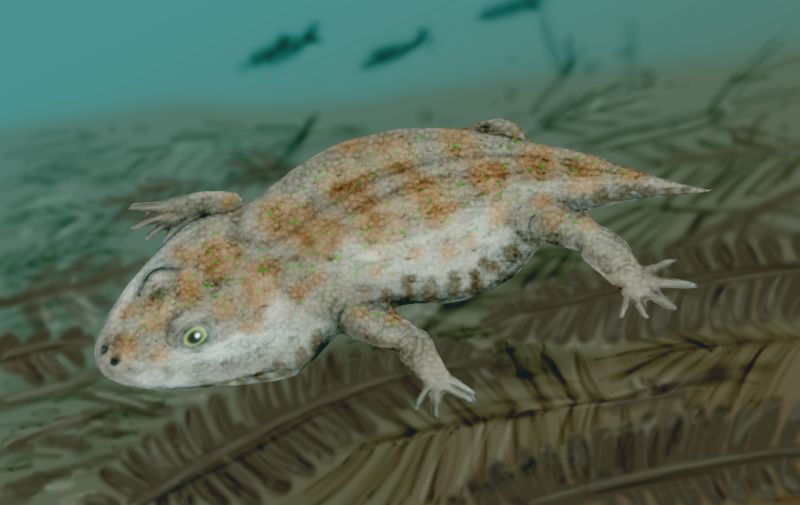
- Amphibamus grandiceps

Scientific classification
- Kingdom: Animalia
- Phylum: Chordata
- Clade: Tetrapoda
- Order: †Temnospondyli
- Family: †Amphibamidae
- Genus: †Amphibamus; Cope, 1865
- Species: †A. grandiceps

Binomial name
- †Amphibamus grandiceps Cope, 1865

= Amphibamus =

Amphibamus Temporal range: late Carboniferous (Pennsylvanian)

Genus of amphibians

Amphibamus is a genus of amphibamid temnospondyl amphibians from the Carboniferous (middle Pennsylvanian) of North America. This animal is considered to have been close to the ancestry of modern amphibians. Its length was about 20 centimetres (7.9 in).

The generic name Amphibamus alludes to the two modes of locomotion of the animal, swimming with its oar-shaped tail, and crawling because of its long fingers with claws, from Greek ἀμφί (amphí) "both" and -βάμων (-bámōn) "that goes" or βᾶμα (bâma) "leg".

== Gallery ==
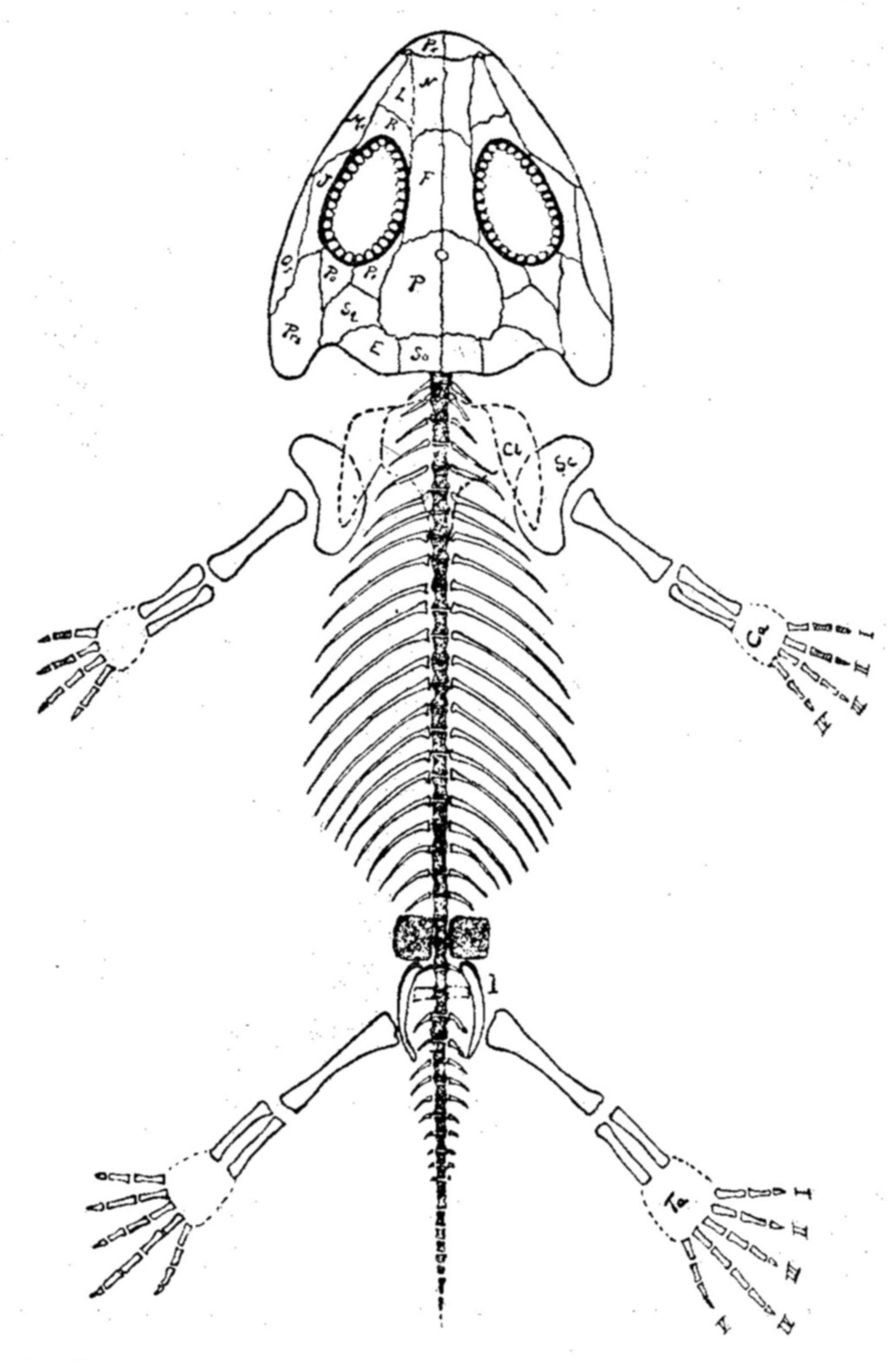
Amphibamus grandiceps skeleton

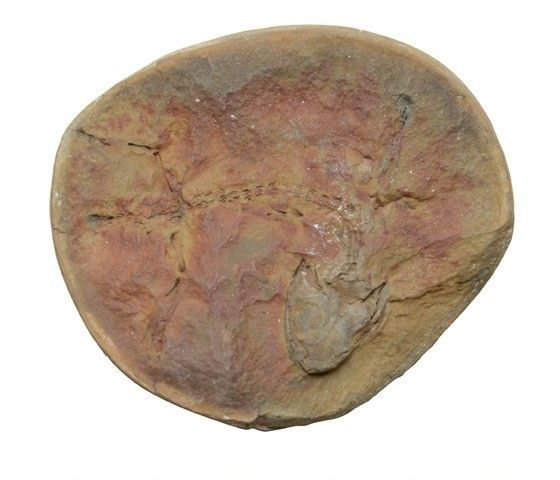
Amphibamus grandiceps fossil
