= Archer City Formation =

Geologic formation in Texas, United States

- Stratigraphic range: Early Permian, Asselian–early Sakmarian
- Type: Formation
- Unit of: Bowie Group
- Underlies: Nocona Formation
- Overlies: Markley Formation

Lithology
- Primary: mudstone
- Other: sandstone, siltstone

Location
- Region: Texas
- Country: United States

Type section
- Named for: Archer City, Texas
- Named by: Hentz & Brown, 1987
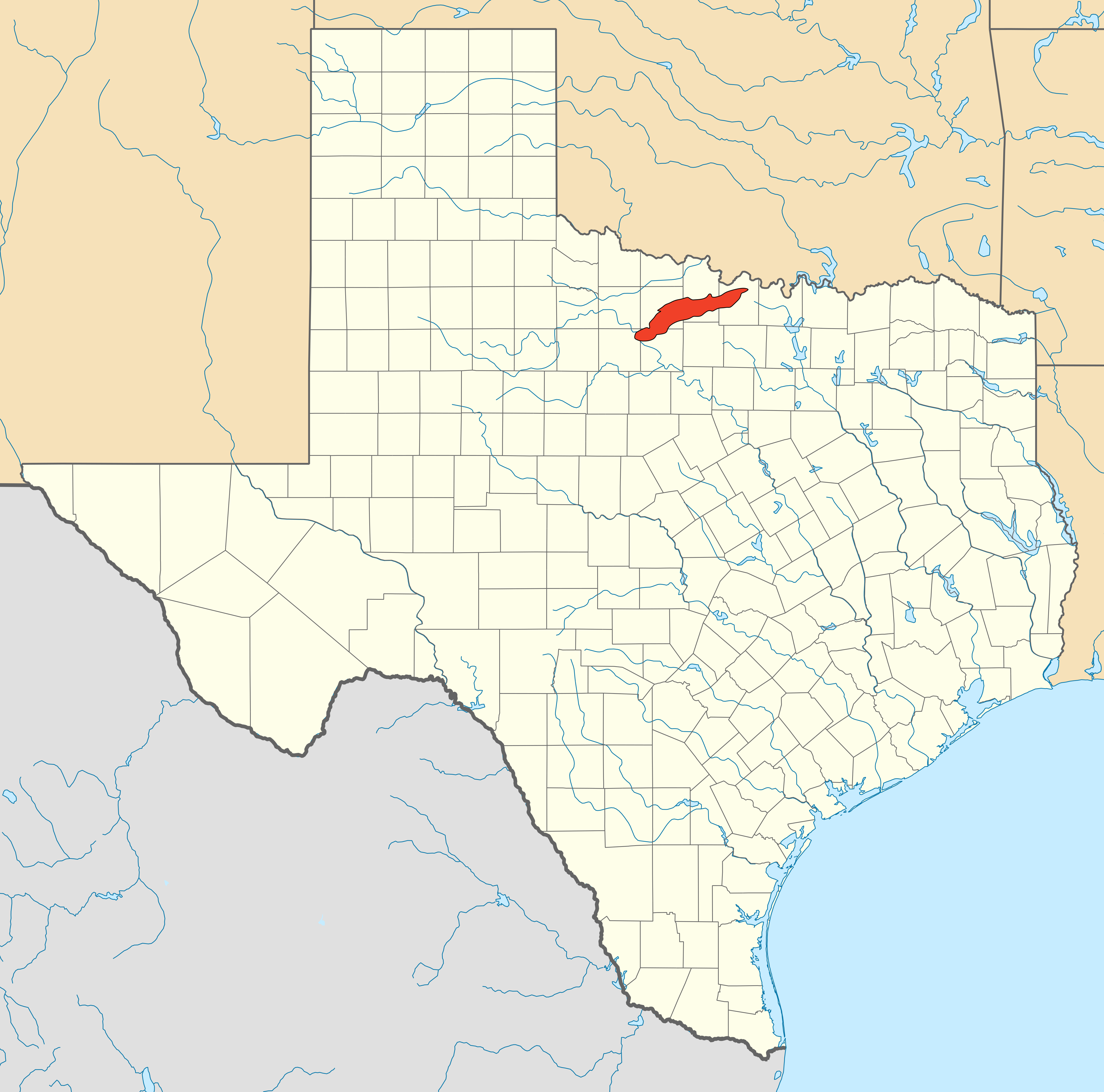

The Archer City Formation is a geological formation in north-central Texas, preserving fossils from the Asselian and early Sakmarian stages of the Permian period. It is the earliest component of the Texas red beds, introducing a tropical ecosystem which will persist in the area through the rest of the Early Permian. The Archer City Formation is preceded by the cool Carboniferous swamp sediments of the Markley Formation, and succeeded by the equally fossiliferous red beds of the Nocona Formation. The Archer City Formation was not named as a unique geological unit until the late 1980s. Older studies generally labelled its outcrops as the Moran or Putnam formations, which are age-equivalent marine units to the southwest.

The sediments of the Archer City Formation reconstruct a coastal floodplain crossed by small meandering rivers and isolated ponds. The climate was hot and monsoonal, preserving a variety of paleosols and plant assemblages ranging from dry upland forests to moist riverside galleries. "Seed ferns" (Sphenopteris, Autunia, Odontopteris, etc.) and early conifers (Walchia, etc.) occupied drier soils, while marattialean ferns (Pecopteris, Asterotheca, etc.) and horsetails (Sphenophyllum, Annularia, Calamites, etc.) were prominent in more humid areas.

The Archer City Formation preserves a diverse fauna of fossil vertebrates in pond bonebeds across Archer and Clay counties. Many fossils are rare fragments of species which are better-preserved in younger parts of the red beds. Nevertheless, complete skeletons and important type specimens are also known from the formation. Some notable synapsids include Apsisaurus witteri, Edaphosaurus boanerges, Ophiacodon uniformis, and Dimetrodon milleri. Early reptiles such as Protorothyris archeri and Romeria spp. make up a small component of the terrestrial fauna. Amphibians are common in every niche, with examples such as Phonerpeton pricei, Neldasaurus wrightei, Edops craigi, Eryops megacephalus, and Pantylus cordatus, just to name a few. The rivers were roamed by Orthacanthus texensis (a xenacanth "shark") and Ectosteorhachis nitidus (a megalichthyid fish).

== History and stratigraphy ==
Fossil bonebeds in the vicinity of Archer City were first investigated in detail by Alfred Romer and Llewellyn Price, starting in the late 1920s. At the time, these bonebeds were assigned to the Pueblo, Moran, or Putnam formations of the Cisco Group. The Archer City Formation was first named in a 1987 geological map seeking to update the stratigraphy of North Texas. The formation and its stratigraphic placement were formalized in text a year later.

The formation outcrops in an arc from Montague County in the east, through Clay, Archer, and Young counties, as far as Throckmorton County in the west. It is most broadly exposed in Clay and Archer counties, including under its namesake of Archer City.

The Archer City Formation is a unit of the Bowie Group, lying above the Markley Formation and below the Nocona Formation of the Wichita Group. Some publications have labelled the Nocona Formation as the "Upper Archer City Formation", thus considering the Archer City Formation to be a unit of the Wichita Group. This proposal is not widely agreed upon. The Cisco Group and its constituent formations have been restricted to marine strata further south and west. Of these strata, the Archer City Formation is roughly equivalent in time to the uppermost Pueblo Formation, the Moran Formation, the Sedwick Formation, and the Santa Anna Branch shale (= Putnam Formation), from oldest to youngest.

=== Age ===
Based on correlations with coastal strata further west, the Carboniferous-Permian boundary is positioned near the top of the Markley Formation. This suggests that the Archer City Formation occupies most of the Asselian (299–293 Ma), the first global stage of the Permian Period. The plant fossils of the Archer City Formation also resemble those of Asselian Europe. The upper part of the Archer City Formation may extend into the succeeding Sakmarian stage (293–290 Ma). The Santa Anna Branch Shale and overlying Coleman Junction Limestone both preserve fossils of Sweetognathus merrilli, a conodont index fossil of the early Sakmarian. The Asselian and Sakmarian global stages are equivalent to the early-middle parts of the Wolfcampian regional stage.

== Paleoenvironment ==
As with the rest of the Texas red beds, the Archer City Formation was deposited on a coastal plain between an inland marine basin in the west and patches of steadily eroding mountains in the north and east. Some of the mountains are still standing in the present day, such as the Wichita Mountains and Arbuckle Mountains, while others have been fully eroded or buried, such as the Texan portion of the Ouachita Mountains. The marine basin is formally known as the Midland Basin, a major component of the Permian Basin oil field. Rising sea levels through the Early Permian allowed the coastline to gradually transgress northward and eastward. The major bonebed sites of the Archer City Formation were probably 40–60 km (25–37 mi) away from the coast.

During the Permian, the area was near the equator, with a latitude of 0° to 5° N. Temperature estimates can be inferred for the Archer City Formation via δ18O records for hematite and phyllosilicate minerals in paleosols. These data points suggest soil temperatures of 31–35 °C (88–95 °F), significantly warmer than the cool and wet conditions of the Markley Formation. This fits with climate evidence from rapid sedimentary changes between the formations, as well as an increasingly patchy distribution of high-humidity flora. The Archer City Formation would have had a hot monsoonal climate, with moist or swampy areas shrinking to the vicinity of riverbanks and ponds during the dry season.

== Geology ==
In terms of their lithologies, the Archer City and Nocona formations are nearly indistinguishable, with equivalent sets of fluvial and floodplain sediments. The vast majority of each formation is homogeneous red mudstone with small calcareous nodules. Fluvial sandstone beds and paleosols are also common. Fossils and other organic debris are concentrated into rare greyish claystone bonebeds, which correspond to perennial ponds. Most of the pond bonebeds are too small to continuously support an ecosystem of large aquatic vertebrates, suggesting that the carcasses may have been washed in from larger bodies of water.

=== Sandstone beds ===
By volume, the most prevalent sandstone beds are upwards-fining stacks of point bar, scroll-bar, and coarser channel fill deposits. These are all hallmarks of small meandering rivers, with channels only a few meters wide. Other common sandstone features include subdued, fine-grained crevasse splay deposits. The crevasse splays are often associated with plant fossils which have been remineralized by copper minerals.

Some sandstone beds are isolated straight channel fills, without corresponding riverbank deposits. These straight beds may reach 30 meters in width (though most are much narrower) and several kilometers in length. Coarser beds preserve sinuous megaripples while finer channels develop small climbing ripples towards the top. Straight channels would have formed during high-energy erosion events, but the climate was probably too moist for frequent flash floods.

=== Paleosols ===
Four different types of paleosol (labelled types E through H) have been identified in the Archer City Formation. Three (F, G, and H) first appear in this formation, while type E paleosols are retained from the underlying Markley Formation. All four continue to persist through the Texas Lower Permian up until an aridification event in the mid-Clear Fork Group. The paleosols are generally dark red or brown, with only intermittent gleying in the type E variety. The Archer City Formation mostly lacks the high-humidity paleosol varieties of the Markley Formation (types A through D).

Type E paleosols are silty or fine sandy soils with persistent mottling, hematite nodules, and few distinct horizons. They are a type of entisol, young soils corresponding to isolated, frequently disturbed areas with a high water table, such as riverbanks. Type F paleosols are alfisols, patterned with deep root casts and numerous horizons, including intermediate layers with calcareous nodules and smectite clay. They develop in stable forested uplands with a low water table and a semi-arid to subhumid climate (~70 cm of annual precipitation). Type G paleosols are similar, with sandy vertical cracks and abundant calcareous nodules. They qualify as vertisols, inundated and dried at a seasonal frequency along the margins of a floodplain. Type H paleosols have an even greater proportion of calcareous minerals, forming blocky crusts interspersed among chlorite- and mica-rich clay. They could be termed aridisols or (more broadly) inceptisols, deposited in dry upland areas free from the influence of groundwater.

== Paleobiota ==
Color key: Taxon / Reclassified taxon / Taxon falsely reported as present / Dubious taxon or junior synonym / Ichnotaxon / Ootaxon / Morphotaxon	Notes; Uncertain or tentative taxa are in small text; ~~crossed out~~ taxa are discredited.

=== Synapsids ===
Synapsids of the Archer City Formation
Genus	Species	Material	Notes	Images
Apsisaurus	A. witteri	A partial skeleton	A varanopid, originally identified as a diapsid reptile.	
Dimetrodon	D. milleri	Nearly complete skeleton	A small sail-backed sphenacodontid	
Edaphosaurus	E. boanerges	Isolated neural spines and at least one partial skeleton	A common medium-sized edaphosaurid, often confused with Edaphosaurus cruciger.	
Lupeosaurus	L. kayi	Limb and hip bones and vertebrae	A basal edaphosaurid	
Ophiacodon	O. retroversus	Rare fragments	A large ophiacodontid, also described under the names Theropleura and Diopeus.	
Ophiacodon	O. uniformis	A partial skeleton with a well-preserved skull	A medium-sized ophiacodontid, also described under the name Poliosaurus.	
Stereophallodon	S. ciscoensis	Skull fragments and vertebrae	A large ophiacodontid	

=== Reptiles ===
Reptiles of the Archer City Formation
Genus	Species	Material	Notes	Images
Bolosaurus	B. striatus	A jaw	A bolosaurid parareptile	
Protorothyris	P. archeri	Five skulls with associated postcranial material	A protorothyridid eureptile	
Romeria	R. prima	A skull	A captorhinid eureptile	
Romeria	R. texana	A partial skull and partial skeleton	A captorhinid eureptile	

=== Temnospondyls ===
Temnospondyls of the Archer City Formation
Genus	Species	Material	Notes	Images
Acheloma	A. cumminsi	Partial skull and postcrania	A trematopid	
Aspidosaurus	A. sp.	Neural spine armor fragments	A dissorophid	
Broiliellus	B. brevis	Two skulls, one with a partial skeleton	A dissorophid	
Brevidorsum	B. profundum	Partial skull and postcrania	A dissorophid	
Diploseira	D. angusta	A partial skeleton	A dissorophid, formerly considered a species of Dissorophus.	
Edops	E. craigi	Several skulls and postcrania	An edopoid	
Eryops	E. megacephalus	Jaws and other fragments	A common eryopid	
Neldasaurus	N. wrightae	Four partial skulls and postcania	A trimerorhachid dvinosaur	
"Parioxys"	"P." bolli	A partial skeleton	A temnospondyl of uncertain affinities. Parioxys ferricolus, the more complete type species of Parioxys, has variably been interpreted as an eryopoid or a dissorophid."Parioxys" bolli is based on more fragmentary fossils and may belong to an unrelated genus, perhaps a trematopid related to Ecolsonia cutlerensis.	
Pasawioops	P. cf. mayi	A skull	A micropholid amphibamiform	
Phonerpeton	P. pricei	At least seven skulls with associated postcranial fragments	A trematopid, formerly considered a species of Acheloma.	
Reiszerpeton	R. renascentis	A skull	A dissorophid	
Tersomius	T. texensis	A skull	A micropholid amphibamiform	
Trimerorhachis	T. sp.		A trimerorhachid dvinosaur. Reports from the Archer City Formation are unsubstantiated, though it is known from time-equivalent strata in New Mexico.	
Zatrachys	Z. serratus	Skull fragments	A zatracheid	

=== Other amphibians ===
Non-temnospondyl amphibians of the Archer City Formation
Genus	Species	Material	Notes	Images
Archeria	A. crassidisca	Jaws and vertebrae	An archeriid embolomere, often conflated with the more fragmentary genus Cricotus.	
Diadectes	D. sideropelicus	Jaws and vertebrae	A diadectomorph	
Diplocaulus	D. sp.	Vertebrae	A diplocaulid nectridean	
Pantylus	P. cordatus	Multiple skeletons in varying states of completeness	A pantylid microsaur	
Sauropleura	S. bairdi	Partial skeleton	A urocordylid nectridean	
Seymouria	S. baylorensis	Vertebrae	A seymouriamorph	

=== Fish ===
Scales of indeterminate palaeoniscoids, spines of Xenacanthus, Hybodus, Ctenacanthus, and "Anodontacanthus americanus" (= Platyacanthus), and teeth of Barbclabornia luederensis, Helodus, Gnathorhiza, petalodonts, and cladodonts have also been reported from bonebeds of the Archer City Formation.

Fish of the Archer City Formation
Genus	Species	Material	Notes	Images
Ectosteorhachis	E. nitidus	Scales, jaws, and a skull	A megalichthyid tetrapodomorph	
Orthacanthus	O. compressus	Teeth	A xenacanth "shark"	
Orthacanthus	O. texensis	Teeth, fin spines, cartilage fragments, and a skull	A xenacanth "shark"	
Sagenodus	S. sp.	Tooth plates	A lungfish	

=== Plants ===
Plant fossils in the Archer City Formation are concentrated at two sites in Clay County: Kola Switch and Sanzenbacher Ranch. Both sites were discovered in 1940–1941 by Adolph H. Witte, a local geologist working for the WPA. Though Witte's original collections have been lost, he sampled the sites further in 1961, along with USGS geologists Sergius H. Mamay and Arthur D. Watt. On behalf of the USNM, Mamay led another expedition in 1990–1991.

The floral diversity of the Archer City Formation strongly overlaps with other Asselian-Sakmarian formations in the southwestern United States. These include the Bursum and Abo formations of New Mexico and the Neal Ranch Formation of West Texas. There are some notable differences, such as a lack of marattialean ferns in the Bursum Formation and a greater variety of swamp foliage in the Neal Ranch Formation. Many of the broader groups prevalent in these formations are equally abundant in the Rotliegend of Europe, even if only a few specific species (such as Autunia conferta) are common in both regions. Conversely, there is little similarity with swampy coal-bearing areas such as the Dunkard Group of the Appalachian Basin. This is most likely a consequence of local environmental factors rather than a turnover of plant diversity at the Permo-Carboniferous boundary.

==== Kola Switch ====
The Kola Switch site is divided into three different layers in a 1.4 meters (4.6 feet) thick interval, each with a different set of fossils. The lower bed is pale upwards-fining siltstone, the middle bed is dark shale with carbonaceous impressions, and the upper bed is greenish claystone.

The seed fern Sphenopteris germanica is the most abundant plant fossil in the lower bed. The conifer Walchia (W. cf. schneideri, W. piniformis) is also common, followed by the seed ferns Odontopteris (O. subcrenulata, O. osmundaeformis, O. cf. readii), and Autunia (A. conferta, A. naumannii). The plants tend to be adapted to low humidity; macrofossils of moisture-loving plants such as ferns and sphenophytes (horsetails) are very rare, despite the evidence for deposition in a slow stream channel. The most common palynomorphs are Columinisporites ovalis (sphenophyll spores), Potonieisporites spp. (conifer pollen), Colatisporites decorus (indeterminate pollen), and Vesicaspora (seed fern pollen).

Conversely, the middle bed is almost entirely marattialean ferns. These include Pecopteris cf. jongmansii, Aphlebia erdmannii, Asterotheca sp, and several more unnamed species. Sphenophytes such as Sphenophyllum are also present. Vesicaspora and Potonieisporites continue to make up a significant portion of the palynomorphs, though Knoxisporites cf. ruhlandii (indeterminate spores), Cyclogranisporites spp. (marattialean spores), and Punctatisporites spp. (marattialean spores) are even more dominant. The middle bed represents foliage washed into a nearby stagnant pond.

The upper bed has the greatest portion of sphenophytes, not just sphenophylls (Sphenophyllum cf. thonii) but also calamitaleans (Annularia carinata, Calamites). Otherwise, the floral diversity of the upper bed encompasses the same species as the other Kola Switch beds. The upper bed palynoflora is mostly Columinisporites ovalis, Colatisporites decorus, Vesicaspora, Potonieisporites, and the bisaccate pollen Platysaccus cf. saarensis. The combination of fossils from the lower and middle bed is peculiar considering their strongly different depositional environments.

==== Sanzenbacher Ranch ====
The Sanzenbacher flora occupies a narrow layer of greyish claystone coarsening upwards to buff-colored siltstone. The most abundant plants are dry-soil species of seed ferns and conifers. Seed fern species include Autunia conferta, Sphenopteris germanica, Neurodontopteris auriculata, Odontopteris subcrenulata, and Rhachiphyllum schenkii, among others. Walchia is the most common conifer, followed by Cordaites. Riparian plants are less common but far from rare, giving Sanzenbacher a 'mixed' ecosystem character similar to, but drier than, the upper bed of Kola Switch. Marattialean ferns such as Pecopteris and Asterotheca are occasionally prevalent. Sphenophytes include Calamites, Annularia spicata, and to a lesser extent species of Sphenophyllum. The most common palynomorphs are seed fern pollen (Vesicaspora, Wilsonites, Anguisporites), while conifer pollen (Potonieisporites) and spores are rarer. Still, the palynomorph diversity of Sanzenbacher is much greater than at Kola Switch.

== See also ==
- Red Beds of Texas and Oklahoma
- List of fossiliferous stratigraphic units in Texas
- Paleontology in Texas
- Permian
