= Red Beds of Texas and Oklahoma =

Geologic strata in the southwestern United States

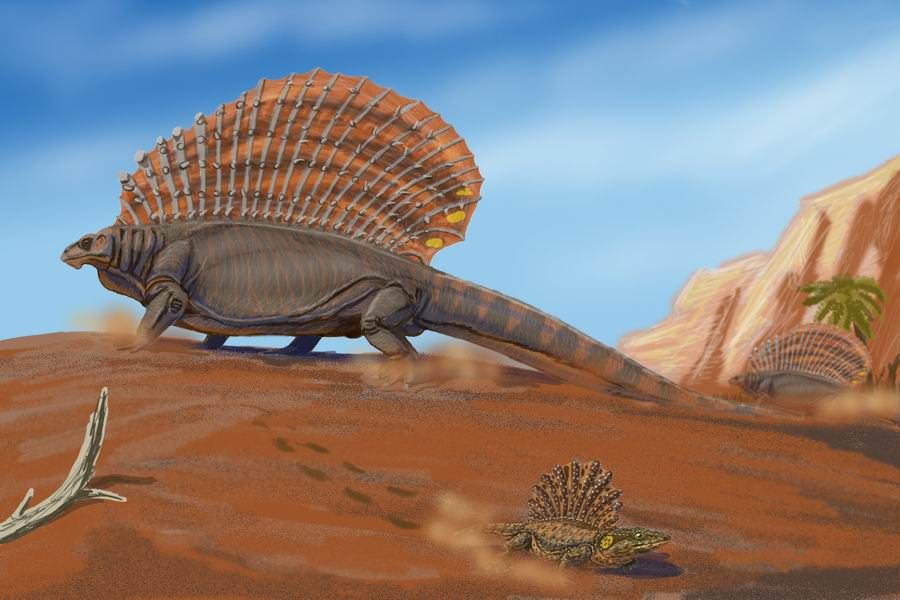
Artist's rendering of Edaphosaurus pogonias and Platyhystrix

The Red Beds of Texas and Oklahoma are a group of Early Permian-age geologic strata in the southwestern United States cropping out in north-central Texas and south-central Oklahoma. They comprise several stratigraphic groups, including the Clear Fork Group, the Wichita Group, and the Pease River Group. The Red Beds were first explored by American paleontologist Edward Drinker Cope starting in 1877. Fossil remains of many Permian tetrapods (four-limbed vertebrates) have been found in the Red Beds, including those of Dimetrodon, Edaphosaurus, Seymouria, Platyhystrix, and Eryops. A recurring feature in many of these animals is the sail structure on their backs.

== Location ==
Deposits dating from the Permian are present contiguously stretching from central Texas all the way into southern Nebraska. In Nebraska and Kansas, deposits of light-colored limestone are frequent, while red-colored rocks are rare. In Oklahoma, the light-colored limestone transitions gradually into red-colored sandstone and shale until the limestone is virtually nonexistent in north-central Texas. The portion of the red beds with abundant fossil deposits is in Texas between the Red River and the Salt Fork Brazos River. The area includes the city of Wichita Falls, and rural communities such as Seymour and Archer City.

== Properties ==
The Texas and Oklahoma red beds are sedimentary rocks, mostly consisting of sandstone and red mudstone. The red color of the rocks is due to the presence of ferric oxide. The rocks were deposited during the early Permian in a warm, moist climate, with seasonal periods of dry conditions.

== Stratigraphy ==
The Texas and Oklahoma red beds can be split into three primary stratigraphic groups: the Wichita Group, the Clear Fork Group, and the Pease River Group. The Wichita Group is the oldest of the three groups, having been deposited in the Sakmarian age. The Wichita Group contains some of the richest fossil deposits in the red beds, including the Geraldine Bonebed in Archer County. The Pease River Group is the most recent deposition, occurring during the Guadalupian epoch. The Clear Fork Group is in between the other two, being deposited during the Kungurian age. The stratigraphic groups are layered such that the Pease River Group overlies the Clear Fork Group, which overlies the Wichita group.

From youngest to oldest:

- Pease River Group
  - Blaine Formation
  - San Angelo Formation
- Clear Fork Group
  - Upper Clear Fork (Choza Formation)
  - Middle Clear Fork (Vale Formation)
  - Lower Clear Fork (Arroyo Formation)
- Wichita Group
  - Waggoner Ranch Formation (equivalent to the Lueders Formation, Clyde Formation, Belle Plains Formation)
  - Petrolia Formation (equivalent to the Belle Plains Formation)
  - Nocona Formation (equivalent to the Admiral Formation)
- Bowie Group
  - Archer City Formation (equivalent to the Moran Formation, Putnam Formation)

== Fossil record ==
In 1877, Edward Drinker Cope was the first paleontologist to study the red beds in search of fossils. Cope employed collectors to aid him in his search for bones, including Swiss botanist Jacob Boll. After Boll's death in 1880 while collecting, Cope employed preacher W.F. Cummins to continue the search. After Cope, paleontologists such as Ermine Cowles Case and Alfred Romer found rich deposits of Permian-era tetrapods.

=== Geraldine Bonebed ===
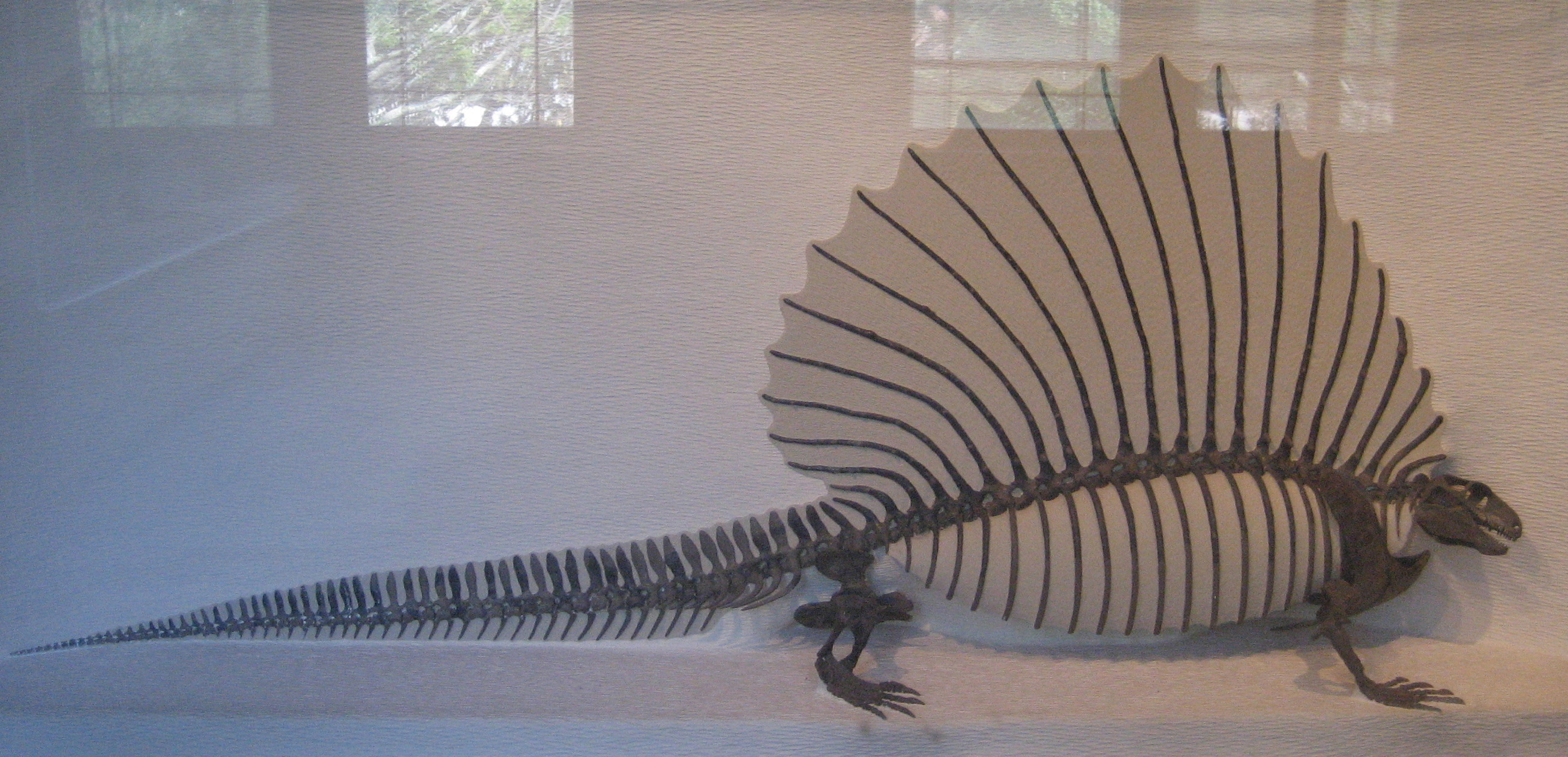
Edaphosaurus boanerges fossil skeleton from Archer County, on display in Harvard Museum of Natural History

The most prolific fossil site in the red beds is the Geraldine Bonebed within the Nocona Formation of the Wichita Group. During the Permian, the bonebed was the site of a freshwater pond. After a catastrophic event this became the burial site for a variety of terrestrial and marine animals. As a result, the bonebed contains a cross-section of life during the early Permian. Plant remains found in the bonebed include Calamites, ferns, and conifers. Marine life present in the bonebed include Xenacanthus, ostracods, and lungfish. The Geraldine Bonebed is most famous as a prolific source of temnospondyls, synapsids, basal reptiliomorphs and reptiles, including partial and complete skeletons of Archeria, Eryops, Edaphosaurus, Dimetrodon, Bolosaurus, Trimerorhachis, Zatrachys, and Ophiacodon.

=== Clear Fork deposits ===
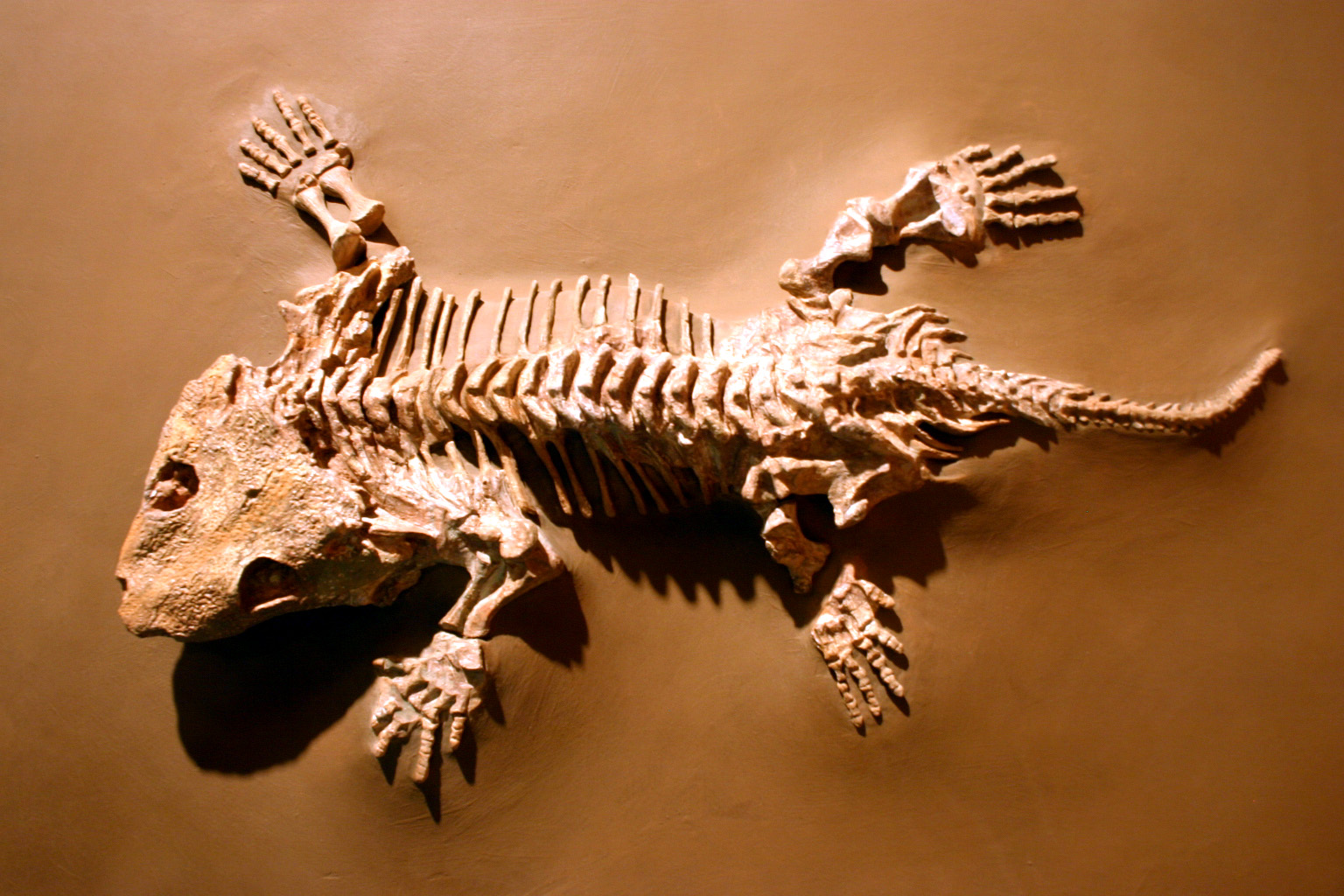
Seymouria baylorensis skeleton

The Clear Fork Group also contains multiple fossil sites. Like the Geraldine Bonebed and other Wichita Group sites, the Clear Fork Group is most famous for its early Permian amphibian deposits, especially Seymouria baylorensis. The species and genus were first discovered in 1904 by German paleontologist Ferdinand Broili. Seymouria baylorensis is named for the location of its discovery in Baylor County near the city of Seymour. As one of the few Seymouria bone sites in the world, paleontologists have studied the Clear Fork deposit for evidence of Seymouria as a transitional fossil between aquatic and terrestrial animals, as well as Seymouria's close relationship to amniotes.

The Clear Fork Group also contains deposits of plant species throughout its different sections. The increasing prevalence of seed plants with pockets of water-based plants can be used to infer a wet, but drying climate.

== See also ==
- Geology of Wichita Falls, Texas
- Geology of Texas
- Paleontology in Texas
