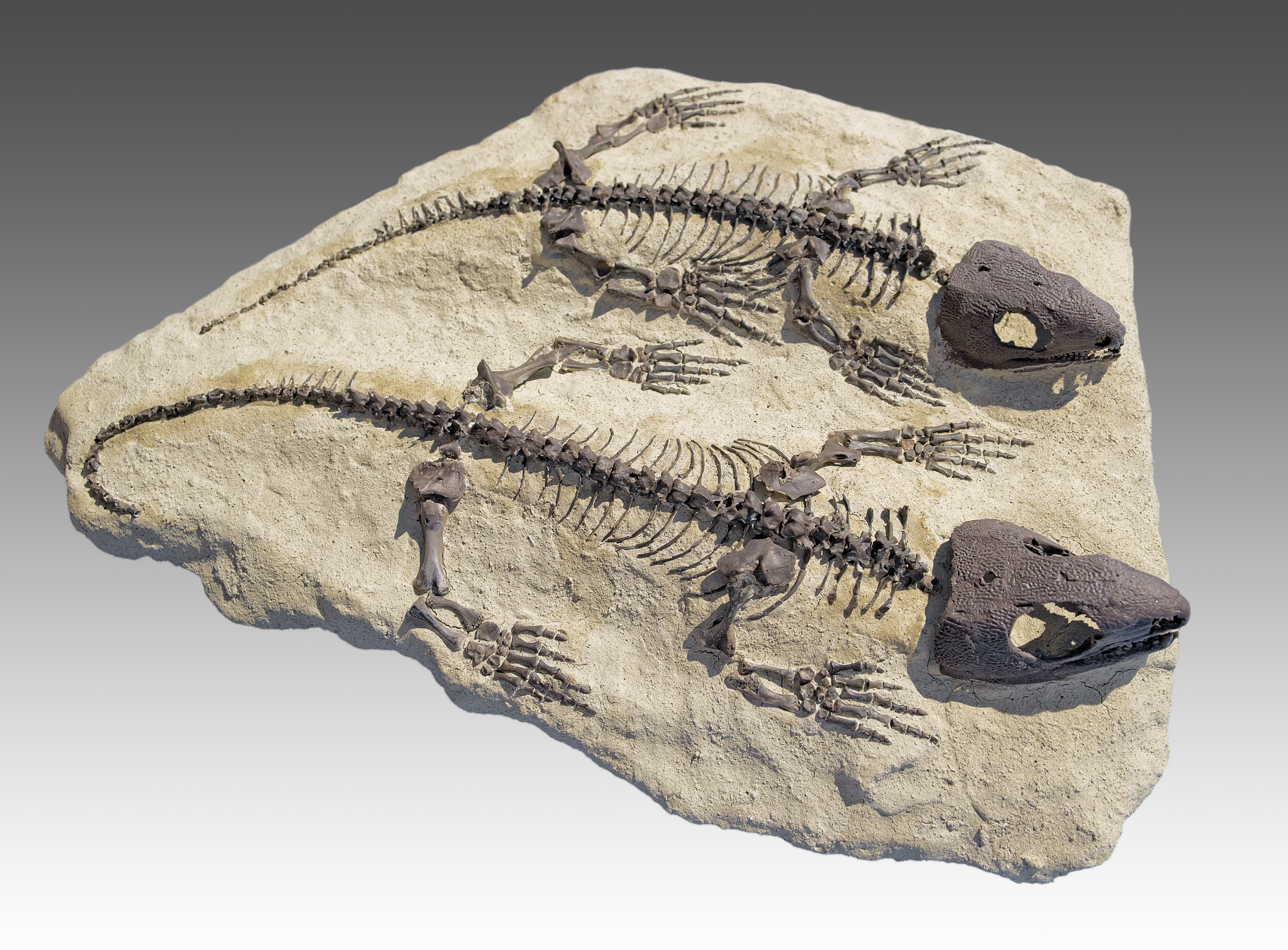
- Two C. aguti specimens, Cisuralian (299-270 Ma), Oklahoma, United States

Scientific classification
- Kingdom: Animalia
- Phylum: Chordata
- Family: †Captorhinidae
- Genus: †Captorhinus; Cope, 1895

Type species
- †Captorhinus aguti Cope, 1895

Synonyms
- Hyponous Cope, 1896; Hypopnous Auctt. (Missp.); Bayloria Olson, 1941; Paracaptorhinus Watson, 1954; Eocaptorhinus Heaton, 1979

= Captorhinus =

Captorhinus Temporal range: Cisuralian ~280–270.6 Ma

Extinct genus of reptiles

Captorhinus (from Greek: καπτō kaptō, 'to gulp down' and Greek: ῥῑνός rhīnós, 'nose') is an extinct genus of captorhinid reptiles that lived during the Permian period. Its remains are known from North America (Oklahoma, Texas) and possibly South America. It is known from mummified specimens preserving its anatomy in exceptionally high detail.

== History of discovery ==
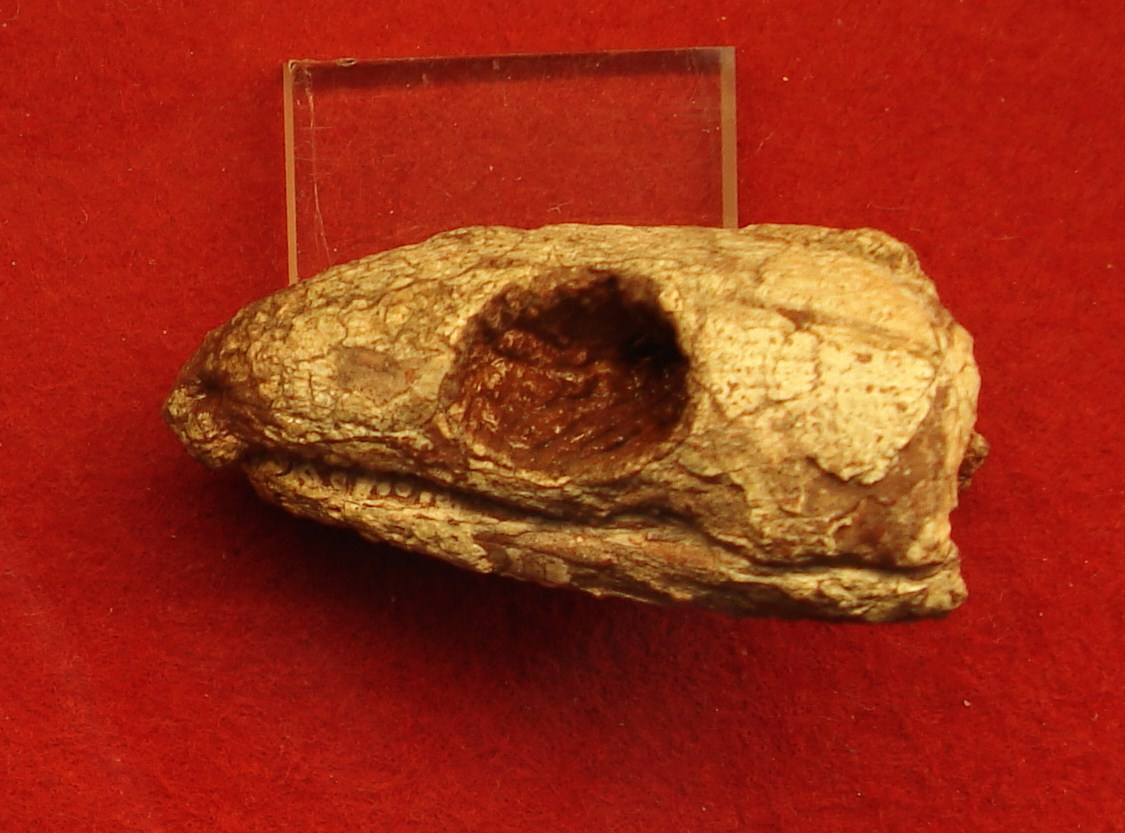
Skull of C. isolomus, now a synonym of C. aguti

In 1882, Edward Cope described a fragmentary skull from the Lower Permian of Texas collected by W. F. Cummins at Coffee Creek as Ectocynodon aguti. The name had then been revised several times by different paleontologists as more genera were discovered. In 1911, paleontologist Ermine Cowles Case revised the recently discovered species. He decided to refer P. (Ectodynodon) aguti, P. aduncus, and P. isolomus to Captorhinus, and established a new family, Captorhinidae.

Named by Cope from the Latin word, "captor," meaning "one who catches something," and the Greek word, "rhino," meaning, "of the nose." This is based on the theory that the characteristically curved premaxilla of Captorhinus may have been used to catch prey.

== Description ==
Size of C. aguti compared to a human hand

While there are several forms of Captorhinus, there are three main species that are the best known. The previously mentioned Captorhinus aguti is the type species of Captorhinus, but there is also a fair amount of material collected on Captorhinus magnus and Captorhinus laticeps.

The most distinguishable trait of Captorhinus is its namesake: the hooking of the snout from prominent ventral angulation of the premaxillary process. Other notable characteristics include the dorsally positioned alary process of the jugal on the medial surface and flushed with the orbital margin, the retroarticular process longer anteroposteriorly than broad, and the anteriormost dentary tooth strongly procumbent. The posterior teeth are either chisel-shaped or ogival. Until the late 1990s, Captorhinus was diagnosed by the presence of multiple rows of marginal teeth on the maxillary and dentary bones. However, single-rowed captorhinid elements have been discovered, proving this hypothesis incorrect.

=== Captorhinus aguti ===
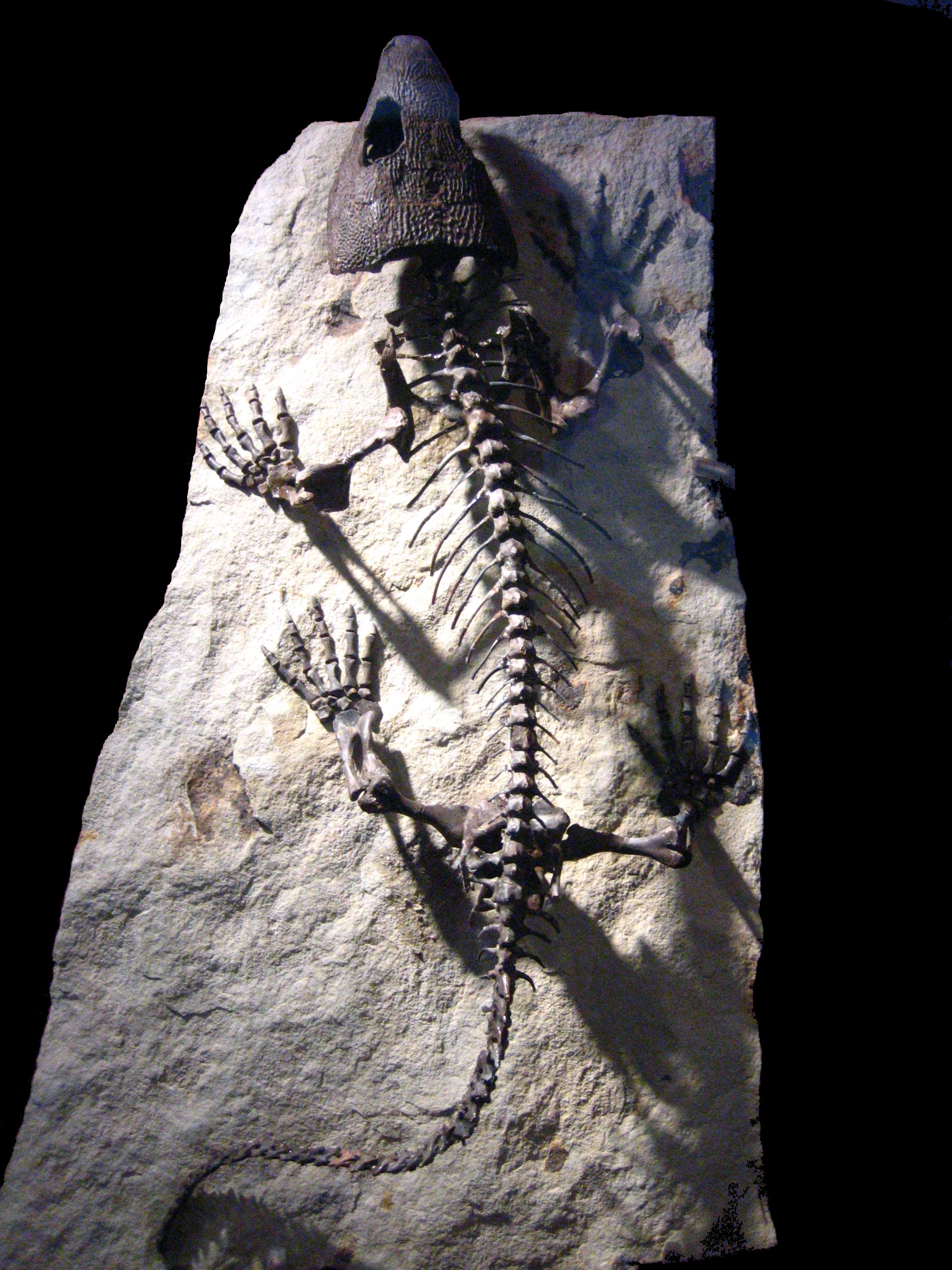
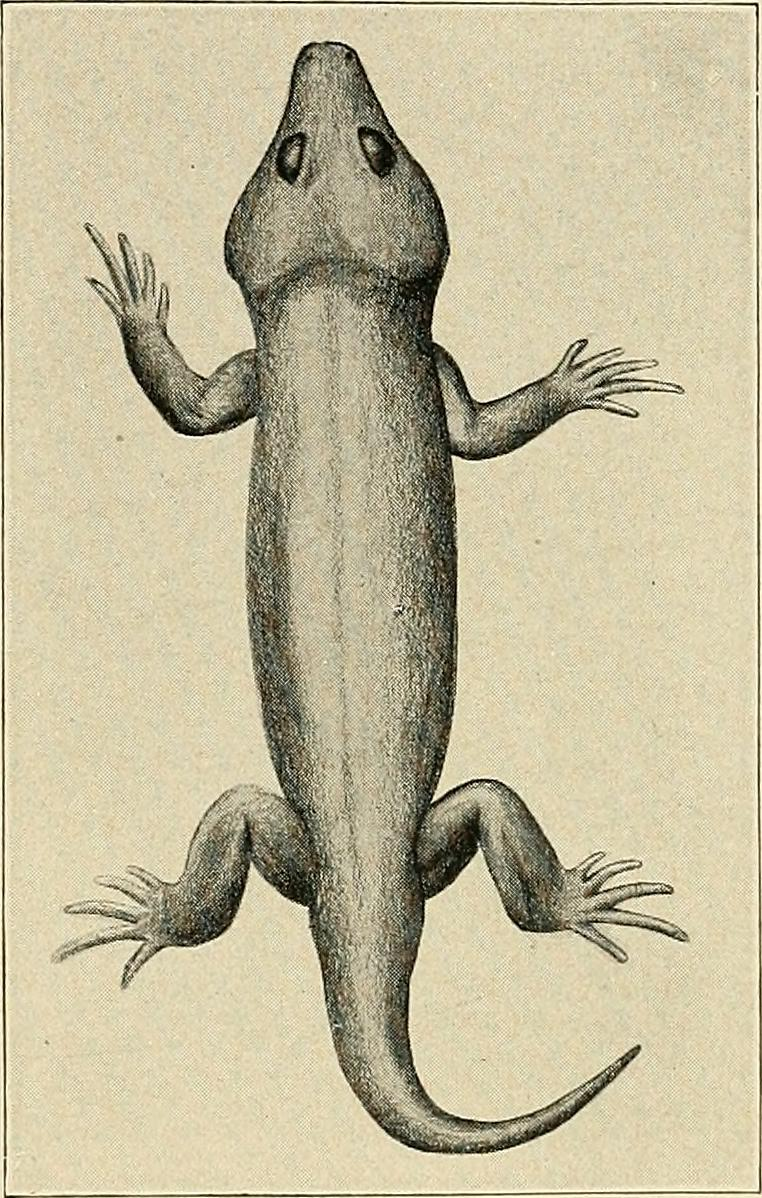
C. aguti: skeleton seen from above (top left), restoration from 1914 (top right), and modern restoration (bottom)

C. aguti was a small captorhinid reptile that lived during the Permian Period 286 MYA to 245 MYA when the continents were still connected as Pangea. An abundance of fossils have been found in Oklahoma, and Texas, including a skull, hindlimb bones, spinal vertebra, ribs, and forelimb bones. The entire skeleton of C. aguti resembles a modern lizard.

Although a subfamily of Captorhinidae, Moradisaurinae, also possessed multiple-tooth-rows, the best-known type species Captorhinus aguti clearly acquired multiple-rowed-teeth independently. In contrast to the teeth rows in moradisaurines, the C. aguti rows are oriented obliquely to the margins, where each row is followed posterolaterally by the next one. The toothed areas of the maxilla and dentary are broader in C. aguti than in single-tooth-rowed captorhinids. C. aguti likely practiced lateralized feeding, as enamel on the teeth of the upper and lower right jaws was more worn down than on the left side.

The vertebral structure in C. aguti is that commonly possessed by primitive reptiles. The centra are amphicoelous and notochordal, with swollen, relatively massive neural arches. The vertebral column is differentiated into presacral, sacral, and postsacral or caudal vertebrae.

Similar to extant reptiles, C. aguti has a functional "mesotarsal" joint. It divides the tarsus into a proximal and distal unit, where the centrale is linked mechanically to the proximal (astragalus-calcaneum) unit. The increased flexibility due to this multiple-jointed arrangement allowed for the articulations between the centrale and first three distal tarsals on the medial side of the mesotarsal joint to have mechanical independence from the lateral articulation between the astragalus-calcaneum and the fourth and fifth distal tarsals. This is almost certainly closely correlated with the primitive sprawling step cycle. Due to the shape of the distal femoral articulation, Captorhinus aguti would have had little capacity to compensate for lateral movement of the femur.

Preserved skin is known from mummified specimens attributed to the species, indicating that they were covered in epidermal scales similar to modern reptiles. Mummified specimens of Captorhinus, probably C. aguti, indicate that they had a cartilaginous sternum and cartilaginous extensions of the cervical ribs and trunk ribs.

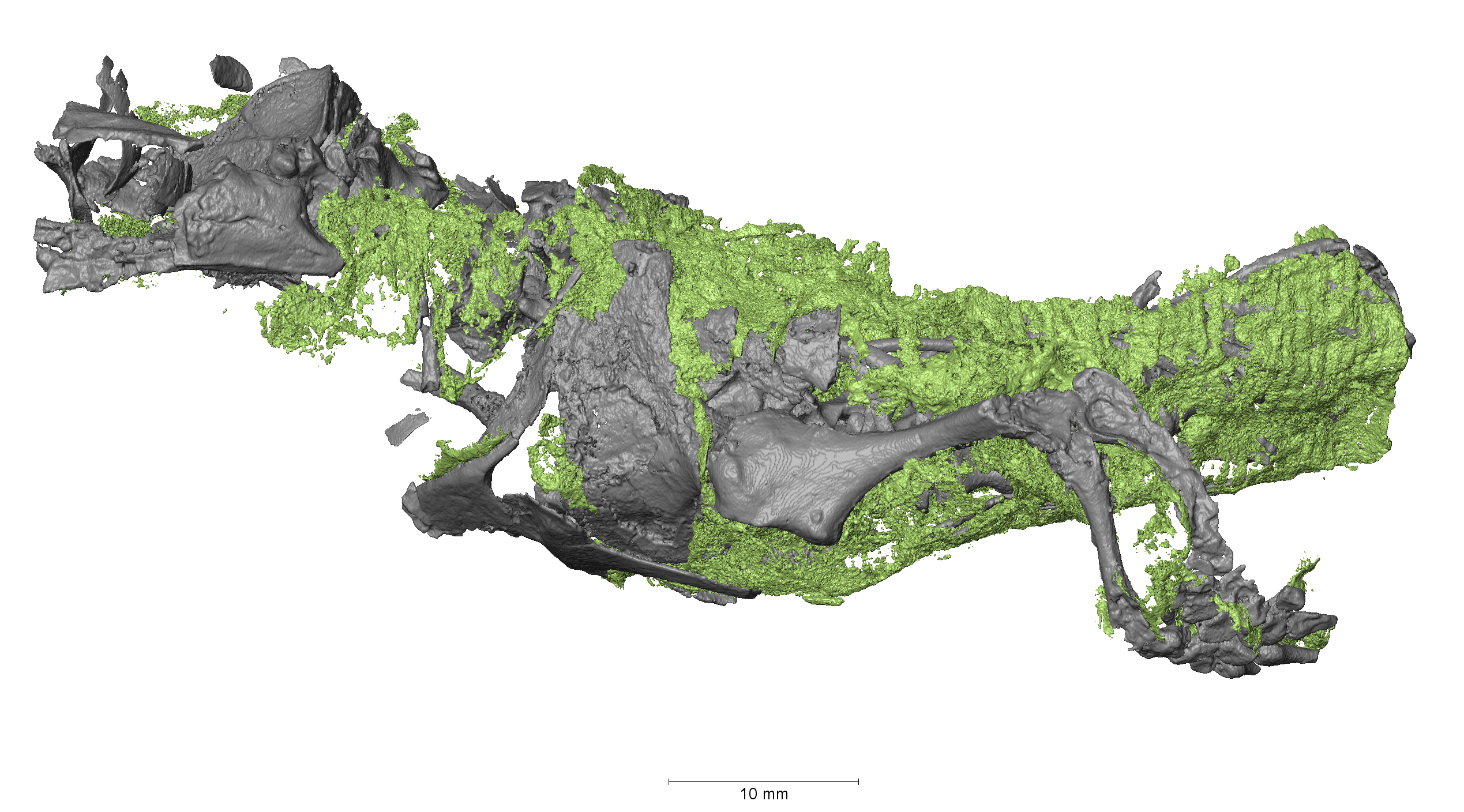
Mummified specimen of C. aguti (ROMVP 88565) showing outermost covering of epidermal scales in green

=== Captorhinus magnus ===
Captorhinus magnus has thus far been identified from only the Richards Spur locality in Oklahoma, a site that also produced the remains of C. aguti. Fossils of C. magnus are found predominately in the deeper regions of the fissure complex, whereas in the upper, younger sediments of the fillings, C. magnus remains are extremely rare. This suggests the ecological replacement of C. magnus by the smaller, multiple-rowed C. aguti during the Early Permian.

The skeletal elements of Captorhinus magnus possess a nearly identical morphology to those elements of Captorhinus aguti, with the lone exception of the size difference. Captorhinus magnus averaged about twice as large as C. aguti. Another important difference between the two species is that the teeth are arranged in a single row. Captorhinus magnus possesses ogival check teeth, where the distal tips of the teeth exhibit a triangular shape when viewed in anterior view. Unlike C. aguti, the femur of C. magnus possesses a concave proximal articular surface in both immature and mature individuals. This allows for distinction between similar-sized femora of C. aguti and C. magnus, regardless of the ontogenetic stage of the individuals preserved. Without the presence of the femur or a tooth-bearing element, it would prove difficult to distinguish between C. magnus and C. aguti, although the two can likely be differentiated with size as the sole criterion.

=== Captorhinus laticeps ===
C. laticeps is distinguished from C. aguti by the lack of multiple tooth rows, but is very similar in all other aspects. Captorhinus laticeps is considerably smaller than C. magnus, and possesses chisel-shaped teeth instead of ogival teeth on the posterior portion of the maxilla and dentary.

=== Other remains ===
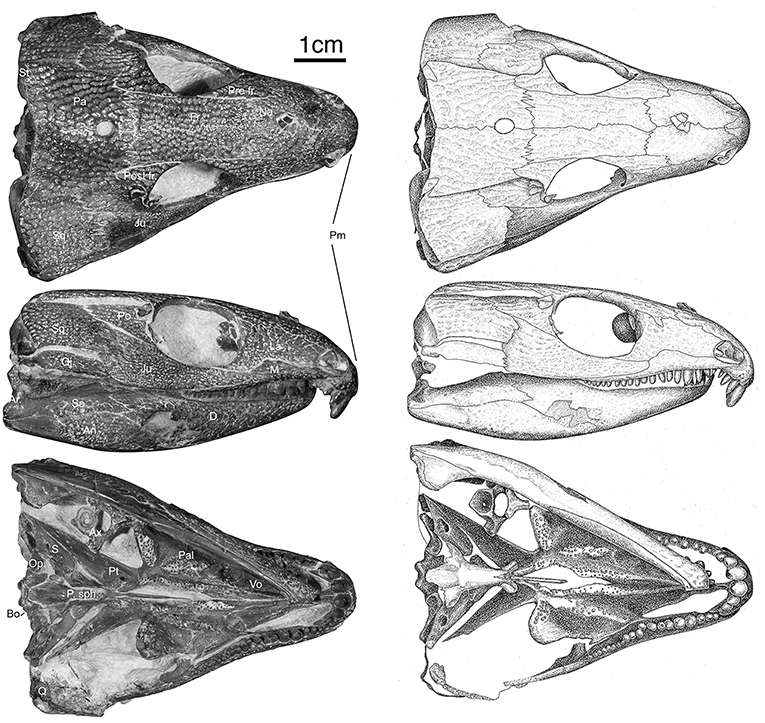
Skull of Captorhinus kierani

Possible remains of Captorhinus have been reported from the Pedra de Fogo Formation, Piauí, Brazil, but they are fragmentary and cannot be assigned to the genus with confidence.

== Paleobiology ==
It is suggested based on its cartilaginous sternum and extensions of the ribs that Captorhinus used the intercostal muscles to breathe similarly to modern lizards as opposed to the buccal breathing utilized by amphibians. Captorhinus has been suggested to be an insectivore or possibly an omnivore. The coeval C. aguti and C. magnus have been suggested to have engaged in niche partitioning, with C. aguti proposed to have consumed more plant matter than C. magnus.

== Paleoecology ==
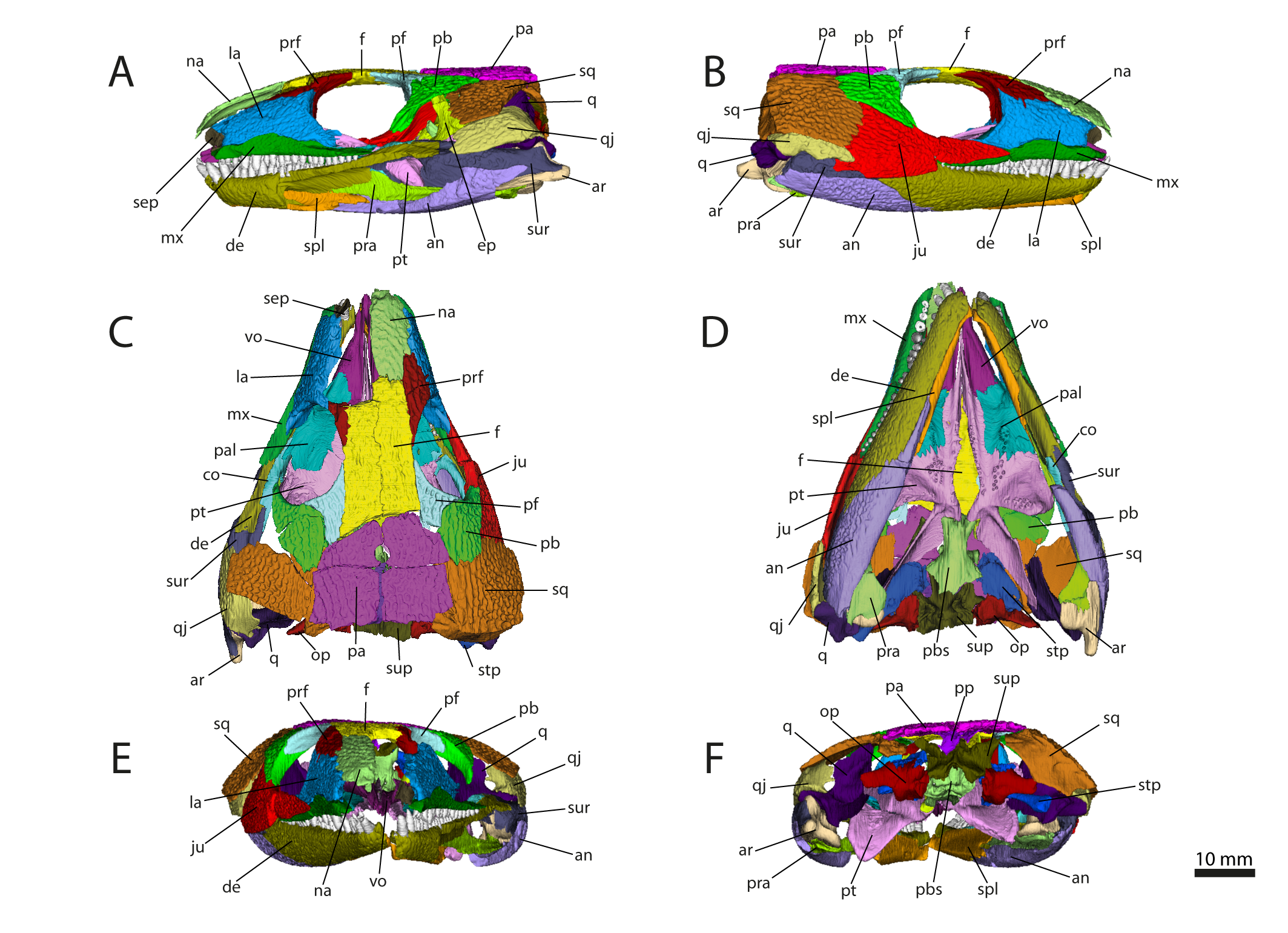
Digital rendering of a skull of Captorhinus aguti (OMNH 44816)

Captorhinus is known from the Admiral, Belle Plains, Clyde, Arroyo, Vale, and possibly the Choza Formations, Lower Permian, of Texas. The genus is also known from the Lower Permian fissure deposits at Richards Spur, Oklahoma, and the Cutler Formation, Rio Arriba County, New Mexico.

== Sources ==
- Fox, Richard C.; Bowman, Merton C. (January 31, 1966). "Osteology and relationships of Captorhinus aguti (Cope) (Reptilia: Captorhinomorpha)". University of Kansas Paleontological Contributions. Vertebrata (Article 11): 1–79. hdl:1808/3815.
- Gaffney, Eugene S.; Mc Kenna, Malcolm C. (October 30, 1979). "A Late Permian Captorhinid from Rhodesia" (PDF). American Museum Novitates (2688): 1–15. Archived from the original (PDF) on April 2, 2015.
- Kissel, Richard A.; Dilkes, David W.; Reisz, Robert R. (September 1, 2002). "Captorhinus magnus, a new captorhinid (Amniota: Eureptilia) from the Lower Permian of Oklahoma, with new evidence on the homology of the astragalus". Canadian Journal of Earth Sciences. 39 (9): 1363–1372. Bibcode:2002CaJES..39.1363K. doi:10.1139/e02-040.
- Holmes, Robert B. (April 1, 2003). "The hind limb of Captohinus aguti and the step cycle of basal amniotes". Canadian Journal of Earth Sciences. 40 (4): 515–526. Bibcode:2003CaJES..40..515H. doi:10.1139/e02-039.
- Modesto, Sean P.; Scott, Diane M.; Berman, David S.; Muller, Johannes; Reisz, Robert R. (February 1, 2007). "The skull and the palaeoecological significance of Labidosaurus hamatus, a captorhinid reptile from the Lower Permian of Texas". Zoological Journal of the Linnean Society. 149 (2): 237–262. doi:10.1111/j.1096-3642.2007.00242.x.
- Seltin, Richard J. (October 22, 1959). "A Review of the Family Captorhinidae". Fieldiana: Geology. 10 (34): 461–505.
- Canoville, Aurore; Laurin, Michel (June 1, 2010). "Evolution of humeral microanatomy and lifestyle in amniotes, and some comments on palaeobiological inferences". Biological Journal of the Linnean Society. 100 (2): 384–406. doi:10.1111/j.1095-8312.2010.01431.x.
- Modesto, S. P. (February 1996). "A Basal Captorhinid Reptile from the Fort Sill Fissures, Lower Permian of Oklahoma". Oklahoma Geology. 56 (1): 4–14.
- Friedman, Gerald M. (February 1996). "A Note on Metamorphism in the World's Deepest Boreholes in Sedimentary Strata: Anadarko Basin, Oklahoma". Oklahoma Geology. 56 (1): 15–17.
