= Arroyo Formation =

Geologic formation in Texas, U.S.

- Stratigraphic range: Kungurian
- Type: Formation
- Unit of: Clear Fork Group
- Underlies: Vale Formation
- Overlies: Waggoner Ranch Formation
- Thickness: 250 ft (76 m)

Lithology
- Primary: Limestone, mudstone
- Other: Gypsum

Location
- Coordinates: 33.8°N 99.2°W
- Approximate paleocoordinates: 0.4°N 29.6°W
- Region: Texas
- Country: United States

Type section
- Named for: Los Arroyos, Runnels County, Texas
- Named by: Beede & Waithe
- Year defined: 1918
- Arroyo Formation (the United States) Arroyo Formation (Texas)

The Arroyo Formation, sometimes termed the Lower Clear Fork Formation, is a geologic formation in Texas. It preserves fossils dating back to the Kungurian stage of the Permian period. It is the lower-most portion of the Clear Fork Group, part of a series of fossiliferous Permian strata in the south-central United States known as the red beds.

== Geology ==
The Arroyo Formation is the oldest and most eastern component of the Clear Fork Group. It extends in a Northeasterly direction from Concho County up as far north as Wilbarger County. North of the Red River in Oklahoma, the equivalent formation is the upper Garber Formation and cave deposits of Richards Spur (formerly Fort Sill).

=== Southern area ===
The Arroyo Formation was first named by Beede and Waite (1918). The type locality was a series of marine limestone, shale, and gypsum deposits cropping out at Los Arroyos (formerly Los Arroyo), a specific arroyo in Runnels County a few miles west of Ballinger. Wrather (1917) observed the same geological sequence in Taylor County, although he named it the Abilene Formation, which was a preoccupied name rejected by Beede and Waite (1918). At first, Beede and Waite (1918) tentatively placed the Arroyo Formation in the Wichita (or Albany) Stage/Group, rather than the overlying Clear Fork Stage/Group. Subsequent authors, starting with Sellars (1932), have considered the Arroyo Formation the basal part of the Clear Fork Group. Olson (1989) called the portion of the Arroyo Formation below the Salt Fork of the Brazos River the "Southern area", contrasting it with the extensively studied "Classic area" further north.

"Southern area" deposits found north of Runnels County preserve a series of terrestrial mudstone layers interspersed with several distinct intervals of marine limestone, four of which having been named. These four limestone intervals are, from stratigraphically lowest to highest, the Rainey, Lytle, Kirby Lake, and Standpipe Limestones. The composition and appearance of these limestones can be variable, with some localities having fine-grained layers and others being practically marine conglomerate. These four limestone layers do not persist in the entirety of the "Southern Area", with the Standpipe Limestone terminating just north of Abilene. This makes it difficult to distinguish the boundary between the Arroyo and Vale Formation north of Taylor County, where it occurs shortly after the top of the Standpipe Limestone.

The limestone layers are often fossiliferous, preserving fossils from both marine organisms and reworked inland fauna. A diverse assortment of palaeoniscoid fish teeth and scales and bivalve shells are by far the most abundant fossils. Worm burrows and ostracods are also very common. Tetrapod remains include Dimetrodon teeth, unusually small "Lysorophus" (Brachydectes) vertebrae, skull fragments from small Diplocaulus and Trimerorhachis, a few Eryops components, and fragments from various microsaurs, possibly referable to Pantylus, Microbrachis, and/or Pelodosotis. Most of the bones belong to small animals, likely due to taphonomic bias due to ease of transportation. This is also a possible reason as for why found teeth from the freshwater lungfish Gnathorhiza, are much smaller and rarer than those from terrestrial deposits. Captorhinus, a common small animal in the "Classic area", is curiously absent. Shark remains include teeth from Orthacanthus and hybodonts. Marine invertebrates mostly belonged to shallow water or estuary niches, apart from a single poorly preserved nautiloid which likely drifted in from more open waters.

Fossils from terrestrial deposits (like stream conglomerate or red mudstone) are rare in the southern area, found at only a handful of sites in Haskell County and southwestern Baylor County. These fossils are probably from a later interval of the Arroyo Formation, a segment which would lie between the Kirby Lake and Standpipe Limestone layers further south. The fauna is similar to that of the "Classic area", with Diplocaulus, Dimetrodon, and Orthacanthus fossils being the most common and Eryops and Diadectes also known, albeit from much more fragmentary remains.

=== Northern ("classic") area ===
Between the Salt Fork Brazos and Red River, the Arroyo Formation preserves a terrestrial floodplain ecosystem found in outcrops in Baylor, Wilbarger, and Wichita counties. This area, which Olson (1989) termed the "Classic area", has been extensively studied for its Permian plant and animal fossils. The portions of the Arroyo Formation exposed in this area are among the oxidized Permian sediments collectively termed the Red Beds of Texas and Oklahoma. They are represented by Red clays, shales, and mudstones, with occasional layers of sandstone or conglomerate, as well as scattered carbonate nodules which become increasingly more common in younger levels. Some of the sandstone layers have been given informal names, such as the Red Tank and Brushy Creek Sandstone Members. Limestone layers are rare relative to the "southern area", and the diagnostic Taylor County layers are seemingly completely absent north of the Salt Fork, although a dolomite layer possibly equivalent to the Rainey or Lytle limestones has been reported. This dolomite layer, informally named the Craddock dolomite, has been known to preserve plant impressions as well as arthropod and tetrapod footprints.

With the absence of the characteristic Standpipe Limestone of the "southern area", Arroyo red beds in the "classic area" are difficult to differentiate from the overlying Vale Formation on a purely geological basis. A similar issue obscures the boundary between the Vale and Choza Formations, with the absence of the Bullwagon Dolomite which separates the two further south. As a result, sedimentologists generally do not distinguish the component formations of the Clear Fork Group, and simply prefer to call these northern red beds the Clear Fork Formation. Under this system, the Arroyo Formation would be roughly equivalent to the informal "Lower Clear Fork Formation".

Olson (1958) attempted to provide an informal geological boundary between the Arroyo and Vale based on the presence of an even red shale or mudstone layer. This layer is found along a northeastern-oriented line that bisected the Clear Fork area in the western part of Baylor County. This even layer, he argued, was formed by slow, brackish streams in a lowland delta close to sea level. Therefore, their presence may have been a result of the same marine transgression responsible for the Standpipe Limestone further south. Under this hypothesis, the Vale Formation could be found in stratigraphically higher areas west of the line, and the Arroyo formation would be east of the line. Nevertheless, Olson admitted that this boundary was imprecise due to the variable depth of the shales and the varying topography of the surrounding landscape.

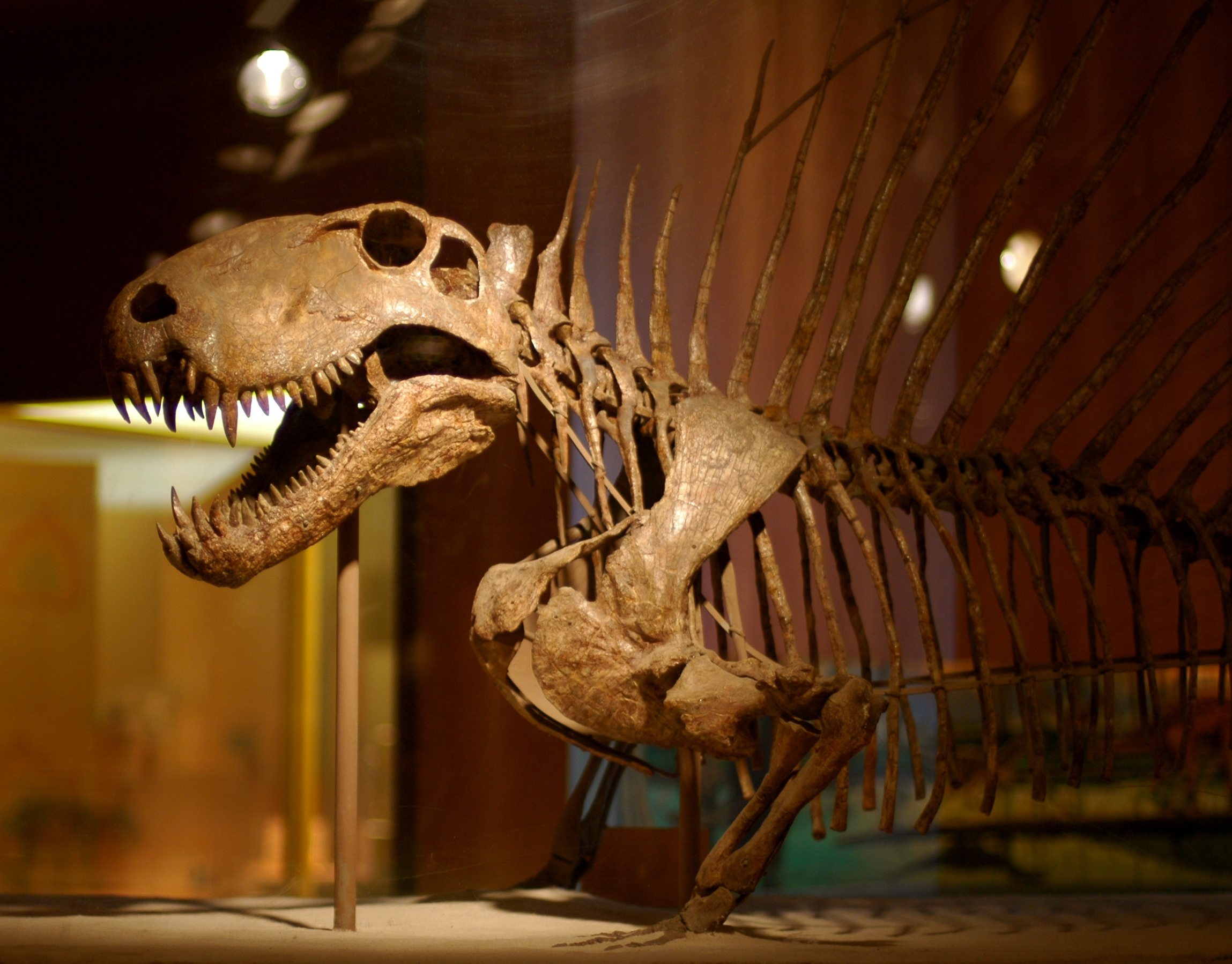
A skeleton of Dimetrodon grandis found at the Craddock bonebed on display at the National Museum of Natural History

The "classic area" of the Arroyo Formation is one of the most fossiliferous parts of the Texas Red Beds, and it is typically differentiated from surrounding formations by paleontologists on the basis of faunal differences. A large number of sites are known bearing either abundant plant or animal remains. The animal-bearing sites are among the most diverse Early Permian tetrapod assemblages in the world, with numerous remains of amphibians, pelycosaurs (mammal relatives), chondrichthyans (sharks), and eureptiles. The last and largest known species of edaphosaurid, Edaphosaurus pogonias, is known from the Arroyo, with the family going extinct soon afterwards. Other pelycosaurs, including Secodontosaurus, Varanosaurus, and several species of Dimetrodon, were abundant, though the abundance of Dimetrodon was retained in the Vale and Choza Formations. Captorhinids were the most common eureptiles in the Arroyo, represented by basal taxa such as Captorhinus and Labidosaurus. Captorhinids experienced a taxonomic turnover at the beginning of the Vale Formation, as advanced taxa like Labidosaurikos and Captorhinikos replace or evolve from the more primitive captorhinids soon after the red shale boundary between the two formations. The first specimens of the gracile eureptile Araeoscelis were discovered at the Craddock Bonebed, one of the most productive Arroyo Formation sites in Baylor County. Aquatic amphibians like Diplocaulus, Trimerorhachis, and Eryops are common. Terrestrial amphibians like Seymouria, Diadectes, microsaurs, and various dissorophoids (Acheloma, Broiliellus, Aspidosaurus, etc.) were present as well. Many of these terrestrial amphibians did not survive into the Vale Formation. Burrows containing aestivating Brachydectes, Gnathorhiza, and Diplocaulus are common in the middle part of the Arroyo Formation, likely indicating a period with a drier climate than the early or late Arroyo. The most common shark remains belong to Orthacanthus platypternus, although teeth from Xenacanthus luederensis are also known from some early Arroyo sites.

== Paleobiota ==
=== "Lepospondyls" ===
Color key: Taxon / Reclassified taxon / Taxon falsely reported as present / Dubious taxon or junior synonym / Ichnotaxon / Ootaxon / Morphotaxon

Notes
Uncertain or tentative taxa are in small text
~~crossed out~~ taxa are discredited.

| Genus | Species | Notes | Images |
|---|---|---|---|
| Brachydectes | B. elongatus | A lysorophian common in some sites. Historically referred to Lysorophus tricarinatus. | Brachydectes Diplocaulus Pelodosotis |
| Cardiocephalus | C. sternbergi | A gymnarthrid microsaur | Brachydectes Diplocaulus Pelodosotis |
| Crossotelos | C. annulatus | A urocordylid nectridean. | Brachydectes Diplocaulus Pelodosotis |
| Diplocaulus | D. brevirostris | Rare | Brachydectes Diplocaulus Pelodosotis |
| Diplocaulus | D. copei | Indeterminate, likely a junior synonym of D. magnicornis | Brachydectes Diplocaulus Pelodosotis |
| Diplocaulus | D. limbatus | Junior synonym of D. magnicornis | Brachydectes Diplocaulus Pelodosotis |
| Diplocaulus | D. magnicornis | An abundant diplocaulid nectridean | Brachydectes Diplocaulus Pelodosotis |
| Diplocaulus | D. primigenius | May be synonymous with D. magnicornis | Brachydectes Diplocaulus Pelodosotis |
| Euryodus | E. primus | A gymnarthrid microsaur | Brachydectes Diplocaulus Pelodosotis |
| Goniocara | G. willistoni | An indeterminate gymnarthrid microsaur known from skull fragments. Initially named Goniocephalus. | Brachydectes Diplocaulus Pelodosotis |
| Gymnarthrus | G. willoughbyi | Junior synonym of Cardiocephalus sternbergi. | Brachydectes Diplocaulus Pelodosotis |
| Micraroter | M. erythrogeois | An ostodolepid microsaur which may have been present based on BPI 3839, a well-preserved skull and skeleton potentially referable to the genus. | Brachydectes Diplocaulus Pelodosotis |
| Ostodolepis | O. brevispinatus | An ostodolepid microsaur | Brachydectes Diplocaulus Pelodosotis |
| Pantylus | P. coicodus | A fragmentary microsaur. May be synonymous with Pantylus cordatus, or completely unrelated. | Brachydectes Diplocaulus Pelodosotis |
| Pelodosotis | P. elongatum | An ostodolepid microsaur | Brachydectes Diplocaulus Pelodosotis |
| Permoplatyops | P. parvus | Also known as Diplocaulus pusillus and Platyops parvus. Junior synonym of Diplocaulus magnicornis. | Brachydectes Diplocaulus Pelodosotis |
| Quasicaecilia | Q. texana | A brachystelechid microsaur. Type locality unknown, may be from the Arroyo Formation. | Brachydectes Diplocaulus Pelodosotis |

=== Temnospondyls ===
| Genus | Species | Notes | Images |
|---|---|---|---|
| Acheloma | A. cumminsi | A trematopid | Acheloma cumminsi Eryops megacephalus Cacops aspidephorus |
| Acheloma | A. willistoni | A trematopid | Acheloma cumminsi Eryops megacephalus Cacops aspidephorus |
| Acheloma | A. casei | Junior synonym of Isodectes obtusus | Acheloma cumminsi Eryops megacephalus Cacops aspidephorus |
| Alegeinosaurus | A. aphthitos | Junior synonym of Aspidosaurus chiton | Acheloma cumminsi Eryops megacephalus Cacops aspidephorus |
| Aspidosaurus | A. chiton | A dissorophid | Acheloma cumminsi Eryops megacephalus Cacops aspidephorus |
| Aspidosaurus | A. peltatus | Junior synonym of Dissorophus multicinctus | Acheloma cumminsi Eryops megacephalus Cacops aspidephorus |
| Broiliellus | B. arroyoensis | A dissorophid | Acheloma cumminsi Eryops megacephalus Cacops aspidephorus |
| Cacops | C. aspidephorus | A dissorophid | Acheloma cumminsi Eryops megacephalus Cacops aspidephorus |
| Dasyceps | D. micropthalmus | A zatrachydid | Acheloma cumminsi Eryops megacephalus Cacops aspidephorus |
| Dissorophus | D. multicinctus | A dissorophid | Acheloma cumminsi Eryops megacephalus Cacops aspidephorus |
| Eobrachyops | E. townendae | Junior synonym of Isodectes obtusus | Acheloma cumminsi Eryops megacephalus Cacops aspidephorus |
| Eryops | E. megacephalus | A common eryopid | Acheloma cumminsi Eryops megacephalus Cacops aspidephorus |
| Isodectes | I. obtusus | A dvinosaur | Acheloma cumminsi Eryops megacephalus Cacops aspidephorus |
| Isodectes | I. megalops | Junior synonym of Isodectes obtusus | Acheloma cumminsi Eryops megacephalus Cacops aspidephorus |
| Kermitops | K. gratus | An amphibamiform | Acheloma cumminsi Eryops megacephalus Cacops aspidephorus |
| Nanobamus | N. macrorhinus | An amphibamiform | Acheloma cumminsi Eryops megacephalus Cacops aspidephorus |
| Trimerorhachis | T. insignis | A common dvinosaur | Acheloma cumminsi Eryops megacephalus Cacops aspidephorus |
| Trimerorhachis | T. mesops | Rare | Acheloma cumminsi Eryops megacephalus Cacops aspidephorus |
| Trimerorhachis | T. conangulus | Junior synonym of Isodectes obtusus | Acheloma cumminsi Eryops megacephalus Cacops aspidephorus |
| Trimerorhachis | T. greggi | May be descended from T. insignis | Acheloma cumminsi Eryops megacephalus Cacops aspidephorus |

=== Seymouriamorphs ===
| Genus | Species | Notes | Images |
|---|---|---|---|
| Desmospondylus | D. anomalus | Junior synonym of Seymouria baylorensis | Seymouria baylorensis |
| Seymouria | S. baylorensis | | Seymouria baylorensis |

=== Diadectomorphs ===
| Genus | Species | Notes | Images |
|---|---|---|---|
| Diadectes | D. tenuitectens | A diadectid | Diadectes |

=== Synapsids ===
| Genus | Species | Notes | Images |
|---|---|---|---|
| Casea | C. broilii | A caseid | |
| Dimetrodon | D. giganhomogenes | A sphenacodontid | |
| Dimetrodon | D. grandis | A sphenacodontid | |
| Dimetrodon | D. kempae | Dubious | |
| Dimetrodon | D. loomisi | A sphenacodontid | |
| Edaphosaurus | E. pogonias | An edaphosaurid | |
| Secodontosaurus | S. obtusidens | A sphenacodontid | |
| Tetraceratops | T. insignis | An advanced pelycosaur or early therapsid | |
| Trichasaurus | T. texensis | A caseid | |
| Varanops | V. brevirostris | A varanopid | |
| Varanosaurus | V. acutirostris | An ophiacodontid | |

=== Sauropsids ===
| Genus | Species | Notes | Images |
|---|---|---|---|
| Araeoscelis | A. grandis | An araeoscelidian | |

=== Captorhinids ===
| Genus | Species | Notes | Images |
|---|---|---|---|
| Captorhinus | C. aguti | A captorhinid | |
| Ectocynodon | E. incisivus | Junior synonym of Captorhinus aguti. Has also been referred to the microsaur Pariotichus and the captorhinid Labidosaurus. | |
| Labidosaurus | A. hamatus | A captorhinid | |

=== Fish ===
Apart from sharks and lungfish, a large and well-preserved actinopterygian fish, Brachydegma caelatum, is known from the lower Clear Fork Formation.

== See also ==
- List of fossiliferous stratigraphic units in Texas
- Paleontology in Texas
