= Parioxys =

Parioxys Temporal range: Early Permian

Scientific classification
- Kingdom: Animalia
- Phylum: Chordata
- Clade: Tetrapoda
- Order: †Temnospondyli
- Family: †Parioxyidae; Moustafa, 1955
- Genus: †Parioxys; Cope, 1878

Species
- †P. ferricolus Cope, 1878 (type); †P. bolli? Carroll, 1964

Extinct genus of amphibians

Parioxys is an extinct genus of temnospondyl amphibian from the Early Permian of Texas.

== History of study ==
The type species, Parioxys ferricolus, was named in 1878 by American paleontologist Edward Drinker Cope based on two badly preserved skulls were collected from the early Permian Texas red beds. Both skulls were collected in the same year from Mount Barry, a site in the Petrolia Formation (formerly "Belle Plains Formation") of Wichita County, Texas. They are now stored in the American Museum of Natural History (AMNH). One of the P. ferricolus skulls, AMNH 4309, has frequently been conflated with AMNH 4310, a slightly larger Eryops skull ("Eryops anatinus") collected from Wichita County in 1880. The other P. ferricolus skull is designated AMNH 2445.

Over the course of several papers in 1952 and 1955, Egyptian paleontologist Youssef S. Moustafa redescribed Cope's skulls along with new material from additional localities in Texas. AMNH 4309 was designated as the holotype of P. ferricolus. One of the new specimens, MCZ 1162, was collected from Baylor County in 1934. MCZ 1162 consists of a large block containing fossils from at least eight individuals, including four skulls and numerous postcranial bones.

Further preparation of P. ferricolus skull material allowed a redescription by Schoch & Sues (2022). Moustafa described a second species, P. romeri, on the basis of an isolated humerus, but this was regarded as being indeterminate. Another proposed species, Parioxys bolli, was named and described by Canadian paleontologist Robert Carroll in 1964. This species is only known from postcranial fragments from the Archer City Formation of Archer County. Some sources have suggested that P. bolli is an unrelated species of temnospondyl, possibly a trematopid close to Ecolsonia cutlerensis.

== Relationships ==
Parioxys was historically considered to be closely related to eryopoids, more specifically the well-known Eryops megalocephalus. Eryops fossils have been collected from the same locality as the type material of P. ferricolus. Subsequent to his original description, Cope listed P. ferricolus as a species of Eryops, possibly because he considered it to be a juvenile specimen of Eryops.

In 1911, Parioxys was revived as a distinct genus with a suggestion that the original specimens described by Cope might have been inadvertently described as other taxa by later authors. Its affinities continued to be debated, with some suggestions that it might instead belong to the Trematopidae. Moustafa (1955) placed Parioxys in its own family and suggested that it was related to the Dissorophidae. Schoch & Milner (2014) placed Parioxys within Dissorophidae based on personal observations of further preparation of historic material, although at the time this suggestion was not tested via a phylogenetic analysis, due to the poor quality of much of the material.

The revision by Schoch & Sues (2022) finally tested the position of P. ferricolus in a dissorophoid-oriented phylogenetic matrix. They recovered it as a eucacopine dissorophid, most closely related to Kamacops from the Middle Permian of Russia. They list the following features as features shared between this species and Kamacops and not with Cacops: (1) smaller interpterygoid vacuities, resulting from the medial expansion of palatine and pterygoid (condition more extreme in K. acervalis); (2) the enlarged vomer with the posteriorly elongated, slit-like choana; and (3) the absence of an internarial fenestra.
