= Waggoner Ranch Formation =

Geologic formation in northern Texas, United States

- Stratigraphic range: Artinskian-Kungurian; ~290–268 Ma
- Type: Formation
- Unit of: Wichita Group
- Underlies: Arroyo Formation
- Overlies: Petrolia Formation

Lithology
- Primary: Limestone
- Other: Claystone

Location
- Coordinates: 34.0°N 99.0°W
- Approximate paleocoordinates: 2.2°N 28.5°W
- Region: Texas
- Country: United States
- Waggoner Ranch Formation (the United States) Waggoner Ranch Formation (Texas)

The Waggoner Ranch Formation is a geologic formation in northern Texas. It preserves fossils dating back to the Artinskian to Kungurian stages of the Permian period.

== Fossil content ==
The following fossils have been uncovered from the formation:

Synapsids

- Dimetrodon limbatus
- Glaucosaurus megalops
- Mycterosaurus longiceps
- Ophiacodon major
- Secodontosaurus obtusidens
- Varanosaurus wichitaensis
- Dimetrodon sp.
- Ophiacodon sp.

Temnospondyls

- Broiliellus texensis
- Eryops megacephalus
- Eryops sp.
- Trimerorhachis sp.

Reptiles

- Araeoscelis casei
- Captorhinus aguti
- C. laticeps
- Pantylus cordatus
- Protocaptorhinus cf. pricei
- Reiszorhinus olsoni
- Captorhinus sp.

Cotylosauria

- Diadectes sideropelicus
- Diadectes sp.

Amphibians

- Diplocaulus sp.

== See also ==
- List of fossiliferous stratigraphic units in Texas
- Paleontology in Texas
