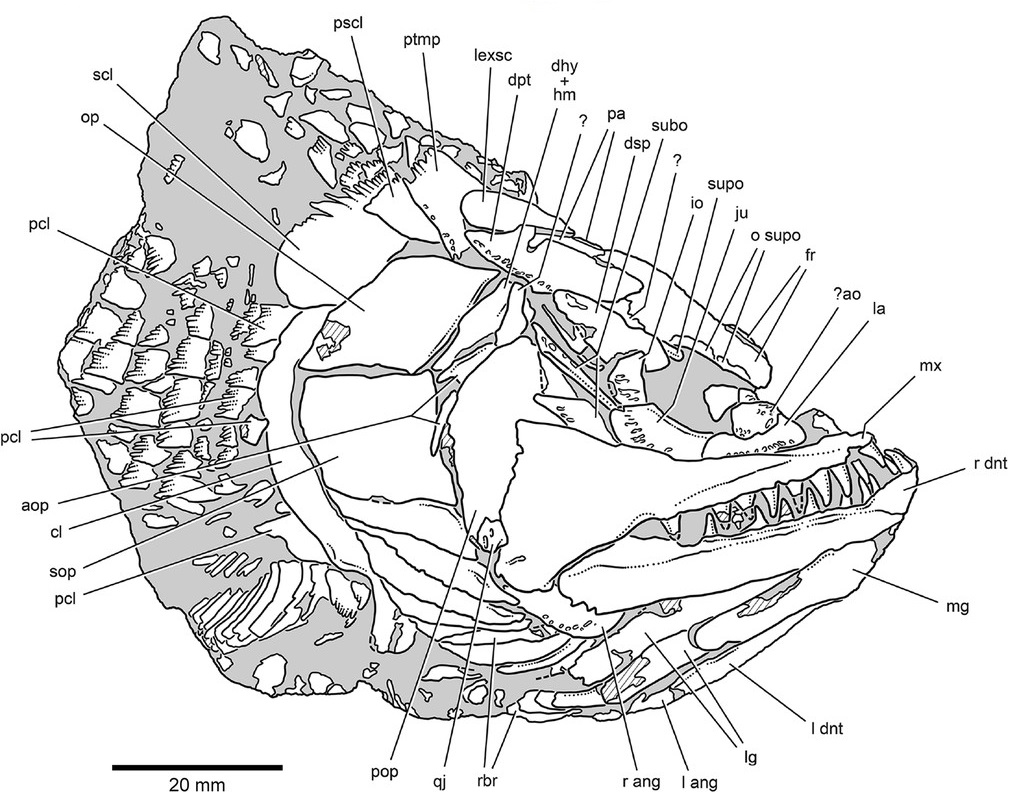
- Interpretive drawing of the skull of the holotype of Brachydegma caelatum

Scientific classification
- Kingdom: Animalia
- Phylum: Chordata
- Class: Actinopterygii
- Order: incertae sedis
- Family: incertae sedis
- Genus: †Brachydegma; Dunkle, 1939
- Species: †B. caelatum

Binomial name
- †Brachydegma caelatum Dunkle, 1939

= Brachydegma =

Brachydegma Temporal range: Leonardian 279.5–272.5 Ma

Extinct genus of fishes

Brachydegma is an extinct genus of prehistoric freshwater ray-finned fish that lived during the Leonardian age (Cisuralian/lower Permian) in what is now Texas, United States. It is known from two fossils, which were recovered from the Clear Fork Formation. A potential record is also known from the concurrent Hennessey Formation of Oklahoma. It is one of the only fossil ray-finned fish from the Permian that preserves the skull bones in three dimensions.

== Classification ==
Brachydegma was first considered a "palaeoniscid". A later study rather suggested that Brachydegma could be one of the earliest crown neopterygians (Halecomorphi) known from the fossil record. However, this view relied on misinterpretations of cranial features. A more recent study yielded conflicting placements of Brachydegma on the actinopterygian tree of life, rendering its placement in an order or family difficult. It appears to be closely related or possibly a member of the crown group of Actinopterygii, though a closer relationship with either Neopterygii or Polypteriformes appears plausible.

== See also ==
- Prehistoric fish
- List of prehistoric bony fish
