= Waggoneria =

Waggoneria Temporal range: Early Permian

Scientific classification
- Kingdom: Animalia
- Phylum: Chordata
- Order: †Seymouriamorpha
- Family: †Waggoneriidae; Olson, 1951
- Genus: †Waggoneria; Olson, 1951

Species
- †W. knoxensis Olson, 1951 (type)

Extinct genus of tetrapodomorphs

Waggoneria is a genus of seymouriamorph from the Early Permian of Texas. It was named by American paleontologist Everett C. Olson in 1951 on the basis of a holotype fossil that included a weathered skull, lower jaws, vertebrae, and part of the pectoral girdle. The type and only species is W. knoxensis. A new family, Waggoneriidae, was also erected for the specimen.

The fossil was discovered in a conglomerated deposit of the Early Permian Vale Formation near the town of Vera in Knox County, Texas. The specimen was found in a nodule of rock that had broken, and much of the surface of the skull had weathered away.

Because Waggoneria is known from a single fragmentary fossil, few features distinguish it from other reptiliomorphs. One distinction can be seen in the structure of the jaws. The surfaces of the upper and lower jaws are plate-like and contain several rows of teeth. The lower jaw is deep, possibly associated with the crushing function of the teeth. Olson only tentatively assigned Waggoneria to Seymouriamorpha, noting other similarities with diadectomorphs and procolophonians. Several other fossils found from the Vale Formation share similar features with Waggoneria but differ slightly in size and morphological detail. Olson suggested that they may represent additional genera within Waggoneriidae.
