= Pease River Group =

- Stratigraphic range: Guadalupian
- Type: Group
- Sub-units: San Angelo Formation
- Underlies: Whitehorse Formation
- Overlies: Clear Fork Group

Location
- Region: Texas
- Country: United States

The Pease River Group is a geologic group in Texas Red Beds. It preserves fossils dating back to the Permian period, including some of the geologically most recent continental and coastal vertebrates of the Permian in North America. These are preserved in the San Angelo Formation, which is probably of early Roadian age. They include several fragmentary fossils that Everett C. Olson interpreted as the earliest therapsids, an interpretation that has not been widely accepted.

== See also ==
- List of fossiliferous stratigraphic units in Texas
- Paleontology in Texas
