= Clear Fork Group =

Geologic group in Texas, United States

- Stratigraphic range: Artinskian–Kungurian
- Type: Group
- Sub-units: Arroyo Formation, Vale Formation, Choza Formation
- Underlies: Pease River Group
- Overlies: Wichita Group

Location
- Region: Texas
- Country: United States

The Clear Fork Group is a geologic group in the Texas Red Beds. It preserves fossils dating back to the Permian period.

== See also ==
- List of fossiliferous stratigraphic units in Texas
- Paleontology in Texas
