= Petrolia Formation =

Geologic formation in Texas, United States

- Stratigraphic range: Permian
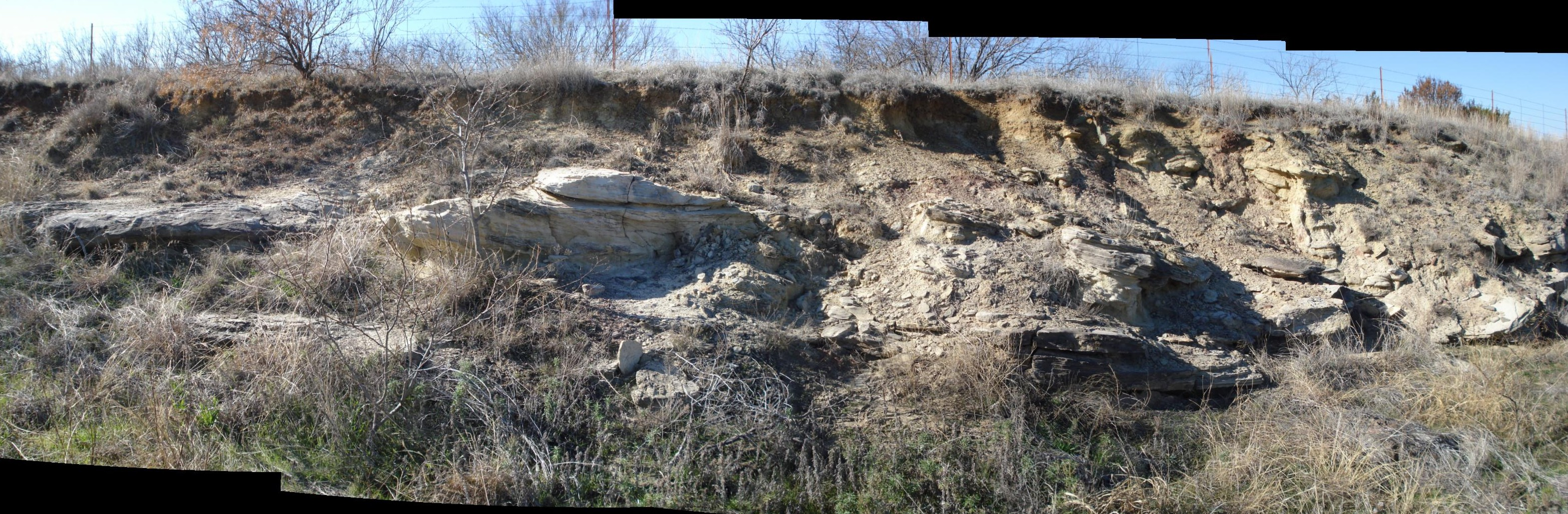
- Outcrops of the Petrolia Formation
- Type: Formation
- Unit of: Wichita Group
- Underlies: Waggoner Ranch Formation
- Overlies: Nocona Formation

Location
- Region: Texas
- Country: United States

The Petrolia Formation is a geologic formation in Texas. It preserves fossils dating back to the Permian period.

== Paleontology ==
The Petrolia Formation has provided a rich vertebrate fauna. Many fossils were originally assigned to the Belle Plains Formation, although this formation is now considered synonymous with the Petrolia Formation. It is regarded as Early Leonardian in age based on ammonite biostratigraphy. Tit Mountain was once regarded as part of the now defunct Belle Plains Formation.

Synapsids of the Petrolia Formation
Genus	Localities	Species	
Dimetrodon	Tit Mountain Tit Mountain	D.natalis D.limbatus	A small species of Dimetrodon. Large species of Dimetrodon.
Secodontosaurus	Tit Mountain	S. obtusidens	A sphenacodontid.
Ophiacodon	Tit Mountain	O.retroversus	An ophiacodontid.
Edaphosaurus	Tit Mountain	E.cruciger	An edaphosaurid.
Eothyris	Tit Mountain	E.parkeyi	A primitive synapsid.
Varanosaurus	Tit Mountain	V.wichitaensis	A varanopid.
Lupeosaurus	Tit Mountain	L. kayi	An edaphosaurid.
Ctenospondylus		C. casei	A sphenacodontid.

=== Chondricthyes ===
Cartilaginous Fish of the Petrolia Formation
Genus	Species	Notes
Orthacanthus	O.platypternus	A xenacanthid.
Barbclabornia	B.luederensis	A giant xencanth.

=== Amphibia ===
Amphibians of the Petrolia Formation
Genus	Species	Notes
Zatrachys	Z.sp	A temnospondyl.
Archeria	A.sp.	An embolomere.
Trimerorhachis	T.bilobatus	A dvinosaur.
Eryops	E.sp.	A temnospondyl.
Parioxys	P. sp.	A temnospondyl.

=== Reptiliomorpha ===
Reptiliomorphs of the Petrolia Formation
Genus	Species	Notes
Diadectes	D.sp.	A diadectid.

== See also ==
- List of fossiliferous stratigraphic units in Texas
- Paleontology in Texas
