= Ermine Cowles Case =

American paleontologist (1871–1953)

- Born: 1871
- Died: 1953
- Other name: E.C. Case
- Education: University of Kansas; University of Chicago (PhD)
- Scientific career
- Fields: Paleontology

Ermine Cowles Case (September 11, 1871 – 1953), invariably known as E.C. Case, was a prominent American paleontologist in the second generation that succeeded Othniel Charles Marsh and Edward Drinker Cope. A graduate of the University of Kansas, with a PhD from the University of Chicago (1896), Case became a paleontologist of international stature while working at the University of Michigan. He was a Member of the American Philosophical Society (1931).

Case began by sorting out some of the taxonomic synonymies and other puzzles created by the "Bone Wars" of the two giants of the age of dinosaur-hunting in the American West, in a series of three monographs dealing with the vertebrates of the Permian or Permo-Carboniferous of North America. He then turned to his lifelong interest, filling in the fossil record of Permian and Carboniferous vertebrates from the Red Beds of Texas, New Mexico, and Oklahoma. He also made extensive Jurassic collections at Como Bluff, Wyoming, in the Cretaceous deposits in Kansas, and Cenozoic formations of the Green River Basin and the Badlands of South Dakota. Among Case's prolific output, several monographs about Permo-Carboniferous vertebrates stand out: Revision of the Amphibia and Pisces of the Permian of North America (1911)), The Permo-Carboniferous Red Beds of North America and their Vertebrate Fauna (1915), The Environment of Vertebrate Life in the Late Paleozoic in North America, a paleographic study (1919), and Environment of Tetrapod Life in the Late Paleozoic of Regions Other than North America (1926). All were published by the Carnegie Institution, Washington D.C.

The Ermine Cowles Case Collegiate Professor of Paleontology is an endowed chair at the University of Michigan, which conserves Case's extensive collections. The Ermine Cowles Case Memorial Lecture is given there annually.
