= Sagenodus =

Sagenodus Temporal range: Late Carboniferous - Early Permian

Scientific classification
- Domain: Eukaryota
- Kingdom: Animalia
- Phylum: Chordata
- Clade: Sarcopterygii
- Class: Dipnoi
- Genus: †Sagenodus; Owen, 1867

Extinct genus of fishes

Sagenodus ("seine tooth") is an extinct genus of prehistoric lungfish. It is a lungfish from the Permo-Carboniferous period found in Europe and North America.

== See also ==
- Sarcopterygii
- List of sarcopterygians
- List of prehistoric bony fish
