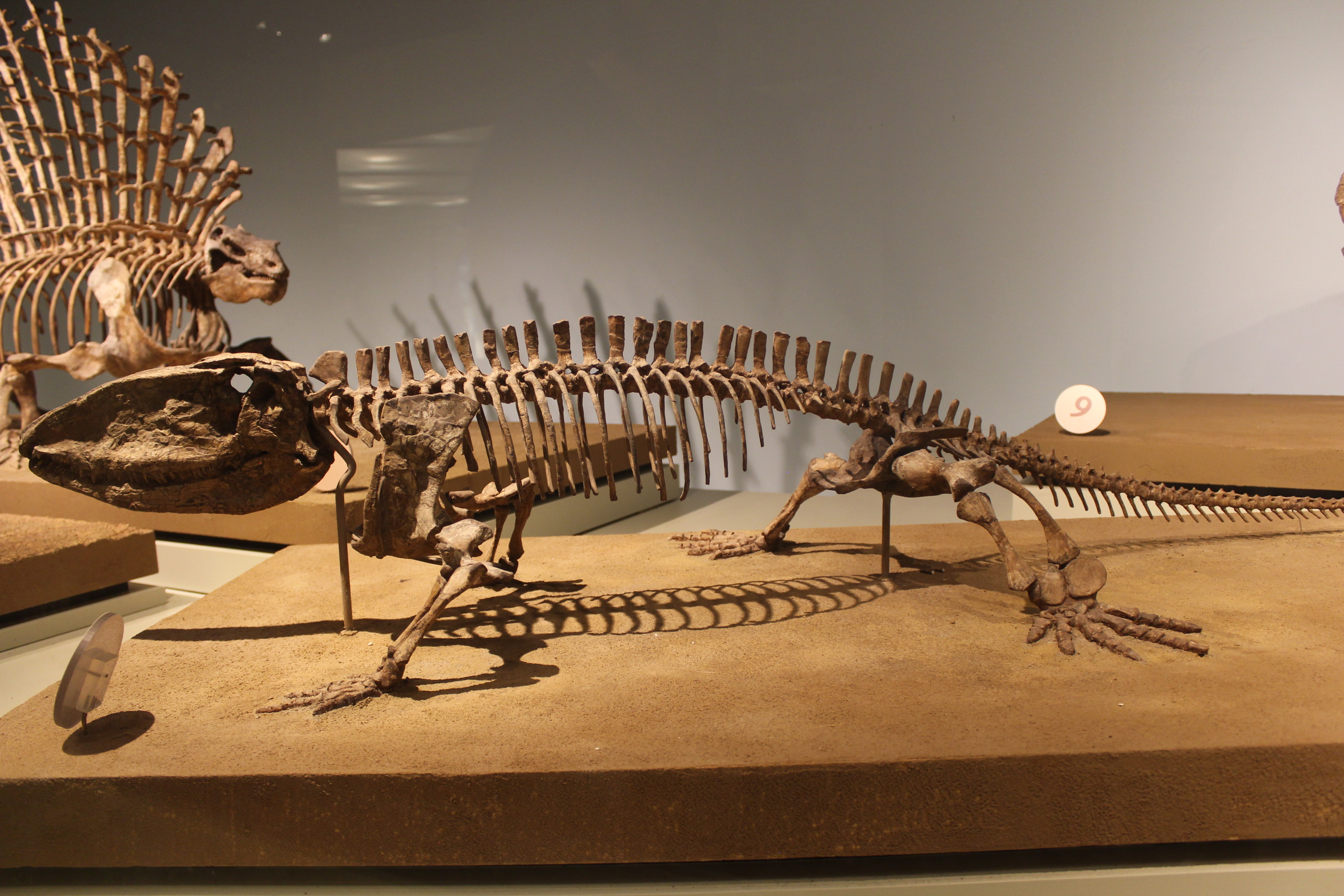
- Skeleton of O. mirus in the Field Museum of Natural History, Chicago

Scientific classification
- Domain: Eukaryota
- Kingdom: Animalia
- Phylum: Chordata
- Clade: Synapsida
- Family: †Ophiacodontidae
- Genus: †Ophiacodon; Marsh, 1878

Type species
- †Ophiacodon mirus Marsh, 1878

Other species
- †O. hilli Romer, 1925; †O. major Romer & Price, 1940; †O. navajovicus (Case, 1907 [originally Dimetrodon navajovicus]); †O. retroversus Cope, 1878; †O. uniformis Cope, 1878

Synonyms
- Arribasaurus; Dinopeles; Diopaeus; Poliosaurus; Theropleura; Therosaurus Huene, 1925 (preoccupied); Winfeldia

= Ophiacodon =

Ophiacodon Temporal range: Late Carboniferous to Early Permian 306–280 Ma

Extinct genus of synapsids

Ophiacodon (meaning "snake tooth") is an extinct genus of synapsid belonging to the family Ophiacodontidae that lived from the Late Carboniferous to the Early Permian in North America and Europe. The genus was named along with its type species O. mirus by paleontologist Othniel Charles Marsh in 1878 and currently includes five other species. As an ophiacodontid, Ophiacodon is one of the most basal synapsids and is close to the evolutionary line leading to mammals.

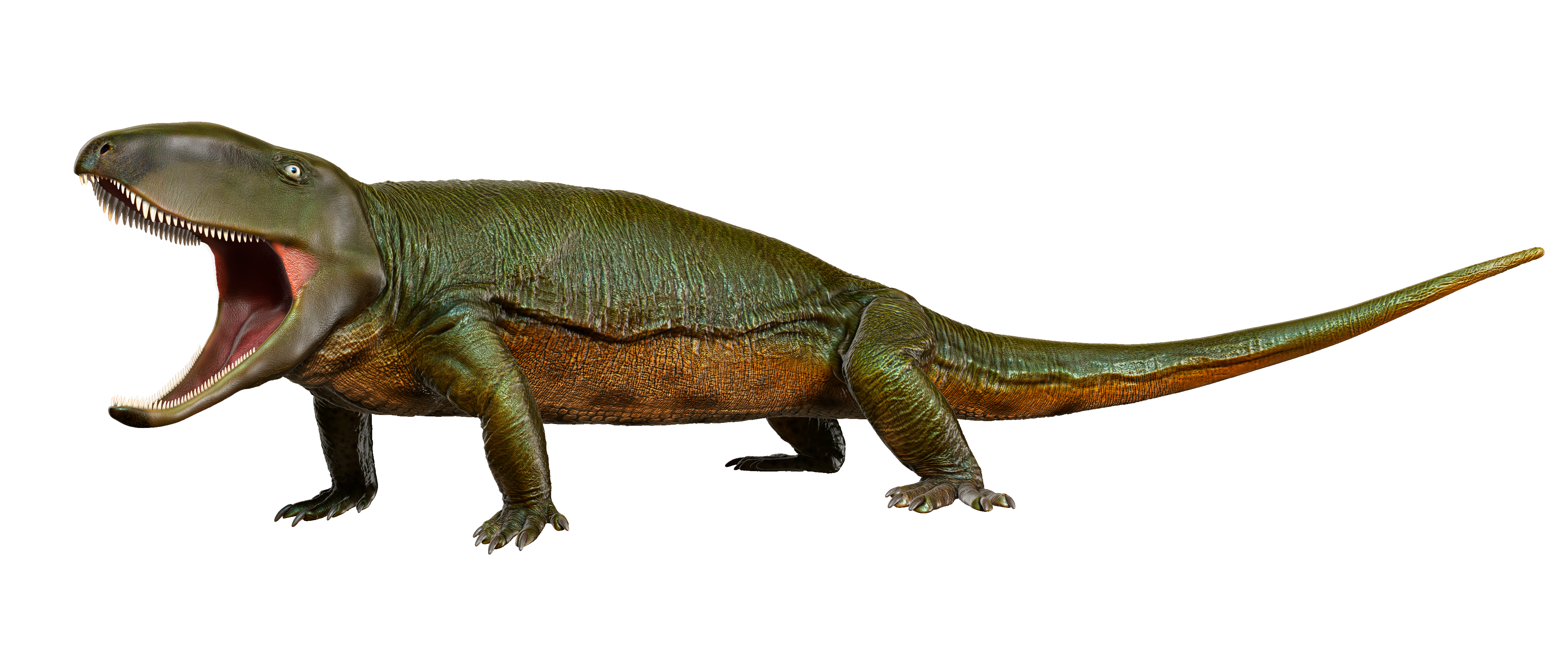
Life restoration of Ophiacodon retroversus

== Description ==
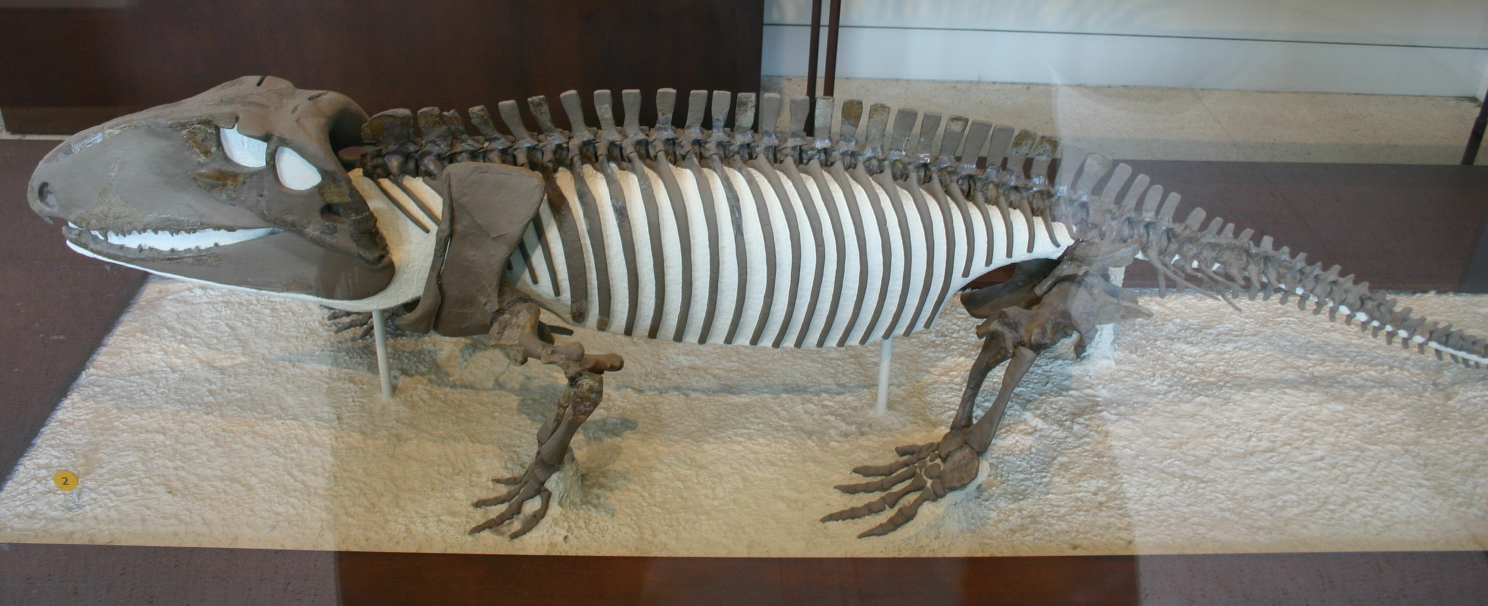
Skeleton of O. retroversus in the American Museum of Natural History, New York

Ophiacodon has a large skull with a deep snout. It has the longest skull of any early synapsid, reaching up to 50 centimetres (20 in) in one specimen. The jaws are lined with many small teeth. It was larger than most other tetrapods (four-limbed vertebrates) of its time, ranging from 1.6 to 3 metres (5.2 to 9.8 ft) in length and 26 to 230 kilograms (57 to 507 lb) in weight.

Specimens of Ophiacodon vary greatly in size. These differences in size were once used to distinguish species, but are now recognized as ontogenetic variations related to the ages of individuals. Smaller bones often have more poorly developed joint surfaces than larger bones, implying that they come from juvenile individuals while the larger bones come from adults. Analysis of the histology or microscopic anatomy of bones suggests that differences in size represent different growth stages rather than different species.

== Range ==
Remains of Ophiacodon have been found in North America and Europe.

- England: Kenilworth - Cisuralian
- France: Lower Permian of Autun
- Canada:
  - (?)Nova Scotia: Joggins Formation - Kasimovian
- United States:
  - Arizona: Cutler Formation - Cisuralian
  - Colorado: Cutler Formation - Cisuralian
  - Kansas: Fort Riley, Chase Group - Cisuralian
  - New Mexico: Cutler Formation - Cisuralian
  - Ohio: Greene Formation, Dunkard Group Cisuralian
  - Oklahoma: Ada Formation - Pennsylvanian, Clyde Formation, Wellington Formation - Cisuralian
  - Texas: Admiral Formation, Belle Plains Formation, Clyde Formation, Wichita Group - Cisuralian
  - Utah: Cutler Formation - Cisuralian

== Paleobiology ==
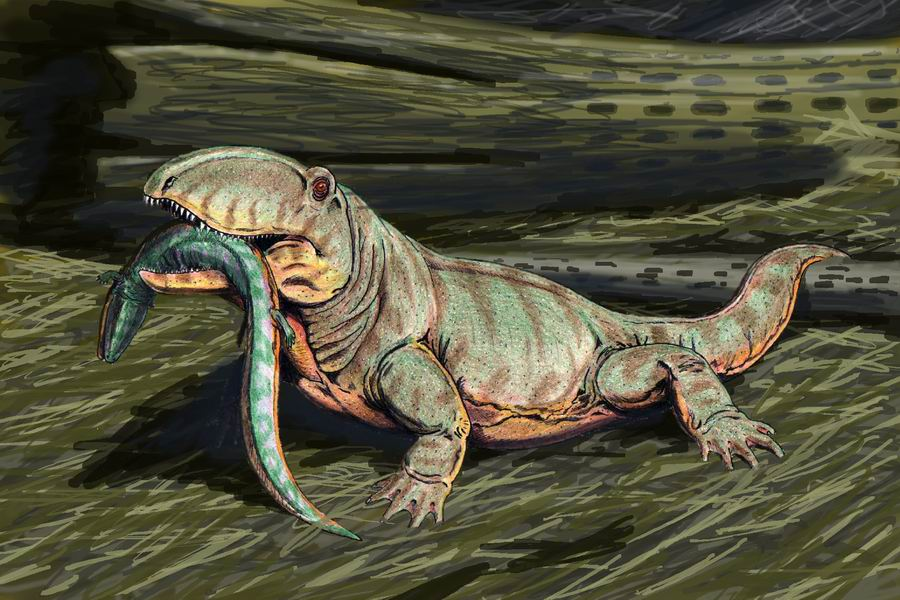
O. mirus restored with a terrestrial lifestyle.

Ophiacodon most likely lived on land, but paleontologists have sometimes thought that it was semi-aquatic. An aquatic habitat for Ophiacodon was first proposed by paleontologist E. C. Case in 1907, although he later dismissed the idea. Anatomical features suggesting that it spent much of its time in the water include broad claws that seemed to be adaptations for paddling, thin jaws and numerous small teeth that seemed to be adapted for eating fish, and weakly developed bones, which are seen in many other secondarily aquatic tetrapods. In 1940, paleontologists Alfred Romer and Llewellyn Ivor Price proposed that hindlimbs with a greater length than forelimbs was another aquatic adaptation of Ophiacodon, supposedly because the hindlimbs would have been used to propel it through water. Several of these features are no longer thought to be evidence of an aquatic lifestyle; for example, broad claws are seen in most early tetrapods, even those that are known to have been almost exclusively terrestrial, and the long hindlimbs of Ophiacodon would not have been an effective means of propulsion because the feet were still relatively small and had little surface area over which to form a paddle. Analysis of the vertebrae of Ophiacodon indicate that it was most likely terrestrial and spent little time in water. A paleobiological inference model for the femur likewise suggests a terrestrial lifestyle for Ophiacodon, even though the rather thick cortex might also suggest amphibious, rather than truly terrestrial habits.

Skeletons of Ophiacodon show a fast growth pattern called fibrolamellar bone (FLB), suggesting at least partial warm-bloodedness. The FLB pattern is also found in birds and mammals.
