= Choza Formation =

Geologic formation in Texas, United States

- Stratigraphic range: Permian
- Type: Formation
- Unit of: Clear Fork Group

Location
- Region: Texas
- Country: United States

The Choza Formation is a geologic formation in Texas. It preserves fossils dating back to the Permian period.
