= Wichita Group =

- Stratigraphic range: Artinskian
- Type: Group
- Sub-units: Nocona Formation, Petrolia Formation, Waggoner Ranch Formation, Lueders Formation
- Underlies: Pease River Group
- Overlies: Bowie Group

Location
- Region: Texas
- Country: United States

The Wichita Group is a geologic group in the Permian Red Beds. It preserves fossils dating back to the Permian period. Formations of this Group include Nocona Formation, Petrolia Formation, Waggoner Ranch Formation and The Belle Plains Formation, witch includes Valera Shale.

== See also ==
- List of fossiliferous stratigraphic units in Texas
- Paleontology in Texas
