= Kladno Formation =

Geologic formation in the Czech Republic

- Stratigraphic range: Westphalian
- Type: Geological formation
- Underlies: Týnec Formation

Location
- Region: Pilsen
- Country: Czech Republic

The Kladno Formation is a Carboniferous formation in the Czech Republic which preserves a wide array of temnospondyls, lepospondyls and fish, among other fauna.

== Paleobiota ==
=== Invertebrates ===
Color key: Taxon / Reclassified taxon / Taxon falsely reported as present / Dubious taxon or junior synonym / Ichnotaxon / Ootaxon / Morphotaxon	Notes; Uncertain or tentative taxa are in small text; ~~crossed out~~ taxa are discredited.

Invertebrates
Genus	Species	Higher taxon	Notes	Images
Necymylacris	N. scudderi	Blattodea	Formerly included within Phylloblatta	
Bohemiatupus	B. elegans	Meganeuridae	One of the larger meganisopterans	
Bojophlebia	B. prokopi	Palaeoptera	Largest insect by wingspan other than palaeodictyopterans or griffinflies.	
Carbotriplura	C. kukalovae	Dicondylia	Sister group to Pterygota, formerly classed as a Bojophlebia nymph.	
Pronaidites	P. carbonarius, P. arenivorus	Tubificidae	"P. crenulatus" actually an ichnofossil	
Microconchus	M. vorax, M. minimus	Tentaculita	Formerly classed as a spirorbid	
Prolimulus	P. woodwardi	Bellinuridae	Likely clades with other genera like Alanops.	
Eolycosa	E. lorenzii	Mesothelae incertae sedis	Spider affinities doubted in a 1996 paper	
Geralycosa	G. fricii	Arthromygalidae	May not be a spider	
Rakovnicia	R. antiqua	Tetrapulmonata incertae sedis		
Pyritaranea	P. tubifera	Araneae incertae sedis	Synonymised with Eopholcus	
Nyranytarbus	N. hofmanni, N. longipes	Trigonotarbida	Formerly placed within Hemiphrynus	
Doubravatarbus	D. krafti	Aphantomartidae	Likely arboreal, due to being found on a liana-like plant and having relatively gracile legs.	
Tynecotarbus	T. tichaveki	Trigonotarbida	Collected alongside two more fragmentary indeterminate fossils	
Palaranea	P. borassifolia	Araneae incertae sedis	Known from a different locality to other Kladno fauna	
Anthracomartus	A. carcinoides, A. bohemica, A. elegans	Trigonotarbida		A. trilobitus fossil (from North America)
Isobuthus	I. nyranensis	Scorpiones		
Prothelyphonus	P. bohemicus	Uropygi	Synonymous with Geralinura	Geralinura fossil (from North America)
Dinopilio	D. gigas	Arachnida incertae sedis	Very large fossil, hence the name	
Geratarbus	G. bohemicus	Phalangiotarbida		
Orthotarbus	O. nyranensis	Phalangiotarbida		
Pleurolycosa	P. prolifera	Arthropoda incertae sedis		
Nyranius	N. costulatus, N. tabulatus	Xyloiuloidea	Formerly within Xylobius	N. costulatus fossil
Pleurojulus	P. biornatus, P. levis	Pleurojulida	Also known from Mazon Creek	P. biornatus fossil
Isojulus	I. constans	Pleurojulida	Synonymised with two Pleurojulus species	
Purkynia	P. lata	Zosterogrammida	Very poorly preserved	Illustration of a P. lata fossil

=== Vertebrates ===
Vertebrates
Genus	Species	Higher taxon	Notes	Images
Archaeothyris	A. sp	Ophiacodontidae	Only known from a jaw fragment	Archaeothyris reconstruction
Brouffia	B. orientalis	Eureptilia	Formerly placed within Gephyrostegus	Brouffia skull reconstruction
Coelostegus	C. prothales	Eureptilia	Recovered as the basalmost eureptile	Coelostegus skull reconstruction
Gephyrostegus	G. bohemicus	Gephyrostegidae	Formerly included another species, G. watsoni	Gephyrostegus reconstruction
Solenodonsaurus	S. janenschi	Reptiliomorpha?	Resembles diadectomorphs, yet likely not closely related to amniotes	Solenodonsaurus reconstruction
Urocordylus	U. angularis	Urocordylinae	Also known from Ireland	Urocordylus reconstruction
Sauropleura	S. scalaris	Sauropleurinae	Formerly included in Urocordylus	Sauropleura life reconstruction
Scincosaurus	S. crassus	Scincosauridae	Formerly synonymised with Keraterpeton, related to diplocaulids	Scincosaurus reconstruction
Keraterpeton	K. galvani	Diplocaulidae	Bore an unusually long tail	Keraterpeton reconstruction
Hyloplesion	H. longicostatum	"Microsauria"	Synonymous with "Orthocosta" and "Seeleya"	Hyloplesion reconstruction
Microbrachis	M. pelikani	Recumbirostra	Synonymised with three other species in the same genus	Microbrachis reconstruction
Ricnodon	R. copei	Recumbirostra?	May be related to Saxonerpeton	
Crinodon	C. limnophyes	Tuditanidae	Name derives from an anagram of Ricnodon	
Sparodus	S. validus	Gymnarthridae?	Resembles Hylerpeton	
Diplovertebron	D. punctatum	Embolomeri	Synonymous with "Nummulosaurus"	Diplovertebron reconstruction
Capetus	C. palustris	Temnospondyli	One of the most basal temnospondyls	Capetus reconstruction
Cochleosaurus	C. bohemicus	Cochleosauridae	Adult specimens only found in 2003	Cochleosaurus life restoration
Mordex	M. calliprepes	Trematopidae	Unclear position within the family	
Mattauschia	M. laticeps	Trematopidae	Formerly included in Mordex, includes "Potamochoston" and several "Limnerpeton" species	
Nyranerpeton	N. amilneri	Micromelerpetontidae	Also known from the Montceau-les-Mines lagerstätte	
Limnogyrinus	L. elegans	Micromelerpetontidae	Formerly included within "Limnerpeton"	
Oestocephalus	O. granulosum, O. nanum	Aistopoda	Formerly included within Ophiderpeton	Oestocephalus reconstruction
Phlegethontia	P. longissima, "Dolichosoma scutiferum"	Aistopoda	Formerly included within the nomen nudum "Dolichosoma"	Phlegethontia reconstruction
Baphetes	B. orientalis	Baphetidae	Formerly known as "Loxomma bohemicum"	
Stambergichthys	S. macrodens	Actinopterygii	Likely a high-level predator in its ecosystem	
Sceletophorus	S. biserialis, S. verrucosus	Trissolepididae		
Pyritocephalus	P. sculptus	Haplolepiformes	Synonymous with other Pyritocephalus species	

=== Plants ===
==== Non-seed plants ====
Non-seed plants
Genus	Species	Higher taxon	Notes	Images
Kladnostrobus	K. clealii, K. psendae	Lycopsida	Within the monotypic family Kladnostrobaceae due to differing sporangia structure	
Lepidophloios	L. acerosus	Lepidodendrales	Mistakenly spelled "Lepidofloios" in the paper reporting its presence	Lepidophloios fossil (from Scotland)
Lepidodendron	L. acutum, L. simile, L. aculeatum, L. ophiurum, L. lycopodioides	Lepidodendrales	One of the most abundant Carboniferous plants	Lepidodendron restoration
Flemingites	F. sp	Lepidodendrales	Cone taxon	
Lepidocarpon	L. majus	Lepidodendrales	Sporangium taxon	
Sigillaria	S. rugosa, S. diploderma	Lepidodendrales	S. diploderma only known from a small fragment	Sigillaria reconstruction
Syringodendron	S. sp	Lepidodendrales	Stem taxon	
Omphalophloios	O. feistmantelli	Isoetales	Questionable specimen known from a fragment of a fertile axis	Omphalophloios fossil
Stigmaria	S. ficoides	Lepidodendrales	Form taxon representing roots	Stigmaria fossil
Calamites	C. carinatus, C. distachya?, C. cistii?	Calamitaceae	Second species is closest to C. distachya, but poor preservation means its affinity is unclear	Reconstruction of the entire Calamites tree
Annularia	A. radiata	Calamitaceae	Leaf taxon of Calamites stems	A. stellata fossil
Asterophylites	A. longifolius, A. equisetiformis, A. grandis	Calamitaceae	One specimen preserves the tip of a branch with dense leaves	
Sphenophyllum	S. cuneifolium, S. pseudoaquense, S. ?majus, S. priveticense	Sphenophyllales	Very common, but often poorly preserved	Sphenophyllum reconstruction
Bowmanites	B. priveticensis, B. myriophyllus, B. pseudoaquensis, B. brasensis	Sphenophyllales	Cones of Sphenophyllum	
Lobatopteris	L. aspidioides	Marattiales	Only one small fragment preserved	L. corsinii fossil (from Spain)
Corynepteris	C. sternbergii, C. angustissima, C. essinghii	Zygopteridales	C. sternbergii may be synonymous with C. angustissima	C. angustissima fossil
Senftenbergia	S. plumosa	Tedeleaceae (Filicales)	Common elsewhere, yet rare in Kladno	S. dentata fossil (from Spain)
Zeilleria	Z. delicatula	Filicales incertae sedis	Shares its name with a Jurassic brachiopod	
Renaultia	R. crepinii	Filicales incertae sedis	Only known from a fragment	R. lebachensis fossil (from Spain)
Sphenopteris	S. rotundifolia, S. mixta, S. delicatula, S. acutiloba, S. ujezdensis, S. pulcherrima, S. cirrhifolia, S. spinosa	Filicales incertae sedis (rotundifolia), Lyginopteridales (others)	Includes seed plants and a fern	S. rotundiloba fossil
Aphlebia	A. sp	Indeterminate	Artificial taxon; may belong to another species preserved.	A. crispa fossil (accompanied by Polymorphopteris)
Noeggerathia	N. foliosa, N. intermedia	Noeggerathiales	Most common plant in the sampled fossils	Drawings of N. expansa fossils
Archaeonoeggerathia	A. schatzlarensis	Noeggerathiales		
Discosoropteris	D. zlatkokvacekii, D. chlupatum	Filicales incertae sedis	Likely a short, upright plant	
Spencerites	S. leismanii, S. havlenae	Lycopsida incertae sedis	A member of the "sub-arborescent" lycophytes	
Dendraena	D. pinnatilobata	Anachoropteridaceae (Filicales)	Likely grew near river margins, a very common plant	
Kidstonia	K. heracleensis	Filicales	Likely a small understorey fern	
Desmopteris	D. alethopteroides, D. longifolia	Filicales	Likely bore procumbent (growing along the ground) rhizomes	
Selaginella	S. gutbieri, S. labutae	Selaginellaceae	Extant genus	The extant S. selaginoides (from Estonia)
Palaeostachya	P. distachya, P. gracilima	Calamitaceae	Cone taxon, although with a complete plant known from the early Permian of China	P. sp fossil (from Mazon Creek)
Pecopteris	P. aspidioides, P. tuffitica	Psaroniaceae	Likely a mid-sized tree fern	P. sp fossil (from Mazon Creek)
Sonapteris	S. pilsensis, S. barthelii, S. bekii	Botryopteridaceae (Filicales)	Possibly a liana-like plant?	
Oligocarpia	O. lindsaeoides	Gleicheniales?	Probably a liana-like plant	O. gutbieri fossil (from Germany)
Adiantites	A. sp	Progymnospermopsida	Likely a low-lying plant	
Echinosporangites	E. libertite	Filicopsida?	Sporangium taxon, parent plant unknown	
Polysporia	P. drabekii, P. rothwelii, P. radvanicensis, P. robusta	Isoetales	A sub-arborescent lycophyte	
Huttonia	H. spicata	Equisetales	Cone taxon	
Thomasites	T. serrata, T. elongatus	Lycopsida	T. elongatus formerly placed in Selaginellites	

==== Seed plants ====
Seed plants
Genus	Species	Higher taxon	Notes	Images
Alethopteris	A. lonchitica, A. distantinervosa, A. pseudograndinioides, A. kettneri, A. serlii	Medullosales	A. pseudograndinioides is a replacement name for the illegitimate "A. grandinioides"	A. lonchitica fossil
Neuromariopteris	N. scandens	Callistophytales	Likely a creeping plant growing on ridge slopes	
Eusphenopteris	E. nummularia	Lyginopteridales	While a large (>1 m) frond was found, it could not be transported from the site.	E. striata fossil
Lonchopteris	L. rugosa	Medullosales	Possible record of L. chandesrisii (although based on a poorly preserved specimen) also known	L. rugosa fossil
Macroneuropteris	M. scheuchzeri	Medullosales	Formerly placed within Neuropteris	M. scheuchzeri frond reconstruction
Neuropteris	N. plicata	Medullosales	Placement of this species is unclear in relation to N. ovata.	N. ovata fossil (from Kansas)
Odontopteris	O. reichiana	Medullosales	May be synonymous with O. brardii	O. genuina fossil
Callipteridium	C. rubescens, C. armasii	Medullosales	May be synonymous with C. jongmansii	C. gigas fossil
Laveineopteris	L. loshii, L. tenuifolia, L. bohemica, L. lubnensis, L. hollandica	Medullosales	L. loshii is abundant elsewhere, while some other species are endemic to the Kladno Formation	L. rarinervis fossil
Palaeoweichselia	P. defrancei	Medullosales	Described from Kladno in a 2020 overview paper despite specimens being already known prior	
Linopteris	L. neuropteroides, L. obliqua, L. weigelii	Medullosales	L. neuropteroides is split into two forms, neuropteroides and minor.	L. subbrongniarti fossil
Paripteris	P. linguaefolia	Medullosales	Included alleged records of P. gigantea	
Havlenaea	H. coriacea, H. stradonitzensis	Medullosales	Formerly placed within Neuropteris	
Mixoneura	M. muensterifolia	Medullosales	Too poorly preserved to place within a new genus, yet does not belong to Mixoneura either	
Rhacopteris	R. elegans	Pteridospermatophyta	Only known from one isolated pinnule (leaf cluster)	R. elegans fossil (from Italy)
Cordaites	C. theodorii, C. wartmannii, C. kladnoensis, C. borassifolius	Cordaitales	C. theodorii is only known from this formation	C. foliatus fossil (from France)
Palmatopteris	P. furcata	Lyginopteridales	Probably a liana-like plant	P. furcata fossil (from Germany)
Mariopteris	M. muricata	Lyginopteridales	Likely a vining plant, as its fossils are all associated with Lepidodendron.	M. muricata fossil (from Spain)
Fortopteris	F. radnicensis	Medullosales	Not given a type specimen in its original description within Mariopteris.	
Rhodeites	R. gutbieri	Lyginopteridales	Likely a canopy-dwelling climber	
