= 2019 in amphibian paleontology =

== New taxa ==
Name	Novelty	Status	Authors	Age	Type locality	Country	Notes	Images
Anthracobamus	Gen. et comb. nov	Valid	Werneburg	Late Carboniferous		Czech Republic; France	An amphibamiform temnospondyl, possibly a member of the family Micropholidae. The type species is "Platyrhinops" fritschi Werneburg (2012); genus also includes "Protriton" fayoli Thevenin (1906).	
Branchierpeton saberi	Sp. nov	Valid	Werneburg et al.	Carboniferous (Kasimovian)	Souss Basin	Morocco	A micromelerpetid temnospondyl.	
Branchiosaurus commentryensis	Sp. nov	Valid	Werneburg	Carboniferous (Gzhelian)		France		
Cratopipa	Gen. et sp. nov	Valid	Carvalho et al.	Early Cretaceous (Aptian)	Crato Formation	Brazil	A frog belonging to the group Pipimorpha. Genus includes new species C. novaolindensis.	
Diabloroter	Gen. et sp. nov	Valid	Mann & Maddin	Carboniferous (Pennsylvanian)	Mazon Creek fossil beds	United States	A short-bodied recumbirostran. Genus includes new species D. bolti.	
Hassiacoscutum	Gen. et sp. nov	Valid	Witzmann et al.	Late Permian		Germany	A chroniosuchian belonging to the family Bystrowianidae. Genus includes new species H. munki.	
Infernovenator	Gen. et sp. nov	Valid	Mann, Pardo & Maddin	Carboniferous (Pennsylvanian)	Mazon Creek fossil beds	United States	A member of Lysorophia. Genus includes new species I. steenae.	
Linglongtriton	Gen. et sp. nov	Valid	Jia & Gao	Late Jurassic (Oxfordian)	Tiaojishan Formation	China	A stem-hynobiid salamander. Genus includes new species L. daxishanensis.	
Mattauschia	Gen. et comb. nov	Valid	Milner	Late Carboniferous (Moscovian)	Kladno Formation	Czech Republic	A trematopid temnospondyl. Genus includes "Limnerpeton" laticeps Fritsch (1881).	
Montceaubatrachus	Gen. et sp. nov	Valid	Werneburg	Carboniferous/Permian (Gzhelian/Asselian)		France	An amphibamiform temnospondyl. The type species is M. platyrynchus.	
Nevobatrachus	Nom. nov	Valid	Mahony	Early Cretaceous		Israel	A frog belonging to the group Pipimorpha; a replacement name for Cordicephalus Nevo (1968).	
Nyranerpeton montceauense	Sp. nov	Valid	Werneburg	Carboniferous/Permian (Gzhelian/Asselian)		France	A micromelerpetid temnospondyl.	
Panthasaurus	Gen. et comb. nov	Valid	Chakravorti & Sengupta	Late Triassic (late Carnian to early Norian)	Maleri Formation; Tiki Formation	India	A metoposaurid temnospondyl. Genus includes "Metoposaurus" maleriensis Roy Chowdhury (1965).	
Parmastega	Gen. et sp. nov	Valid	Beznosov et al.	Devonian (Famennian)	Sosnogorsk Formation	Russia (Komi Republic)	A basal tetrapod. Genus includes new species P. aelidae.	
Patagopipa	Gen. et sp. nov	Valid	Rolando, Agnolin & Corsolini	Eocene	Huitrera Formation	Argentina	A frog belonging to the group Pipimorpha. Genus includes new species P. corsolini.	
Rhinella loba	Sp. nov	Valid	Pérez-Ben, Gómez & Báez	Chapadmalalan	Chapadmalal Formation	Argentina	A true toad, a species of Rhinella.	
Trypanognathus	Gen. et sp. nov	Valid	Schoch & Voigt	Carboniferous-Permian boundary		Germany	A dvinosaurian temnospondyl. Genus includes new species T. remigiusbergensis.	

== Research ==
- A study on changes of the skeletal anatomy of the pelvic and pectoral appendages during the transition from fins to limbs in vertebrate evolution, as indicated by data from fossil lobe-finned fishes and early tetrapods, is published by Esteve-Altava et al. (2019).
- An outline of a new interpretative scenario for the origin of tetrapods, based on data from tetrapod body fossils and from putative tetrapod trace fossils from Poland and Ireland that predate earliest tetrapod body fossils, is presented by Ahlberg (2019).
- A historical review of the fossil record of Devonian tetrapods and basal tetrapodomorphs from East Gondwana (Australasia, Antarctica) is published by Long, Clement & Choo (2019).
- A study on the macroevolutionary dynamics of shape changes in the humeri of all major grades and clades of early tetrapods and their fish-like forerunners is published by Ruta et al. (2019).
- A study on the phylogenetic relationships of early tetrapods is published by Marjanović & Laurin (2019).
- A study on the anatomy of the palate and neurocranium of Whatcheeria deltae is published by Bolt & Lombard (2019).
- A study on the morphology of the postcranial skeleton of Crassigyrinus scoticus is published by Herbst & Hutchinson (2019).
- Herbst et al. (2019) report new evidence of bone healing in the hindlimbs of Crassigyrinus scoticus and Eoherpeton watsoni, and evaluate the implications of these findings for the knowledge of the evolution of bone healing mechanisms in early tetrapods.
- Description of a new specimen of Oestocephalus from Five Points, Ohio, preserving much of the posterior braincase, is published by Pardo, Holmes & Anderson (2019), who also evaluate the implications of this specimen for inferring the phylogenetic placement of aïstopods.
- A study on the holotype specimen of Acherontiscus caledoniae is published by Clack et al. (2019), who consider this taxon to be the earliest known heterodont and durophagous tetrapod.
- A limb bone and a possible ilium on an early tetrapod are described from the Carboniferous (Bashkirian) Clare Shale Formation (Ireland) by Doyle & Ó Gogáin (2019), representing the oldest stratigraphically weill-constrained tetrapod skeletal fossil material from Ireland reported so far.
- Description of fossils of embolomeres collected in 1915 by Walter A. Bell from the Mississippian-aged Point Edward Formation (Nova Scotia, Canada) is published online by Adams, Mann & Maddin (2019).
- A study on patterns of shape and size changes of the orbits and vacuities in the skulls of temnospondyls and other early tetrapods is published by Witzmann & Ruta (2019).
- A study evaluating whether the intraspecific integration of morphological traits significantly affected the evolution of the skull roof of temnospondyls over geological time is published by Pérez-Ben & Gómez (2019).
- A study on patterns of ontogenetic allometry in the skull roof of temponspondyls, and on their relationship with adult morphological evolution, is published online by Pérez-Ben, Báez & Schoch (2019).
- Tracks produced by an edopoid temnospondyl are described from the Carboniferous (Viséan) Alston Formation (North Yorkshire, United Kingdom) by Bird et al. (2019), representing the stratigraphically oldest known tetrapod trackway from the United Kingdom reported so far and the oldest known record of Edopoidea.
- A study on the structure of stapes of Edops craigi is published by Schoch (2019).
- A fragment of a skull roof of a possible basal dvinosaur is described from the Carboniferous (Viséan) Ortelsdorf Formation (Germany) by Werneburg, Witzmann & Schneider (2019), representing the oldest known tetrapod record in Germany and, together with Balanerpeton, the oldest temnospondyl reported so far.
- A study on the evolution of the braincase anatomy of dissorophoid temnospondyls, and on its implications for the knowledge of the evolution of the lissamphibian braincase, is published by Atkins, Reisz & Maddin (2019).
- Description of new fossil material of dissorophoid temnospondyls from the early Permian locality of Richards Spur (Oklahoma, United States) is published by Gee, Bevitt & Reisz (2019).
- Complete skull and mandibles of a small-bodied trematopid of uncertain phylogenetic placement, most closely resembling members of the genus Acheloma, is described from the Early Permian karst deposits near Richards Spur (Oklahoma, United States) by Gee, Bevitt & Reisz (2019), who also evaluate the implications of this specimen for the knowledge of trematopid ontogeny and taxonomy.
- A study on the anatomy and phylogenetic relationships of Nanobamus macrorhinus is published online by Gee & Reisz (2019).
- A study on the phylogenetic relationships of stereospondylomorph temnospondyls is published by Eltink, Schoch & Langer (2019), who name a new clade Superstes.
- Rediscovery of the original type specimen of Sclerocephalus haeuseri is reported by Schoch, Ebert & Robert (2019).
- A humerus of a member or a relative of the genus Cyclotosaurus is described from Rhaetian sediments of Exter Formation (Germany) by Konietzko-Meier et al. (2019), representing the geologically youngest record of a non-brachyopoid temnospondyl reported so far.
- A study on the palaeobiology and lifestyle adaptations of Cherninia denwai and Paracyclotosaurus crookshanki, as indicated by limb bone anatomy and histology, is published online by Mukherjee, Sengupta & Rakshit (2019).
- Redescription of the Angusaurus, based on a new specimen providing new information of the skull anatomy of this taxon, is published by Fernández-Coll et al. (2019).
- A study on the anatomy and phylogenetic relationships of Trematosaurus brauni is published by Schoch (2019).
- A study on the morphology of the mandibular sutures in Metoposaurus krasiejowensis, using histological thin sections, is published by Gruntmejer et al. (2019).
- Redescription of holotypes of metoposaurid species Anaschisma browni and A. brachygnatha is published online by Gee, Parker & Marsh (2019), who consider Anaschisma brachygnatha and Koskinonodon perfectus to be junior synonyms of Anaschisma browni.
- A study on the biomechanical role of sutures in the skull of Metoposaurus krasiejowensis is published by Gruntmejer et al. (2019).
- A study on the anatomy and phylogenetic relationships of "Metoposaurus" azerouali is published by Buffa, Jalil & Steyer (2019), who transfer this species to the genus Arganasaurus.
- A revision of Triassic temnospondyl fossil material from the Folakara area of Madagascar (Isalo Group, Morondava Basin), including fossils attributed to the species "Metoposaurus" hoffmani, is published by Fortuny et al. (2019).
- A study on the age of the fossils of Siderops kehli is published by Todd et al. (2019).
- A study on long bone histology of specimens of the cryptobranchid species Eoscapherpeton asiaticum of different age is published by Skutschas et al. (2019).
- Fossils of members of Salientia, possibly more closely related to crown-group Anura than to Early Triassic taxa Triadobatrachus and Czatkobatrachus, are described from the Upper Triassic Chinle Formation (Arizona, United States) by Stocker et al. (2019), representing both the first Late Triassic and the earliest equatorial record of Salientia.
- A study on the two-dimensional morphology of extant and fossil anuran skulls, evaluating whether phylogeny, development or ecology is a greater influence on anuran skull morphology, and quantifying how anuran skull morphology changed through time, is published by Bardua, Evans & Goswami (2019).
- A study on the ecomorphological diversity of the Early Cretaceous (Barremian) frogs from the Iberian Peninsula is published by Gómez & Lires (2019).
- Redescription of the Cretaceous frog Wealdenbatrachus jucarensis is published by Báez & Gómez (2019).
- A specimen of a frog Genibatrachus baoshanensis with a complete adult salamander belonging or related to the genus Nuominerpeton in its gut is described from the Lower Cretaceous Guanghua Formation (China) by Xing, Niu & Evans (2019).
- Fossils of the painted frog Latonia gigantea are described from the Miocene of the Vallès-Penedès Basin (Spain) by Villa et al. (2019), representing the first known record of the species from the Iberian Peninsula.
- Fossils of Latonia cf. gigantea are described from the early Miocene of Greece (representing the first record of the species from that country) by Georgalis et al. (2019), along with other amphibian and reptile fossils.
- A study on the anatomy of the skull of Latonia seyfriedi is published by Syromyatnikova, Roček & van de Velde (2019), who consider Latonia gigantea to be a likely junior synonym of L. seyfriedi.
- A study on the morphological diversification of pipimorph frogs and on the impact of ecological and developmental constraints on the evolution of the sacro-caudo-pelvic complex of pipid frogs, as indicated by data from extant and extinct taxa, is published by Gómez & Pérez-Ben (2019).
- A neurocranium of a clawed frog is described from the Oligocene Nsungwe Formation (Tanzania) by Blackburn et al. (2019), providing the earliest evidence for the genus Xenopus in sub-Saharan Africa reported so far.
- A study on the developmental stage, physical condition, health, behavior, death, and burial of an exceptionally well-preserved tadpole of a European spadefoot toad from the Miocene (Turolian) konservat-lagerstätte deposit near Tresjuncos (Province of Cuenca, Spain) is published by Talavera, Bustillo & Sanchiz (2019).
- A redescription of Pelobates praefuscus from the Pliocene of Moldova is published by Syromyatnikova (2019), who considers this taxon to be a species distinct from Pelobates fuscus.
- A revision of the fossil material attributed to members of the genus Ceratophrys is published by Nicoli (2019).
- Four new, three-dimensionally preserved specimens of Discosauriscus pulcherrimus, providing new information on the anatomy of the skull of this species, are described from the Lower Permian lacustrine sediments of the Boskovice Basin (Czech Republic) by Klembara & Mikudíková (2019).
- A study on the morphology of the skeleton of Keraterpeton is published by Milner (2019).
- New fossil material of Llistrofus pricei, providing new information on the anatomy of this taxon, is described from Permian (Sakmarian) cave deposits of Richards Spur, Oklahoma by Gee et al. (2019), who interpret their findings as indicating that Hapsidopareion lepton is not synonymous with L. pricei.
- A study on the anatomy of the postcranial skeleton of Carrolla craddocki is published by Mann, Olori & Maddin (2019).
- A study aiming to determine plausible gaits of Orobates pabsti is published by Nyakatura et al. (2019).
- A study on the anatomy of the inner ear of seymouriamorphs and diadectomorphs, and on its implications for the knowledge of the phylogenetic relationships of these groups, is published online by Klembara et al. (2019).
- A study on the relationship between geographic range, climate and extinction risk throughout the evolutionary history of amphibians is published online by Tietje, Rödel & Schobben (2019).
