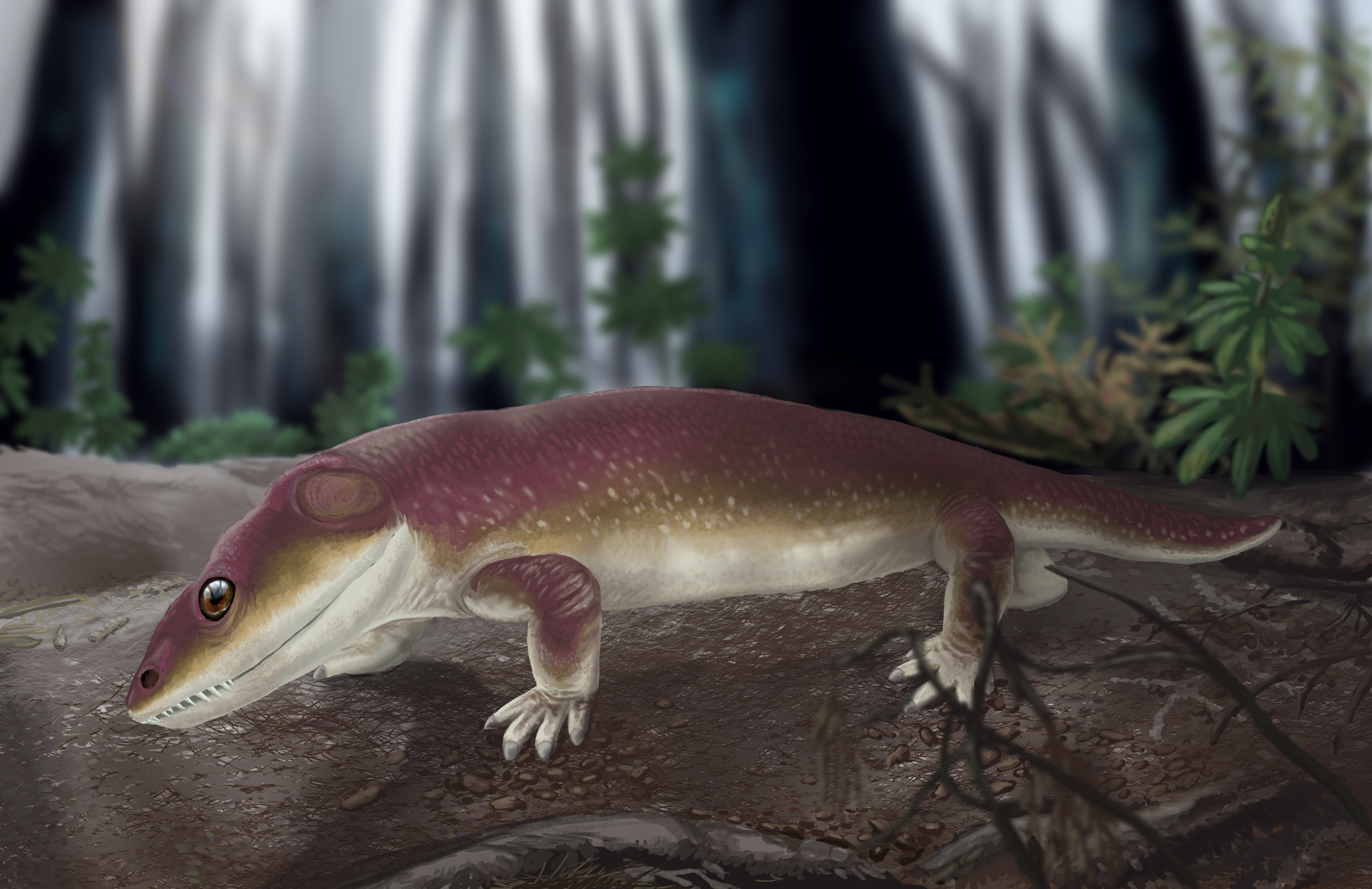
- Restoration of Rotaryus gothae

Scientific classification
- Domain: Eukaryota
- Kingdom: Animalia
- Phylum: Chordata
- Order: †Temnospondyli
- Family: †Trematopidae
- Genus: †Rotaryus; Berman et al., 2011

Type species
- †Rotaryus gothae Berman et al., 2011

= Rotaryus =

Rotaryus Temporal range: Early Permian, 284–279.5 Ma

Extinct genus of amphibians

Rotaryus is an extinct genus of Early Permian trematopid dissorophoid temnospondyl known from the Free State of Thuringia of central Germany.

== Discovery ==
Rotaryus is known only from the holotype MNG 10182, articulated partial well-preserved skull and both mandibles and a closely associated partial postcranial skeleton. The postcranial skeleton includes several articulated neural arches with ribs, most of the left shoulder girdle, humeri, right radius and ulna, and a femur. It was collected from the uppermost part of the Tambach Formation, dating to the Artinskian stage of the Late Cisuralian Series (or alternatively upper Rotliegend), about 284-279.5 million years ago. It was found in the lowermost formational unit of the Upper Rotliegend Group or Series of the Bromacker Quarry, the middle part of the Thuringian Forest, near the village of Tambach-Dietharz. Rotaryus is only the second trematopid species to be reported from the Bromacker locality, and outside of United States, alongside Tambachia.

== Phylogeny ==
Rotaryus is characterized by a unique combination of characters, including the two following autapomorphies: "entire length of nasolacrimal canal exposed as a smooth, uniform channel in which the anterior half coincides with the maxillary-lacrimal suture; and parasphenoid plate has an outline of an isosceles triangle, with the shorter, equal-length lateral margins converging on the cultriform process." The following cladogram shows the phylogenetic position of Rotaryus, from Berman et al., 2011.

- Dissorophoidea
  - Amphibamidae
    - - Eoscopus
      - - Amphibamus
        - Doleserpeton
    - - Micropholis
      - Tersomius
  - - Ecolsonia
    - Dissorophidae
      - Broiliellus
      - Dissorophus
      - - Aspidosaurus
        - Cacops
    - Trematopidae
      - - Fedexia
        - - Anconastes
          - Tambachia
      - - Rotaryus
        - - Acheloma
          - Phonerpeton

== Etymology ==
Rotaryus was first named by David S. Berman, Amy C. Henrici, Thomas Martens, Stuart S. Sumida and Jason S. Anderson in 2011 and the type species is Rotaryus gothae. Both the generic name and the specific name honor the Rotary Club of Gotha, Germany, for supporting financially the excavations and the Bromacker locality project.
