= Limnerpeton =

Limnerpeton Temporal range: Late Carboniferous, 311.45–306.95 Ma

Scientific classification
- Kingdom: Animalia
- Phylum: Chordata
- Clade: Tetrapoda
- Order: †Temnospondyli
- Family: †Amphibamidae
- Genus: †Limnerpeton; Fritsch, 1881

Type species
- †Limnerpeton modestum Fritsch, 1881

Extinct genus of amphibians

Limnerpeton is an extinct genus of dissorophoidean euskelian temnospondyl within the family Amphibamidae.

== Taxonomy ==
Limnerpeton is currently restricted to the type species L. modestum, which is dubious but represents an amphibamid. The nominal species "Limnerpeton" laticeps was later assigned to the trematopid Mordex but has been placed in a separate trematopid genus Mattauschia following Milner (2018). The nominal species L." macrolepis was synonymized with laticeps by Milner and Sequeira (2003) and Milner (2018). "Limnerpeton" elegans was reassigned to Micromelerpetontidae and renamed Limnogyrinus by Milner (1986). "Limnerpeton" caducus is a junior synonym of Oestocephalus, while "Limnerpeton" obtusatum was synonymized with Microbrachis by Carroll and Gaskill (1978).

== See also ==
- Prehistoric amphibian
- List of prehistoric amphibians
