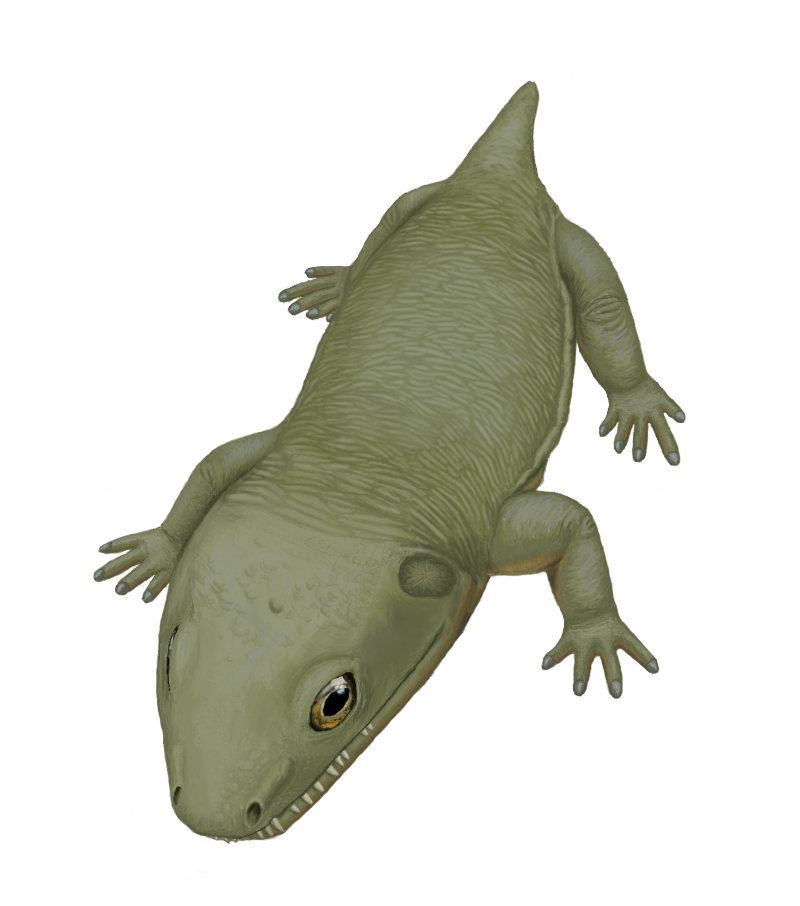

Scientific classification
- Kingdom: Animalia
- Phylum: Chordata
- Clade: Tetrapoda
- Order: †Temnospondyli
- Family: †Trematopidae
- Genus: †Anconastes; Berman et al., 1987

Species
- †A. vesperus Berman et al., 1987 (type)

= Anconastes =

Anconastes Temporal range: Late Carboniferous

Extinct genus of amphibians

Anconastes is an extinct genus of dissorophoid temnospondyl within the family Trematopidae. It is known from two specimens from the Late Carboniferous Cutler Formation of north-central New Mexico in the southwestern United States. The genus name derives from two Greek roots, ankos ("mountain glen or valley") and nastes ("inhabitant"), which refers to the type locality of El Cobre Canyon where the specimens were found. The specific name is derived from the Latin word vesperus ("western"). The more complete specimen, the holotype, is a partial skull with articulated mandibles and a substantial amount of the postcranial skeleton. The less complete specimen, the paratype, consists only of the right margin of the skull with an articulated mandible.

== Anatomy ==
When originally described, only three other trematopid taxa were recognized: Acheloma, Actiobates, and "Trematops" (now a synonym of Acheloma); Ecolsonia, which is now considered a trematopid by most workers, had recently been re-described as a dissorophid on the basis of new material. Berman et al. suggested two autapomorphies: (1) an internal naris that is half as wide as it is long; and (2) a dense covering of non-overlapping scales or osteoderms in the dorsal trunk region. They further differentiated Anconastes from Acheloma and "Trematops" by several features: (1) large orbit with a width equal to 1/3 the midline length of the skull; (2) a short suborbital bar with a maxilla entering the orbital margin; (3) pointed snout without prominent dorsomedial expansion of the postparietals; (4) nasals, frontals, and parietals of subequal length; (5) parietals approximately three times the length of the postparietals; (6) frontals not extending beyond the anterior margin of the orbit; (7) large interpterygoid vacuities; (8) an open basicranial joint; and (9) absence of an internarial opening or bone. They differentiated Anconastes from Actiobates by the presence of a quadratojugal contributing substantially to the ventral margin of the otic notch.

More recent review work has refined the diagnostic features to a handful of the original features proposed by Berman et al. with the study of additional trematopid material and the description of new taxa.

== Relationships ==
Anconastes is an uncontroversial trematopid and is most often recovered as the sister taxon to Tambachia from the early Permian Bromacker Quarry in Germany. Below is the topology from Polley & Reisz (2011):

- - Sclerocephalus haeuseri
  - Micromelerpeton credneri
  - - Micropholis stowi
    - - Eoscopus lockardi
      - Olsoniformes
        - Cacops morrisi
        - Trematopidae
          - Phonerpeton pricei
          - - Acheloma
              - Acheloma cumminsi
              - Acheloma dunni
            - - Actiobates peabodyi
              - - Ecolsonia cutlerensis
                - - Anconastes vesperus
                  - Tambachia trogallas
