= Casiogrammus =

Casiogrammus Temporal range: Wenlock

Scientific classification
- Kingdom: Animalia
- Phylum: Arthropoda
- Subphylum: Myriapoda
- Class: Diplopoda
- Order: †Zosterogrammida
- Family: †Zosterogrammidae
- Genus: †Casiogrammus; Wilson, 2005
- Species: †C. ichthyeros

Binomial name
- †Casiogrammus ichthyeros Wilson, 2005

Extinct genus of millipedes

Casiogrammus is an extinct genus of millipede in the family Zosterogrammidae. There is one described species in Casiogrammus, C. ichthyeros.
