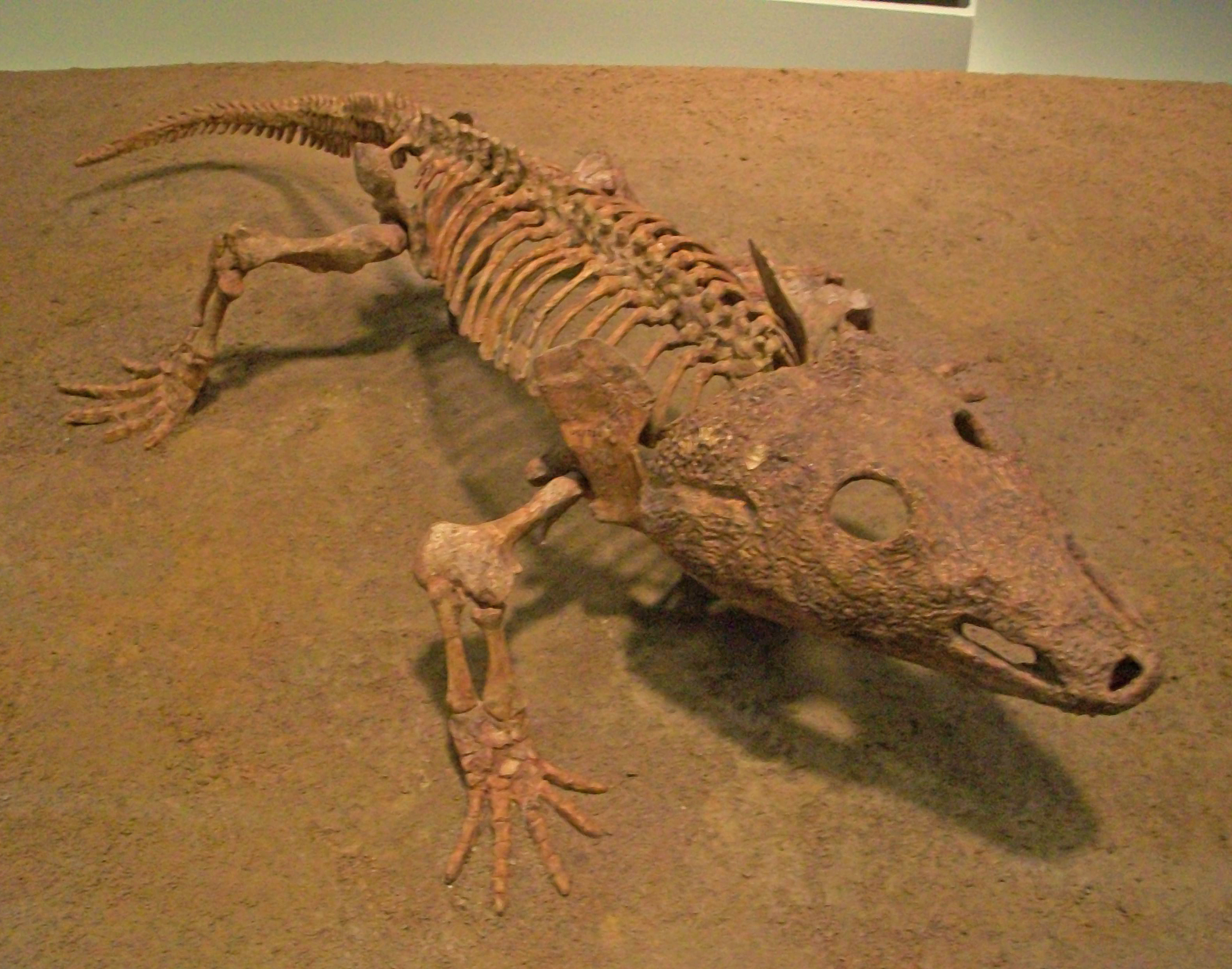
- Skeleton of Acheloma cumminsi in the Field Museum of Natural History.

Scientific classification
- Kingdom: Animalia
- Phylum: Chordata
- Clade: Tetrapoda
- Order: †Temnospondyli
- Clade: †Olsoniformes
- Family: †Trematopidae; Williston, 1910

Genera
- Acheloma; Actiobates; Anconastes; Ecolsonia; Fedexia; Phonerpeton; Rotaryus; Tambachia; Mordex; Mattauschia

= Trematopidae =

Trematopidae Temporal range: 305.9–272.5 Ma

Extinct family of temnospondyls

Trematopidae is a family of dissorophoid temnospondyls spanning the late Carboniferous to the early Permian. Together with Dissorophidae, the family forms Olsoniformes, a clade comprising the medium-large terrestrial dissorophoids. Trematopids are known from numerous localities in North America, primarily in New Mexico, Oklahoma, and Texas, and from the Bromacker quarry in Germany.

== History of study ==
The clade Trematopidae was first proposed by American paleontologist S.W. Williston in 1910, although it was named as "Trematopsidae" following the historical (but inaccurate) derivation from the genus "Trematops" (now synonymized with Acheloma). British paleontologist D.M.S. Watson proposed a related clade in 1919, Achelomidae, for Acheloma, based on perceived differences separating the taxa; this is now considered a junior synonym of Trematopidae following guidelines of historical precedent.

=== 19th-century history ===
In 1882, American paleontologist Edward Drinker Cope named Acheloma cumminsi based on material collected from the early Permian of Texas. This is technically the first trematopid to be named, although the holotype of Mordex calliprepes was named a year earlier as a species of Limnerpeton by Czech paleontologist Antonin Fritsch in 1881 (one year prior); the status of Mordex as a trematopid remained debated however until the revision by Milner (2018).

=== 20th-century history ===
In the first half of the 20th century, American paleontologist S.W. Williston named a new genus from the early Permian of Texas, Trematops. At the time, most workers regarded it as only distantly related to Cope's Acheloma. Two additional species of Trematops were named in short order, Trematops thomasi from Oklahoma, named by American paleontologist Maurice Mehl, and Trematops willistoni from Texas, named by American paleontologist E.C. Olson in 1941. Both are now regarded as junior synonyms of Acheloma cumminsi. Olson also named two species of Acheloma, A. whitei and A. pricei; both are now regarded as belonging to Phonerpeton. In the same paper that he named these taxa, Olson also provided the first review of the Trematopidae, synthesizing all of the known material and providing updated taxonomic frameworks.

The second half of the 20th century saw an increase in trematopid research. In 1956, Olson named a new genus and species of trematopid from the Vale Formation of Texas, Trematopsis seltini; this is now regarded as a junior synonym of the dissorophid Cacops aspidephorus. In 1969, American paleontologist Peter Vaughn described the first trematopid from New Mexico, Ecolsonia cutlerensis, named for the contemporaneous Olson and the Cutler Formation from which the holotype was collected. A re-description of this taxon based on substantial new material, was completed in 1985 by a team led by American paleontologist David Berman from the Carnegie Museum of Natural History. In 1970, Olson named a new species of Trematops from the early Permian of Ohio, "Trematops stonei"; this is the only occurrence of Acheloma/Trematops outside of Texas and Oklahoma but is now accepted to be a junior synonym of Acheloma cumminsi. In 1973, American paleontologist Theodore Eaton named Actiobates peabodyi, the first and only trematopid from Kansas and the oldest trematopid in North America. Eaton also challenged the longstanding separation of trematopids and dissorophids, synonymizing them under Dissorophidae, but this has not been supported or maintained by subsequent workers. Additional material from the Garnett quarry where Actiobates was discovered, assigned to "Hesperoherpeton garnettense" may also belong to Actiobates. In 1974, American paleontologist John Bolt published two papers, one describing the first trematopid material from the fossil-rich site near Richards Spur, Oklahoma, and the a second exploring the function of the elongate naris in trematopids. In 1985, Olson described a purported larval specimen of a trematopid; this was subsequently challenged by Canadian paleontologist David Dilkes in 1991, and the specimen is now regarded to be an adult specimen of an amphibamiform dissorophoid. In 1987, the second trematopid from New Mexico, Anconastes vesperus, named for its discovery in El Cobre Canyon in western North America, was described by the same team of Berman, Reisz, and Eberth who described Ecolsonia. Also in 1987, Dilkes and Robert R. Reisz of the University of Toronto re-described the holotypes of Acheloma cumminsi and Trematops milleri and identified them as synonyms; A. cumminsi takes precedence, having been described first. In 1990, Dilkes named a new taxon of trematopid from the early Permian of Texas, Phonerpeton pricei. A study on developmental changes to the characteristic elongate naris of trematopids was undertaken using primarily material from Phonerpeton by Dilkes in 1993. In 1998, the first trematopid from Europe, Tambachia trogallas, from the early Permian Bromacker quarry in Germany was named by a team led by American paleontologist Stuart Sumida of California State University, San Bernardino.

=== 21st-century history ===
The 21st century has seen a renewed flurry of research into trematopids. In 2010, a team led by Berman described a new taxon from the late Carboniferous of Pennsylvania, Fedexia striegeli, named after the FedEx Corporation on whose land the holotype was found and after Adam Striegel, the discoverer. In 2011, another team led by Berman described a new taxon from the Bromacker quarry, Rotaryus gothae, named after the Rotary Club of Gotha's contributions to the excavation of the locality. Also in 2011, Canadian paleontologists Brendan Polley and Reisz named a new species of Acheloma from the early Permian Richards Spur locality in Oklahoma, Acheloma dunni, named for Brent Dunn, one of the collectors at the locality. A study examining development changes in this species was published the previous year by Canadian paleontologists Hillary C. Maddin, Jason S. Anderson, and Reisz, although the species name was not formalized by the time of that publication. In their 2014 review of the earlier temnospondyls, Schoch & Milner resurrected a second species of Phonerpeton, P. whitei, following Olson's original species distinctions. Data from the pes of Acheloma cumminsi was included in a broader survey of the carpus and tarsus in temnospondyls by Dilkes in 2015. In 2018, British paleontologist Andrew R. Milner revised the Nýřany trematopids, clarifying the complicated history of Mordex calliprepes and erecting a new taxon, Mattauschia laticeps. In 2019, a team led by American paleontologist Bryan M. Gee published the first description of computed tomography (CT) data of a trematopid in the form of a small specimen from the Richards Spur locality that they referred to cf. Acheloma.

== Anatomy ==
Trematopids have typically been identified by the presence of a noticeably enlarged naris that is often sub-divided in Permian forms such as Acheloma. They are also among the largest of the dissorophoids, with some specimens of Acheloma exceeding 18 cm in skull length and thus being rivaled only by middle Permian dissorophids such as Anakamacops. Schoch & Milner (2014) diagnosed trematopids by the following features: (1) greatly expanded naris replacing much of the lacrimal; (2) medially situated narial flange meeting antorbital bar; (3) otic notch with a ventral margin sloping at less than 45-degrees in large individuals; (4) a medial inflection of the rim of the adductor fossa; (5) a pterygoid-vomer contact; (6) a triangular patch of denticles on the basal plate of the parasphenoid; and (7) a humerus with a supinator process. Milner (2018) further refined this based on his restudy of Mordex, including only characters 1, 3, and 5 from Schoch & Milner (2014), noting that some typical trematopid features are either not known or are not present in the primitive Mattauschia and Mordex.

The function of the naris remains largely unresolved. Olson (1941) suggested that the anterior half served the typical function of smell detection and that the posterior half housed some kind of gland. Bolt (1974) conjectured that the well-developed nasal flange was probably for distribution of stresses throughout the skull and might be a hallmark of terrestrial dissorophoids. He then suggested that there might be a gland related to salt excretion (the "glandula nasalis externa") that would produce the enlargement of the naris. Dilkes (1993) did not discount this hypothesis, but suggested alternatives, namely that the nasal flange and the expanded naris may have been for another physiological function, such as improving respiratory efficiency and water retention, an important attribute for a terrestrial amphibian to have. However, all of these hypotheses remain speculative in the absence of much complexity of the hard tissues surrounding the naris and given the relatively vague paleoecological information available for trematopids (e.g., diet).

== Relationships ==
The placement of trematopids within Dissorophoidea has long been accepted, as has their close relationship to dissorophids, although Olsoniformes was not formalized until 2007. Ecolsonia and Mordex have been more uncertainly placed in their history of study, but both are now accepted as unequivocal trematopids. The two most recent phylogenetic analyses of Trematopidae are those by Berman et al. (2011) and Polley & Reisz (2011):

Topology of Berman et al. (2011):

- - Amphibamidae
    - - Eoscopus
      - - Amphibamus
        - Doleserpeton
    - - Micropholis
      - Tersomius
  - Olsoniformes
    - Ecolsonia
    - Dissorophidae
      - Broiliellus
      - Dissorophus
      - - Aspidosaurus
        - Cacops
    - Trematopidae
      - - Fedexia
        - - Anconastes
          - Tambachia
      - - Rotaryus
        - - Acheloma
          - Phonerpeton

Topology of Polley & Reisz (2011):

- - Sclerocephalus haeuseri
  - Micromelerpeton credneri
  - - Micropholis stowi
    - - Eoscopus lockardi
      - Olsoniformes
        - Cacops morrisi
        - Trematopidae
          - Phonerpeton pricei
          - - - Acheloma cumminsi
              - Acheloma dunni
            - - Actiobates peabodyi
              - - Ecolsonia cutlerensis
                - - Anconastes vesperus
                  - Tambachia trogallas

== Gallery ==
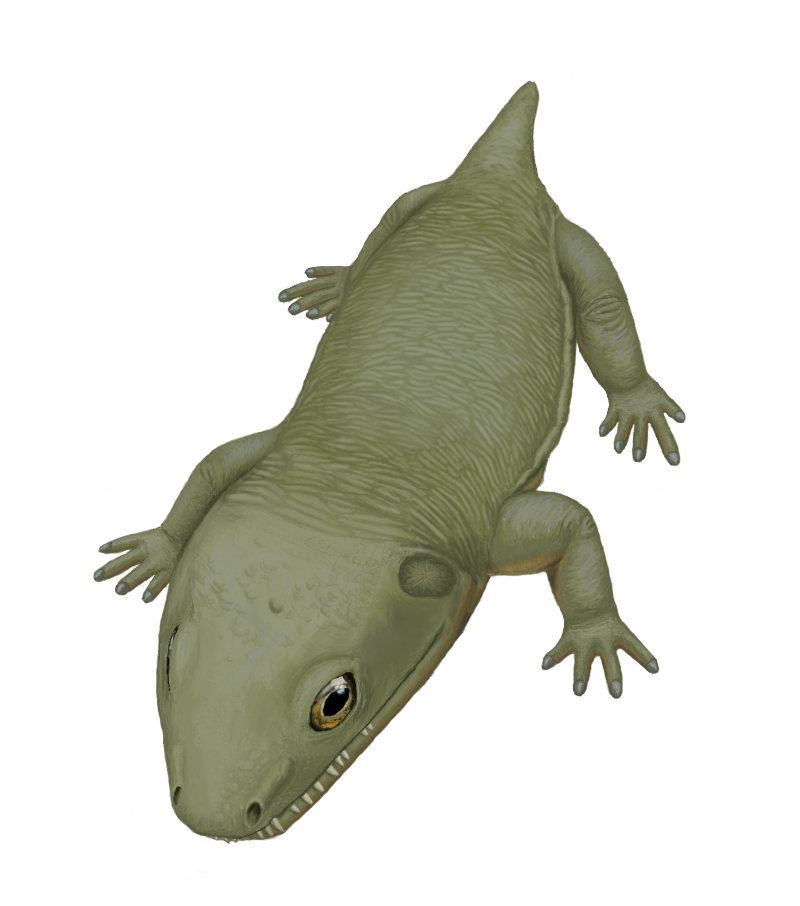
Anconastes vesperus, of the late Carboniferous of New Mexico

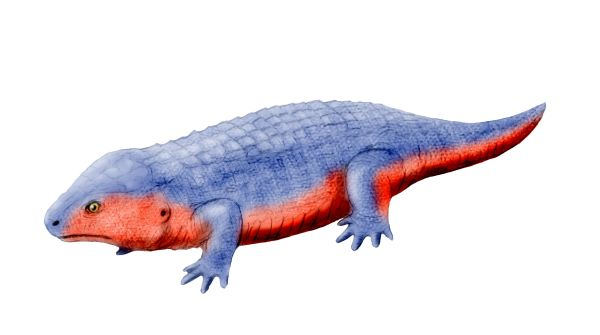
Fedexia striegeli, of the late Carboniferous of Pennsylvania

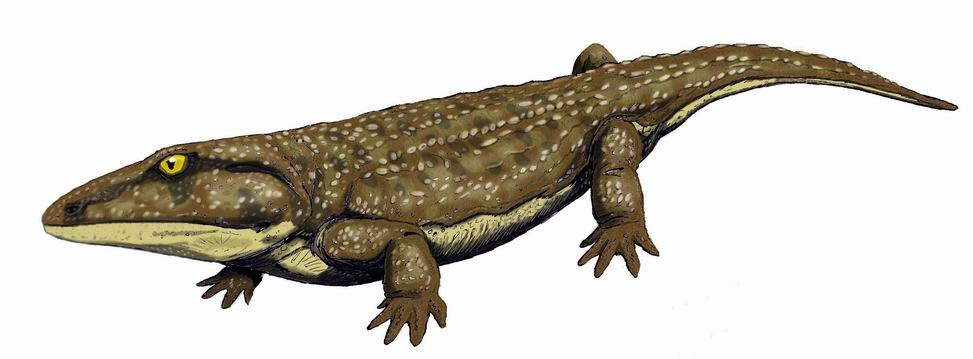
Acheloma cumminsi, of the early Permian of North America

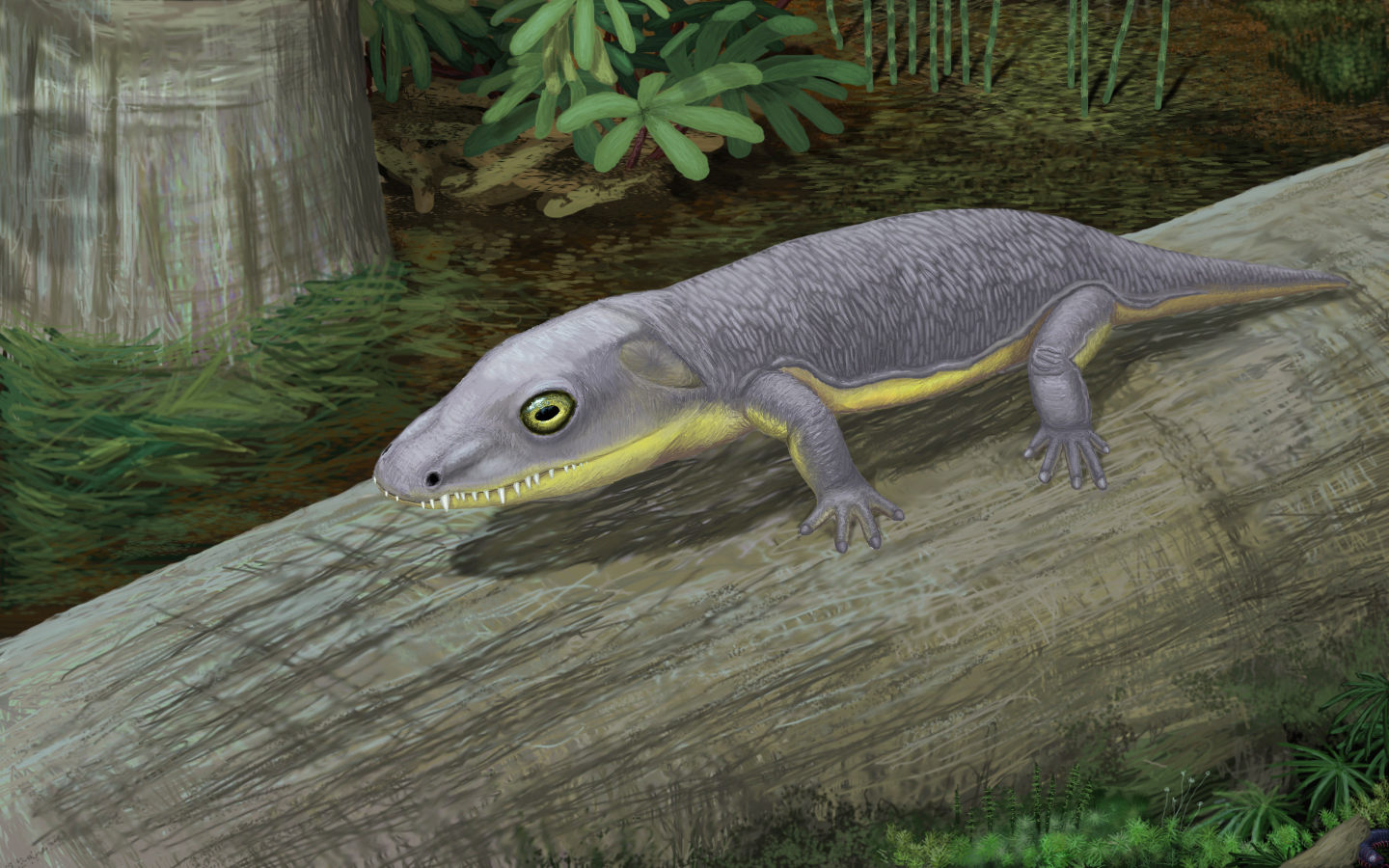
Phonerpeton pricei, of the early Permian of Texas

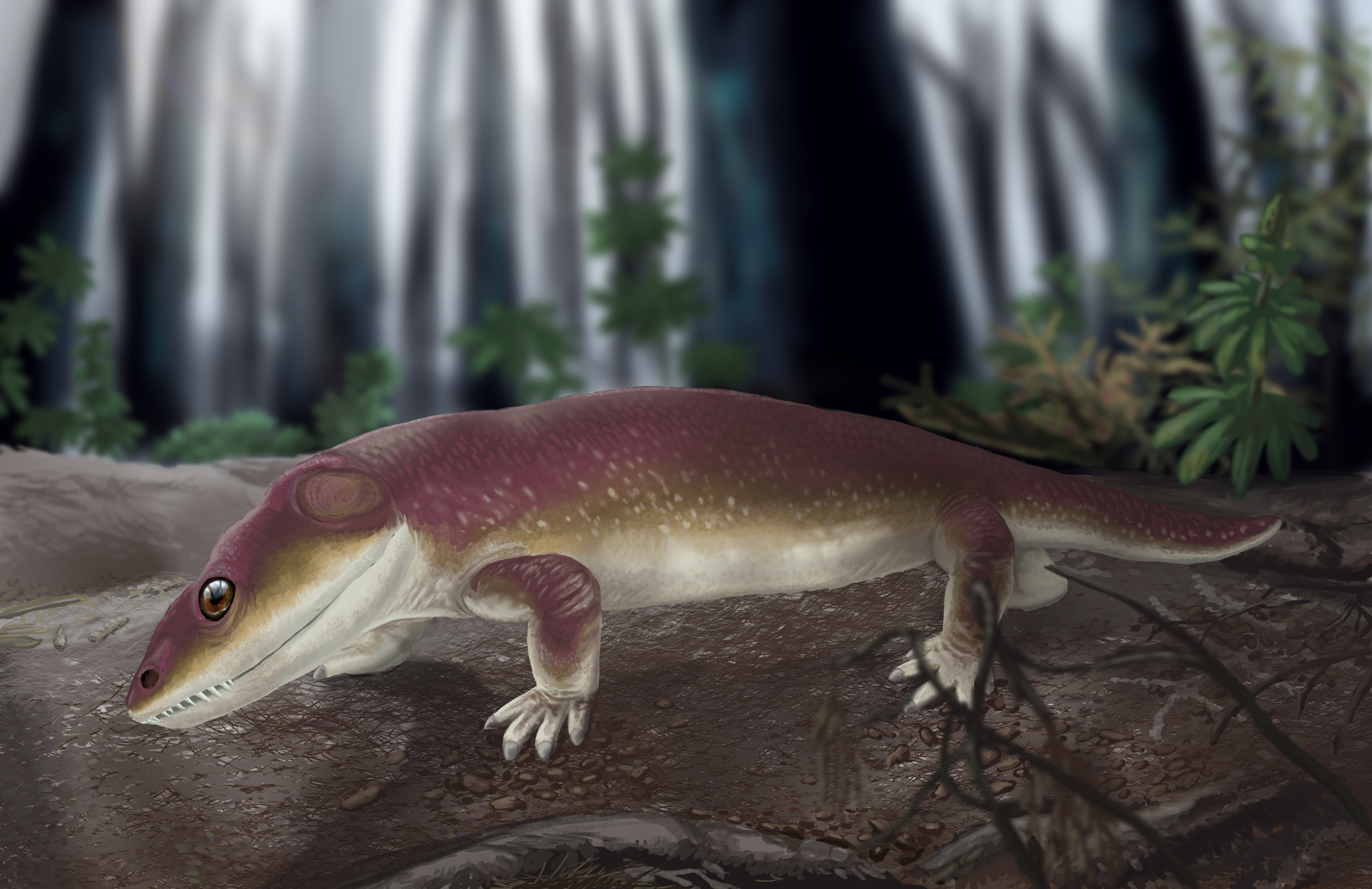
Rotaryus gothae, of the early Permian of Germany

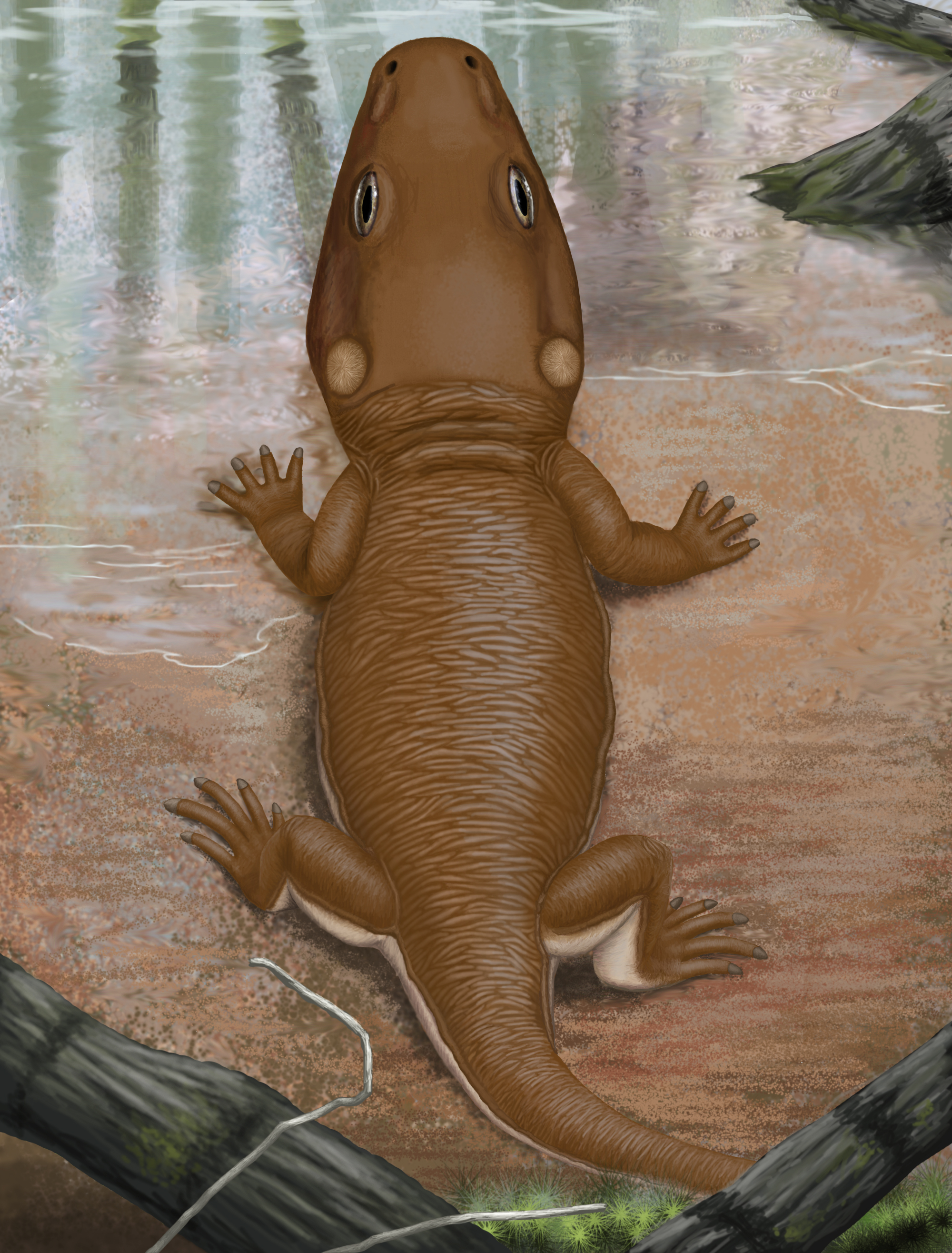
Tambachia trogallas, of the early Permian of Germany
