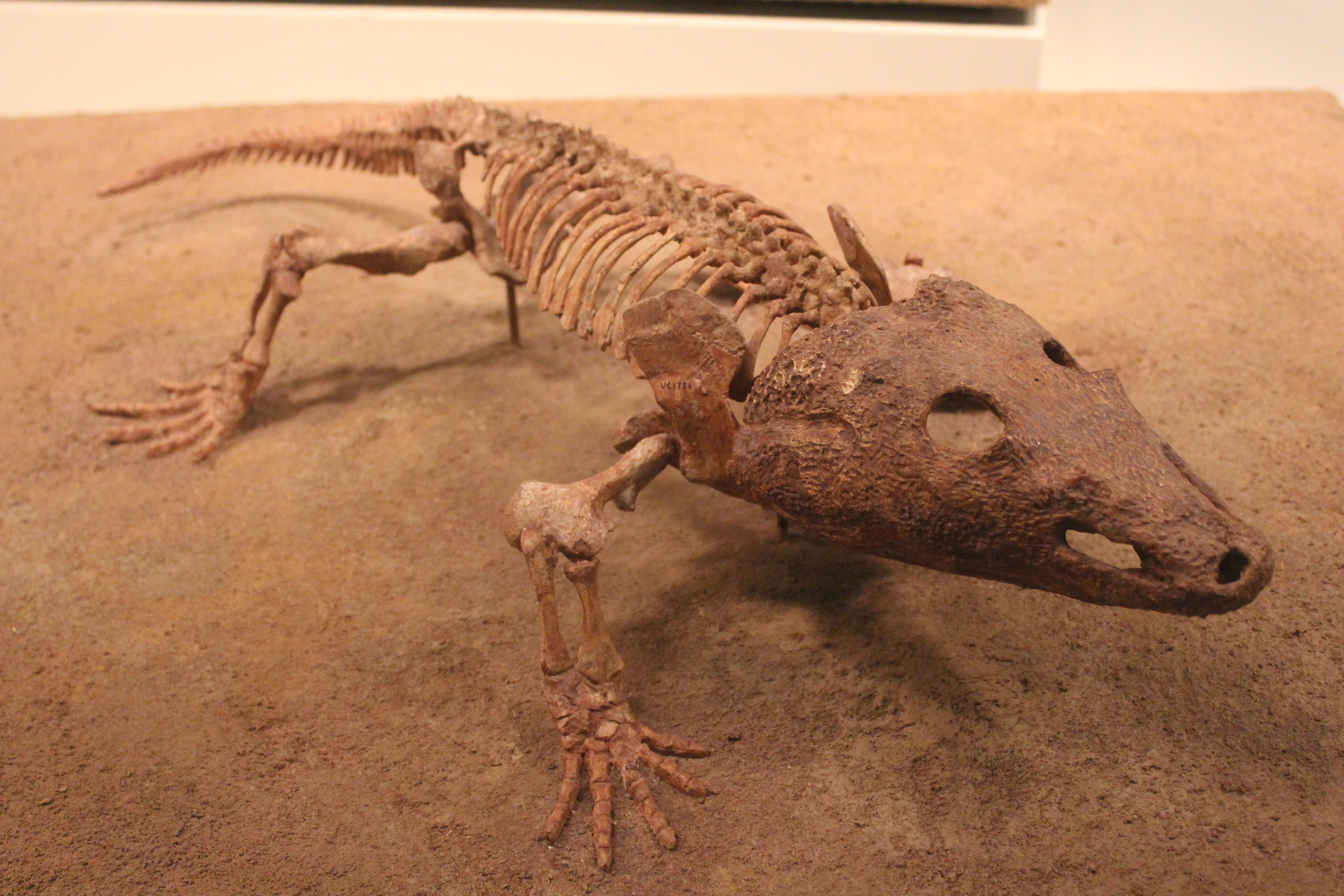
- Skeletal mount of A. cumminsi, Field Museum of Natural History

Scientific classification
- Kingdom: Animalia
- Phylum: Chordata
- Clade: Tetrapoda
- Order: †Temnospondyli
- Family: †Trematopidae
- Genus: †Acheloma; Cope, 1882

Species
- A. cryptatheria Osterling Arias et al., 2024; A. cumminsi Cope, 1882 (type species); A. dunni Polley & Reisz, 2011

Synonyms
- Trematops milleri Williston, 1909 Trematops thomasi Mehl, 1926 Trematops willistoni Olson, 1941 Trematops stonei Williston, 1970

= Acheloma =

Acheloma Temporal range: Early Permian, 279.5–272.5 Ma

Extinct genus of amphibians

Acheloma (also known as Trematops milleri) is an extinct genus of temnospondyl that lived during the Early Permian. The type species is A. cumminsi.

== History of study ==
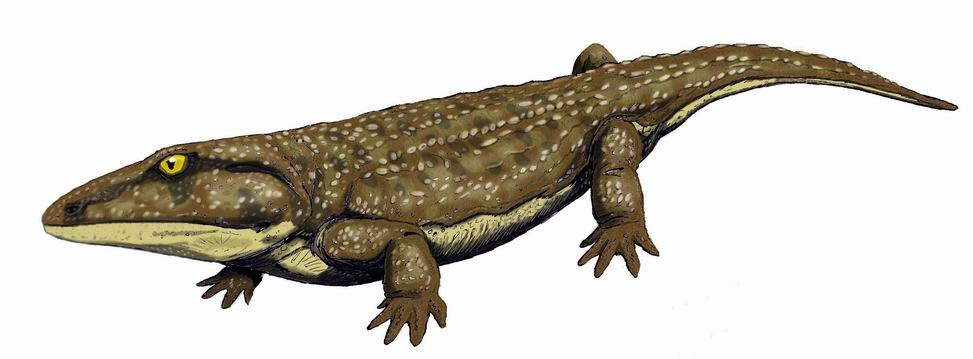
Restoration of A. cumminsi

Acheloma was named by Edward Drinker Cope in 1882 based on a partial skull with associated postcranial elements from the Arroyo Formation of Texas; the specimen is currently reposited at the American Museum of Natural History in New York. Subsequent discoveries of large trematopids from the Arroyo Formation were named as different species of Trematops (T. milleri, T. willistoni), but these have since been synonymized with Acheloma cumminsi. Trematops stonei from the Washington Formation of Ohio and Trematops thomasi from Oklahoma have also been synonymized with A. cumminsi. A second species of Acheloma was described by Polley & Reisz (2011) from the Richards Spur locality in Oklahoma.

A 2020 paper by Gee synonymized A. dunni with A. cumminsi, suggesting that ontogeny may account for the differences in specimens. However, the 2024 paper from Osterling Arias et al., which established the new species A. cryptatheria from a reexamined block of Richards Spur material, resurrected the species of A. dunni based on considerations of internal skull morphology.

== Anatomy ==
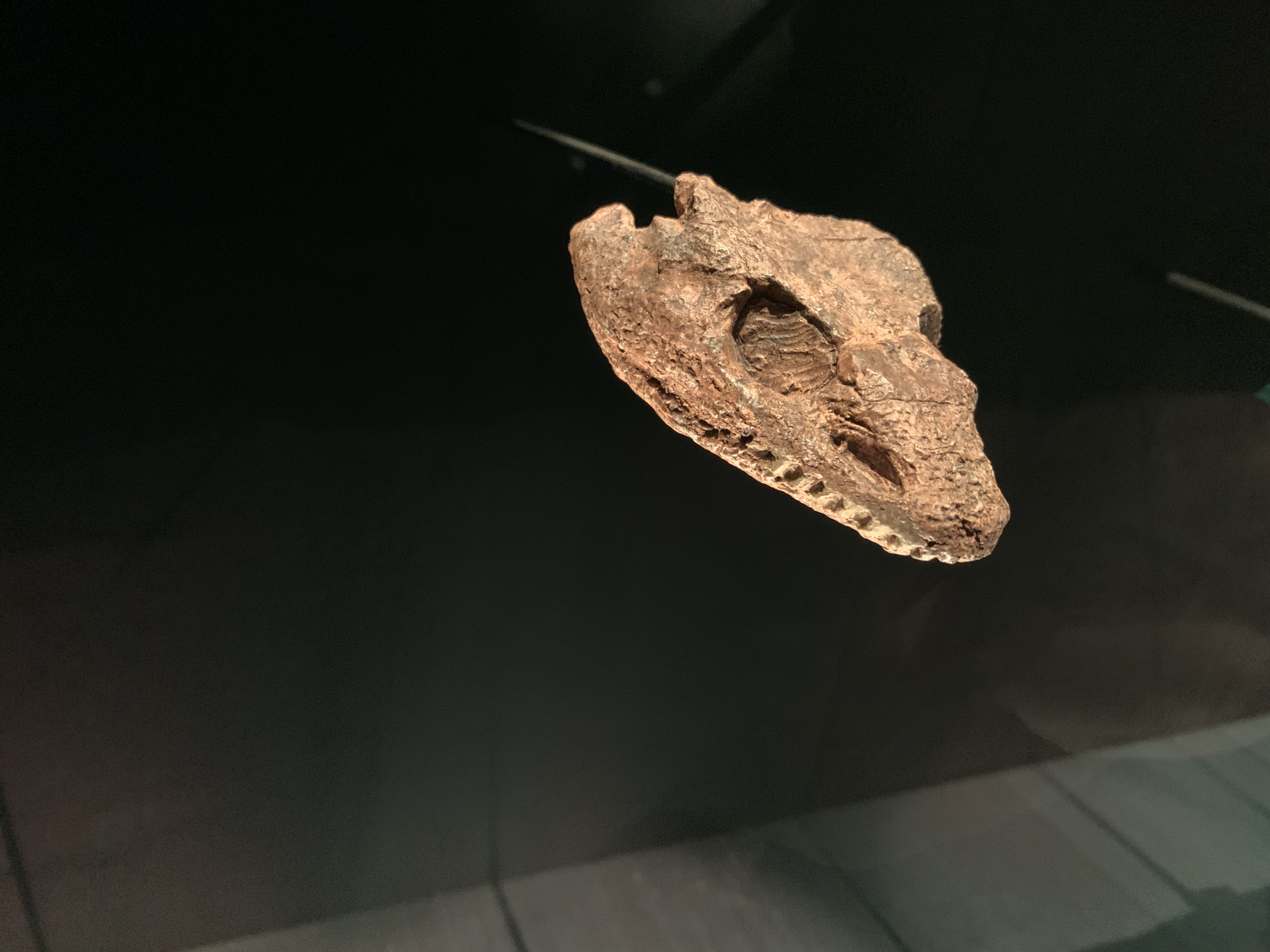
Skull cast at the Royal Tyrrell Museum

Schoch & Milner (2014) provide nine characters in their diagnosis of Acheloma: (1) toothed crest on the vomer extending medial to the internal naris; (2) constricted otic notch with nearly horizontal ventral margin; (3) preorbital region twice as long as the skull table; (4) naris twice as long as the orbit; (5) posterior skull table wide and posterolaterally expanded; (6) skull margin widens at level of and posterior to orbit; (7) palatine and ectopterygoid with tall fangs; (8) large intervomerine fenestra; and (9) choana elongate and curved with a Y-shaped contour.

Acheloma cumminsi and A. dunni are distinguished by the purported absence of lateral exposures of the palatine (LEP) and the ectopterygoid (LEE) in A. cumminsi, but these exposures were subsequently identified following re-examination of the holotype of this taxon.

== Ecology ==
Various analyses have confirmed hypotheses that Acheloma was a terrestrial temnospondyl.

== Phylogeny ==
The following cladogram shows the phylogenetic position of Acheloma, from Polley & Reisz, 2011.

- Dissorophoidea
  - Sclerocephalus haeuseri
  - Micromelerpeton credneri
  - - Micropholis stowi
    - - Eoscopus lockardi
      - Olsoniformes
        - Cacops morrisi
        - Trematopidae
          - Phonerpeton pricei
          - - Acheloma
              - Acheloma cumminsi
              - Acheloma dunni
            - - Actiobates peabodyi
              - - Ecolsonia cutlerensis
                - - Anconastes vesperus
                  - Tambachia trogallas
