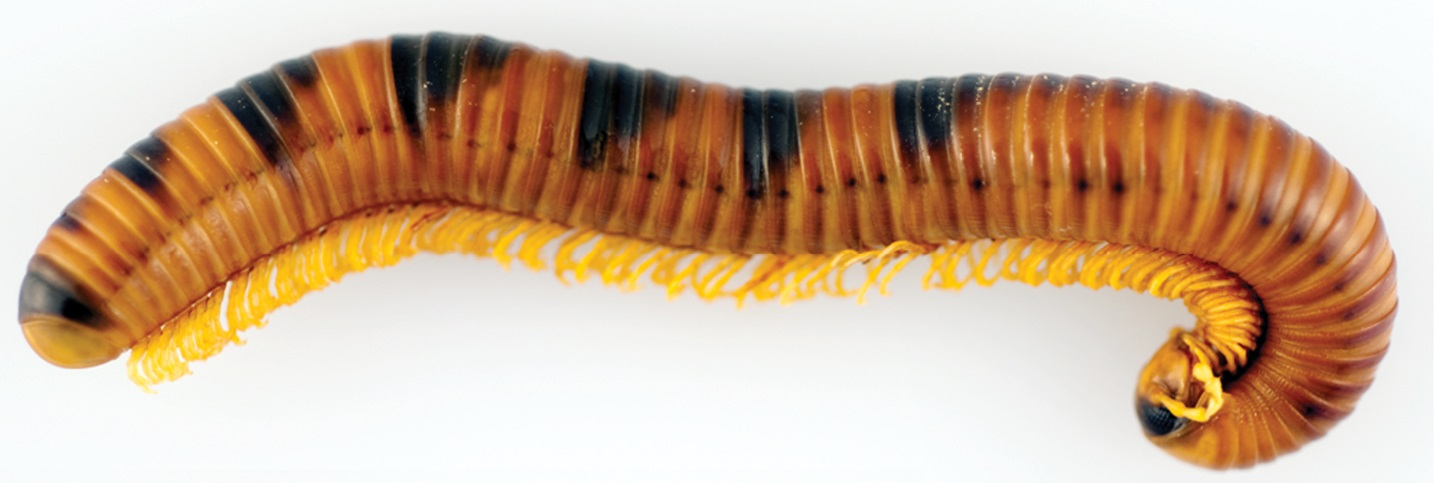
- Sagmatostreptus strongylopygus (Spirostreptidae) from Tanzania

Scientific classification
- Domain: Eukaryota
- Kingdom: Animalia
- Phylum: Arthropoda
- Subphylum: Myriapoda
- Class: Diplopoda
- Subclass: Chilognatha
- Infraclass: Helminthomorpha
- Subterclass: Eugnatha
- Superorder: Juliformia; Attems, 1926

Orders
- Julida; Spirobolida; Spirostreptida

Synonyms
- Opisthospermophora Verhoeff, 1900

= Juliformia =

Juliformia Temporal range: Devonian–Recent

Suborder of millipedes

Juliformia is a taxonomic superorder of millipedes containing three living orders: Julida, Spirobolida, and Spirostreptida, and the extinct group Xyloiuloidea known only from fossils.

== Morphology ==
The species possess long cylindrical bodies with sclerites (skeletal plates consisting of ventral sternites, lateral pleurites, and dorsal tergites) fused into complete rings. Juliform millipedes possess defensive repugnatorial glands on all body segments except the last few, and are the only known millipedes to produce quinones in their defensive secretions. Juliform males have two pairs of gonopods consisting of the modified 8th and 9th pair of legs: in Julida and Spirobolida the posterior gonopods (9th leg pair) are primarily involved in sperm-transferring, while in Spirostreptida it is the anterior gonopods (8th leg pair). Juliformians also lack Tömösváry organs and have a large collum (first body segment) which overhangs the rear of the head.

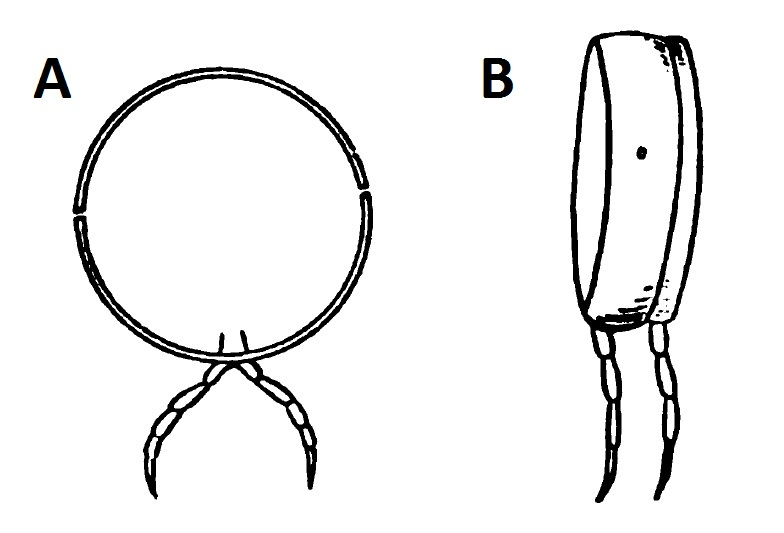
Simplified cross section (A) and side view (B) of a juliform millipede segment

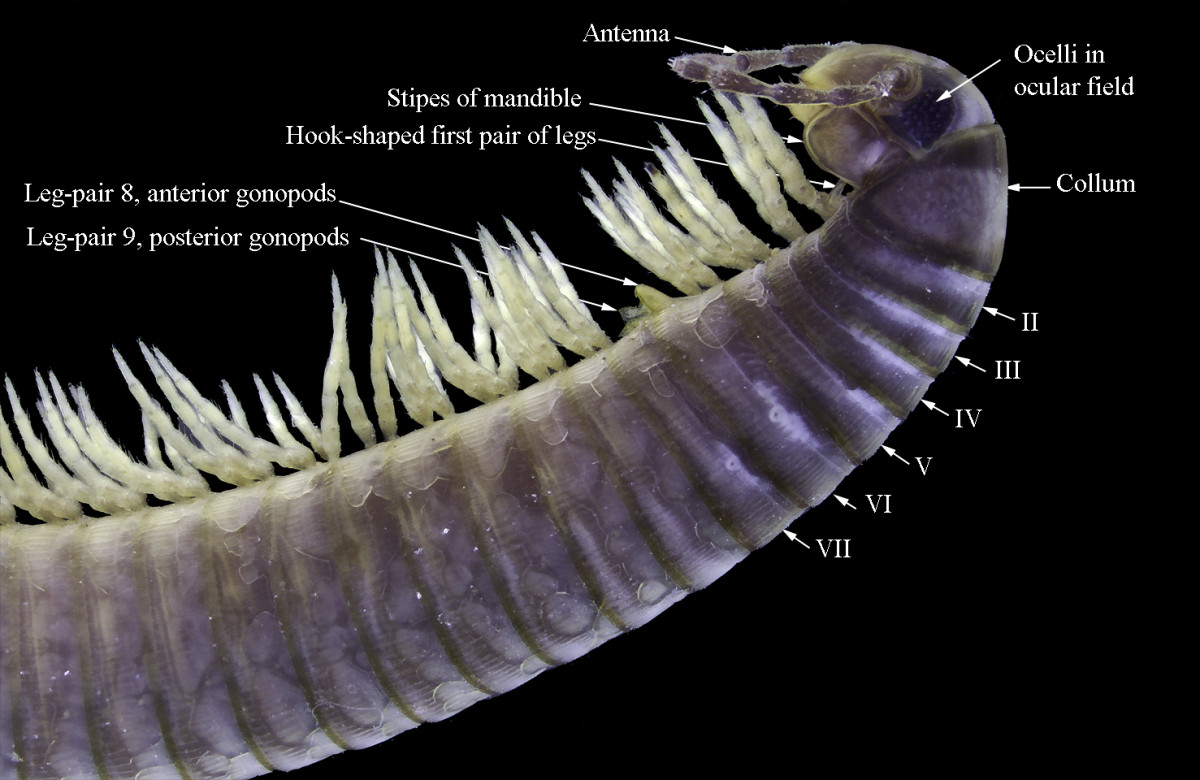
Male Ommatoiulus moreleti (Julida, Julidae) showing juliform characteristics: large collum, two pair of gonopods, and fused, cylindrical body segments. The hook-shaped first leg pair is unique to Julida.

== Taxonomy ==
The Xyloiuloidea is an extinct superfamily of fossil millipedes of uncertain placement within the Juliformia. Known from the Lower Devonian to the Upper Pennsylvanian, Xyloiuloidea consists of four families and several genera. The group was formerly considered a suborder of Spirobolida, but newly discovered species in 2006 required a reconsideration of classification, and the order to which Xyloiuloidea belongs remains undetermined.
