= Mattauschia =

Mattauschia Temporal range: Late Carboniferous, 311.45–306.95 Ma

Scientific classification
- Kingdom: Animalia
- Phylum: Chordata
- Clade: Tetrapoda
- Order: †Temnospondyli
- Family: †Trematopidae
- Genus: †Mattauschia; Milner, 2018

Type species
- Mattauschia laticeps (Fritsch, 1881)

Extinct genus of amphibians

Mattauschia is an extinct genus of trematopid temnospondyls from the Late Carboniferous of the Czech Republic.

== Taxonomy ==
The type species of Mattauschia, M. laticeps, was named Limnerpeton laticeps by Fritsch (1881) for a small post-metamorphic specimen from Late Carboniferous coal deposits in the Czech Republic. Milner and Sequeira (2003) synonymized it and the nominal species Limnerpeton macrolepis with Mordex calliprepes, interpreting them as representing growth stages of one trematopid species. Milner (2018) eventually recognized laticeps as distinct from the M. calliprepes holotype, so he erected Mattauschia for laticeps, which includes the lectotype specimen NMP M470/471 as well as the paralectotype NMP M639 and Limnerpeton macrolepis lectotype NMP M472.

== See also ==
- Prehistoric amphibian
- List of prehistoric amphibians
