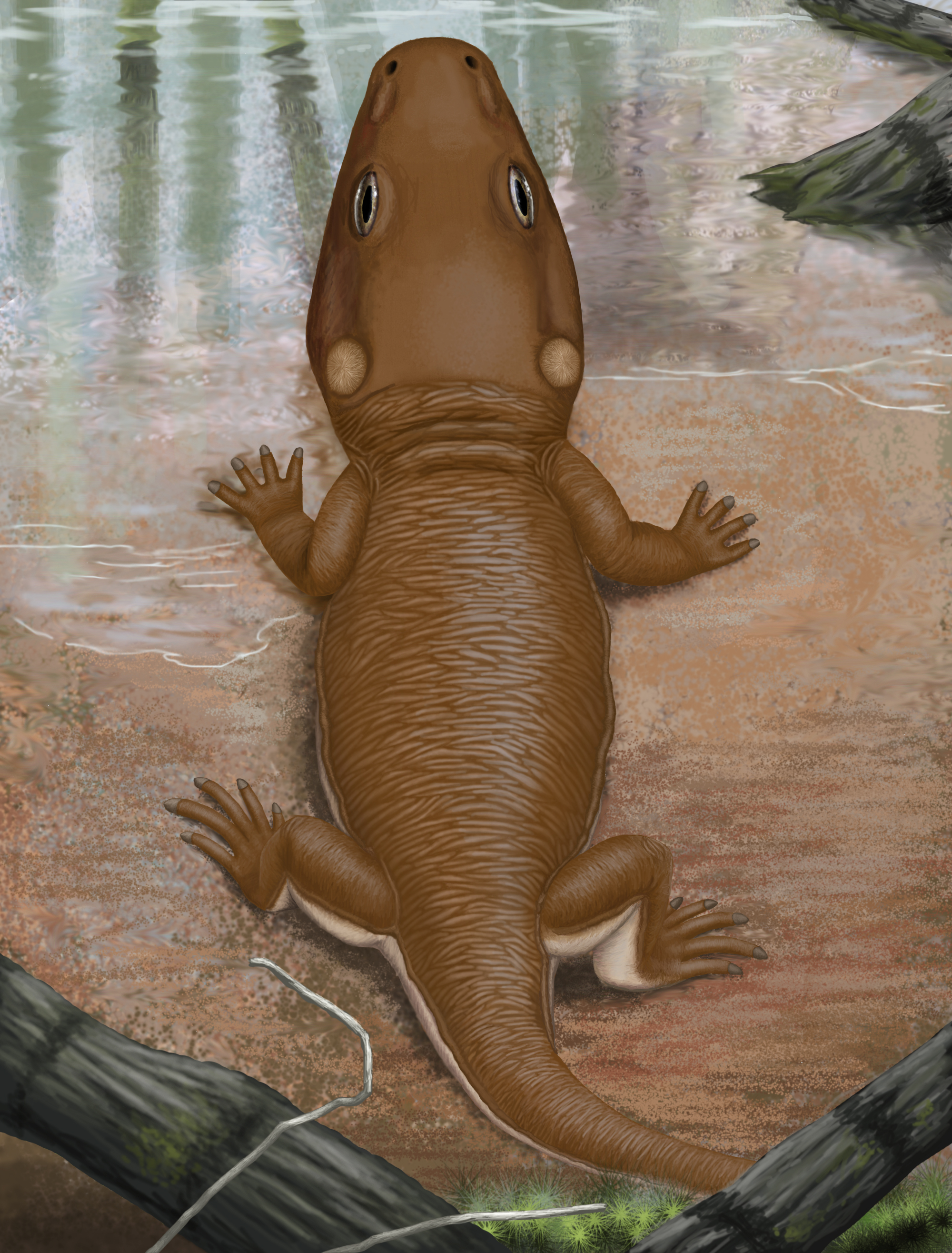

Scientific classification
- Kingdom: Animalia
- Phylum: Chordata
- Clade: Tetrapoda
- Order: †Temnospondyli
- Family: †Trematopidae
- Genus: †Tambachia; Sumida et al., 1998

Type species
- †Tambachia trogallas Sumida et al., 1998

= Tambachia =

Tambachia Temporal range: Early Permian, 284–279.5 Ma

Extinct genus of amphibians

Tambachia is an extinct genus of dissorophoid temnospondyl within the family Trematopidae. It is known from the Early Permian Tambach Formation (the lowermost unit of the Upper Rotliegend) near the town of Tambach-Dietharz in Thuringia, Germany. Tambachia is the first trematopid to have been discovered outside the United States.

== Discovery ==
The holotype specimen of Tambachia trogallas, known as MNG 7722, has been found from an outcrop of the Tambach Formation at the Bromacker locality in the Thuringian Forest of central Germany. It consists of a skull and much of the postcranial skeleton. The only major portion of the skeleton that is missing is the presacral vertebral column. The Bromacker locality is a sandstone quarry that is well known for tetrapod trackways and articulated skeletons of terrestrial and semiterrestrial amphibians and reptiles. MNG 7722 was found in red-bed fluvial deposits consisting of well consolidated mudstones in flat-bedded channel fills.

Although it is difficult to determine the maturity of MNG 7722, it is thought to be an early adult. Poor ossification of the carpals, tarsals, and endochondral portion of the braincase suggest that MNG 7722 represents an early stage of development, while the pitted skull roof, with tightly closed sutures between bones, indicates a mature individual.

The name Tambachia refers to the Tambach Formation. The specific name of T. trogallas is derived from the Greek trogo, meaning munch or nibble, and allas, meaning sausage. The name refers to the Thuringian bratwurst that was frequently eaten in the Bromacker Quarry by the authors who described the species.

== Description ==
The skull of MNG 7722 is severely crushed dorsoventrally, making it hard to determine the shape of the skull in lateral view. It is 6.9 centimetres (2.7 in) in length, which is small for a trematopid. The orbits, or eye sockets, are centrally placed so that the preorbital length of the skull is equal to that of the postorbital length. They make up around 30% of the skull length. The skull table seems to extend posteriorly past the level of the jaw articulation in Tambachia, which is unique among trematopids. However, this is likely to have been the result of crushing of the skull, which displaced the skull table.

Tambachia, like other trematopids, likely possessed a salt gland similar to those seen in modern reptiles. The subdivision of the external naris into anterior and posterior portions is evidence of the presence of salt glands. The anterior portion is sub-circular and is thought to be the true narial opening. The posterior portion likely held the salt gland. The expansion of the posterior portion may not be an accommodation for the salt gland, but rather a means of coping with cranial stresses during feeding.

The postcranial skeleton is well known in Tambachia, given the completeness of the holotype specimen. The relatively short tail, preserved only as a faint impression in MNG 7722, is 8.5 centimetres (3.3 in) long. The limbs are short, with four digits on the manus, or hand, and five digits on the pes, or foot. It is possible that the manus possessed five digits, since Acheloma, another closely related trematopid, has been described as having five distal carpals. In the pes of the holotype specimen, there are only four digits preserved. However, since the third preserved digit is the longest, it likely represents the fourth digit, with the first digit absent due to imperfect preservation. The terminal phalanges of Tambachia were narrow, and would have been the core supports of claws.

== Classification ==
In the original description of Tambachia, Sumida et al. (1998) concluded that Anconastes was the closest relative of Tambachia. Characteristics that supported this relationship included the absence of an internarial fenestra (which is also seen in dissorophids, but was interpreted as a convergent trait), the reduction of the suborbital process of the lacrimal, and a contribution to the ventral orbital rim (the rim of the eye socket) by the maxilla rather than the palatine. Below is a cladogram modified from Sumida et al. (1998) showing the proposed relationships of Tambachia and other trematopids:

- Trematopidae
  - - Tambachia
    - Anconastes
  - - Phonerpeton
    - Acheloma

In their description of Fedexia, Berman et al. (2010) placed Fedexia as the sister taxon of the clade containing Tambachia and Anconastes. Tambachia, Anconastes, and Fedexia all possess a shallow and broadly concave occipital margin. In other trematopids, the margin is biconcave. Below is a cladogram modified from Berman et al. (2010):

- Trematopidae
  - - Fedexia
    - - Tambachia
      - Anconastes
  - - Phonerpeton
    - Acheloma
