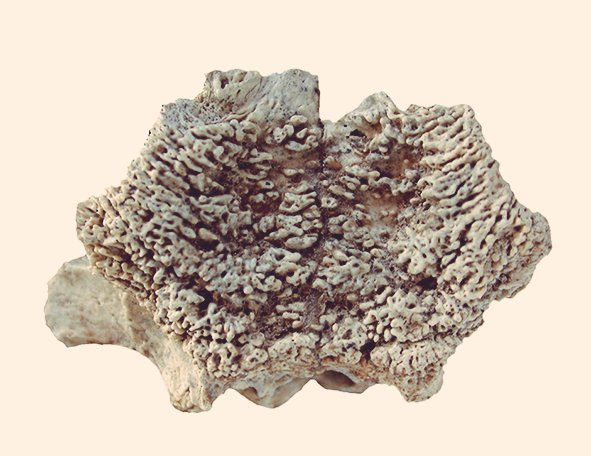
- Rhinella loba - Partial fossil skull (holotype) in dorsal view

Scientific classification
- Kingdom: Animalia
- Phylum: Chordata
- Class: Amphibia
- Order: Anura
- Family: Bufonidae
- Genus: Rhinella
- Species: †R. loba

Binomial name
- †Rhinella loba Pérez-Ben, Gómez, Báez, 2019

= Rhinella loba =

Rhinella loba Temporal range: late Pliocene

Extinct species of amphibian

Rhinella loba is an extinct true toad that inhabited the South American Pampas during the late Pliocene (ca. 3.5 million years ago). It is closely related to the present day Argentine toad Rhinella arenarum and represents to date the only diagnosable extinct true toad species from South America.

== Provenance ==
Rhinella loba takes its name from the locality of Punta Lobería from which it comes, one of several fossil-yielding localities in the coastal cliffs along the southern shoreline of Buenos Aires Province, Argentina. The type material come from upper stratigraphic levels of the Chapadmalal Formation (late Pliocene).

== Description ==
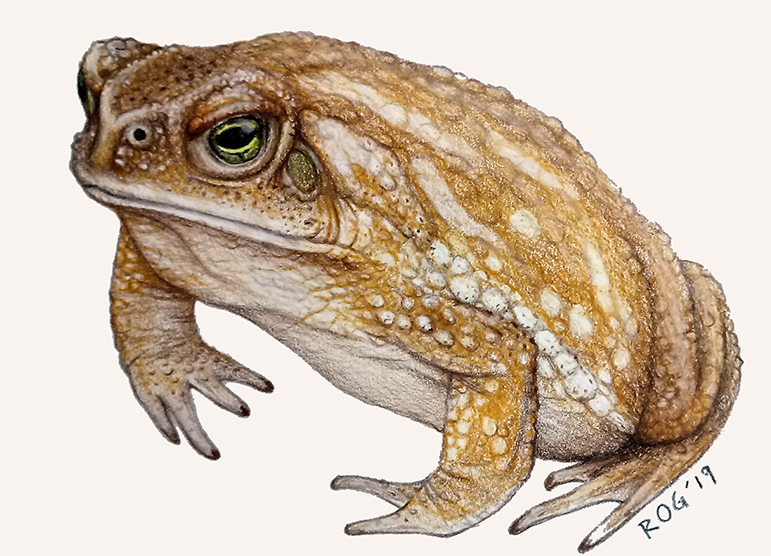
Rhinella loba - Life restoration (by Raúl Orencio Gómez)

Rhinella loba is a large true toad with a very broad skull roof. Their thick roofing bones are heavily ornamented with tubercles and projected onto the orbits through poorly inclined crests. These features jointly occur only in the Argentine toad among the species of the Rhinella marina group, but this living toad has a distinctly narrower skull roof. In life it would have looked like a large Argentine toad but with a broader head as that of the cururu toad.
