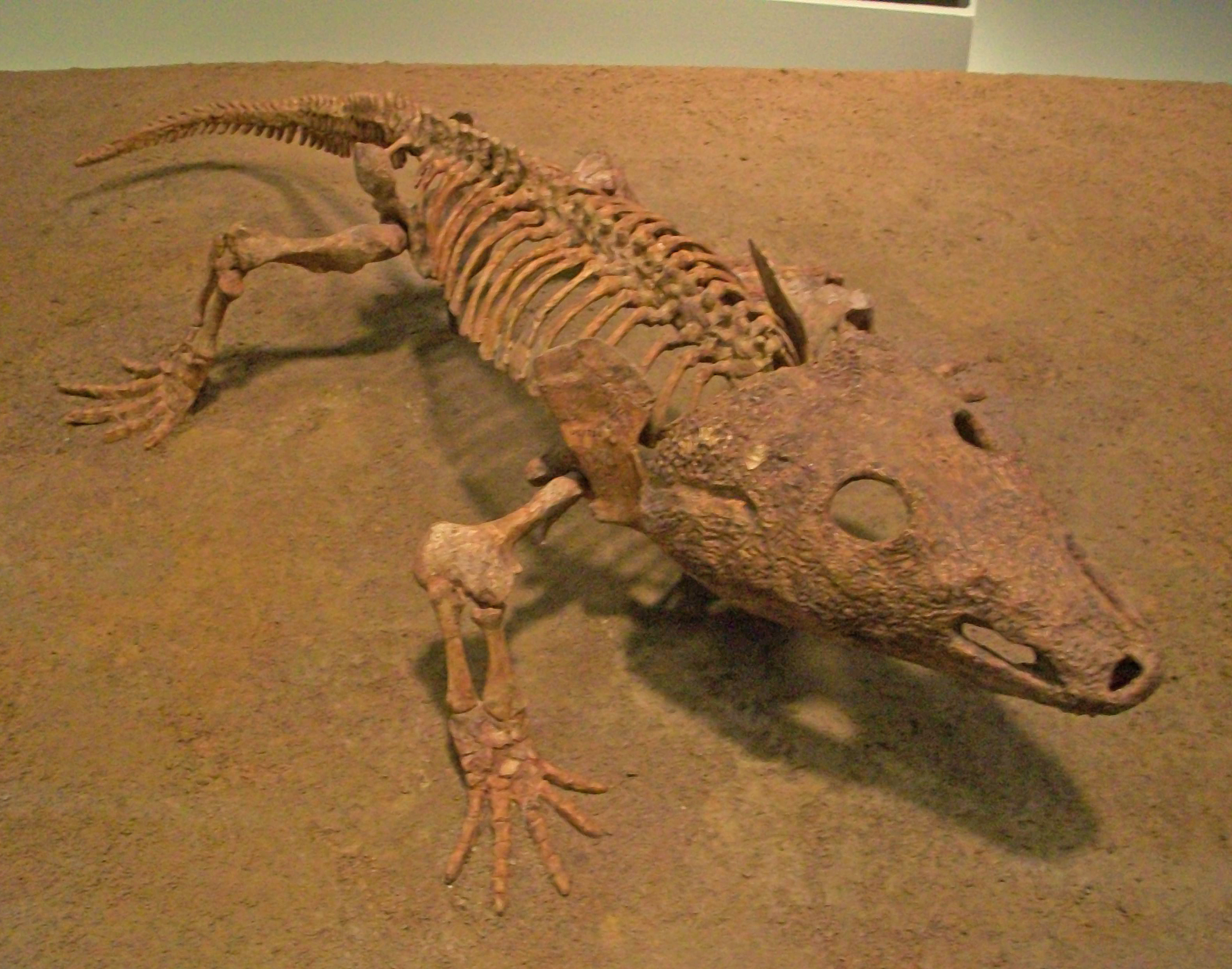
- Skeleton of Acheloma cumminsi

Scientific classification
- Kingdom: Animalia
- Phylum: Chordata
- Clade: Tetrapoda
- Order: †Temnospondyli
- Superfamily: †Dissorophoidea
- Clade: †Olsoniformes; Anderson et al., 2008

= Olsoniformes =

Olsoniformes Temporal range: Late Carboniferous - Late Permian

Taxon of temnospondyl amphibians (fossil)

Olsoniformes is an extinct clade of dissorophoid temnospondyls, including the families Dissorophidae and Trematopidae. Most members of the clade were highly adapted to a terrestrial lifestyle. The clade was named in 2008 and is defined as the least inclusive clade containing Dissorophus multicinctus (a dissorophid) and Acheloma cumminsi (a trematopid) but not Amphibamus grandiceps, Micromelerpeton credneri, or Apateon pedestris. Olsoniforms share various features such as a stout and low ilium and a thin cultriform process. The earliest-branching olsoniform is Palodromeus bairdi, from the Late Carboniferous of Ohio.

Trematopids are known from the Late Carboniferous and the Early Permian of Europe and across much of North America, while dissorophids are primarily found in Early Permian deposits in the central United States, extending into the Middle-Late Permian in Eurasia.

Below is a cladogram from Schoch (2018) showing the phylogenetic position of Olsoniformes within the Dissorophoidea:

- Dissorophoidea
  - Micromelerpetontidae
  - Xerodromes
    - Olsoniformes
      - Trematopidae
      - Dissorophidae
    - Amphibamiformes
      - - Platyrhinops
        - Eoscopus
      - - Micropholidae
        - - Amphibamidae
          - - Branchiosauridae
            - - Gerobatrachus
              - Lissamphibia
