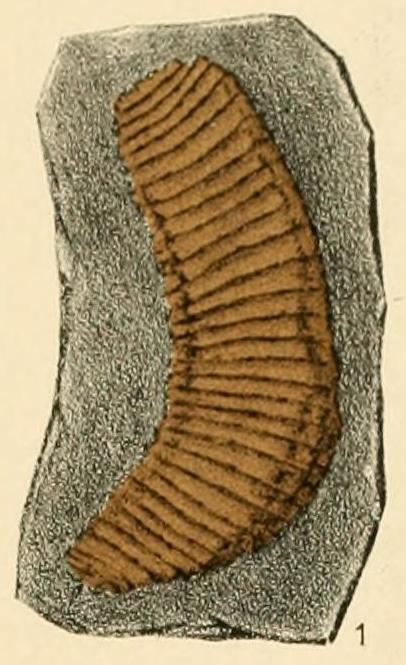
- Purkynia lata

Scientific classification
- Kingdom: Animalia
- Phylum: Arthropoda
- Subphylum: Myriapoda
- Class: Diplopoda
- Subclass: Chilognatha
- Order: †Zosterogrammida; Wilson, 2005
- Family: †Zosterogrammidae; Wilson, 2005

Genera
- Casiogrammus; Purkynia; Zosterogrammus

= Zosterogrammidae =

Zosterogrammidae Temporal range: Wenlock–Westphalian

Extinct family of millipedes

Zosterogrammidae is an extinct family of millipedes containing three genera, each with a single species. Fossils are known from the Czech Republic, Scotland, and the USA. Zosterogrammidae constitutes the sole family of the order Zosterogrammida.

== Description ==
Zosterogrammids have broad heads, 20 to 32 body segments, with a body tapering towards the head and rear. The dorsal plates of each segment are very broad and the rear portion of each is segment ornamented with lines. Size ranges from 26 millimetres (1.0 in) to 55 millimetres (2.2 in) in length. Superficially they are similar to the living Polyzoniida in body proportion.

== Taxonomy and distribution ==
Zosterogrammidae is placed in its own order, Zosterogrammida. Zosterogrammida is considered incertae sedis (uncertain placement) within the millipede subclass Chilognatha.

Family †Zosterogrammidae Wilson, 2005

Casiogrammus ichthyeros Wilson, 2005 - Lanarkshire, Scotland; Wenlock (Silurian)
Purkynia lata Fritsch, 1899 - Nýřany, Czech Republic; Westphalian (Upper Carboniferous)
Zosterogrammus stichostethus Wilson, 2005 - Illinois, USA; Pennsylvanian (Upper Carboniferous)
