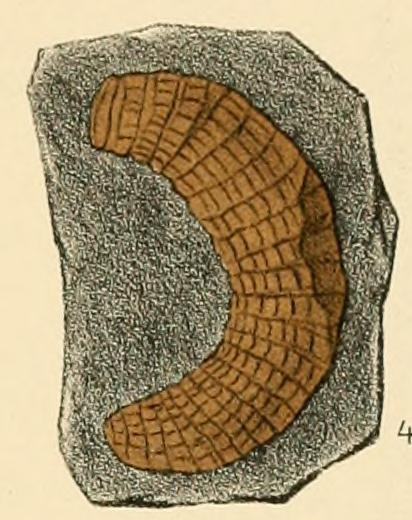
- Nyranius costulatus fossil

Scientific classification
- Kingdom: Animalia
- Phylum: Arthropoda
- Subphylum: Myriapoda
- Class: Diplopoda
- Order: incertae sedis
- Superfamily: †Xyloiuloidea
- Family: †Nyraniidae; Hoffman, 1963
- Genus: †Nyranius; Hoffman, 1969

Species
- †Nyranius costulatus (Fritsch, 1875); †Nyranius tabulatus (Fritsch, 1899)

= Nyranius =

Nyranius Temporal range: 311–307 Ma Westphalian

Extinct genus of many-legged arthropods

Nyranius is a genus of fossil millipedes from the Upper Carboniferous (Westphalian) of Europe, containing the species N. costulatus and N. tabulatus. Specimens reach up to 10mm in width, and are covered in fine grooves, similar to other members of the extinct Xyloiuloidea.
