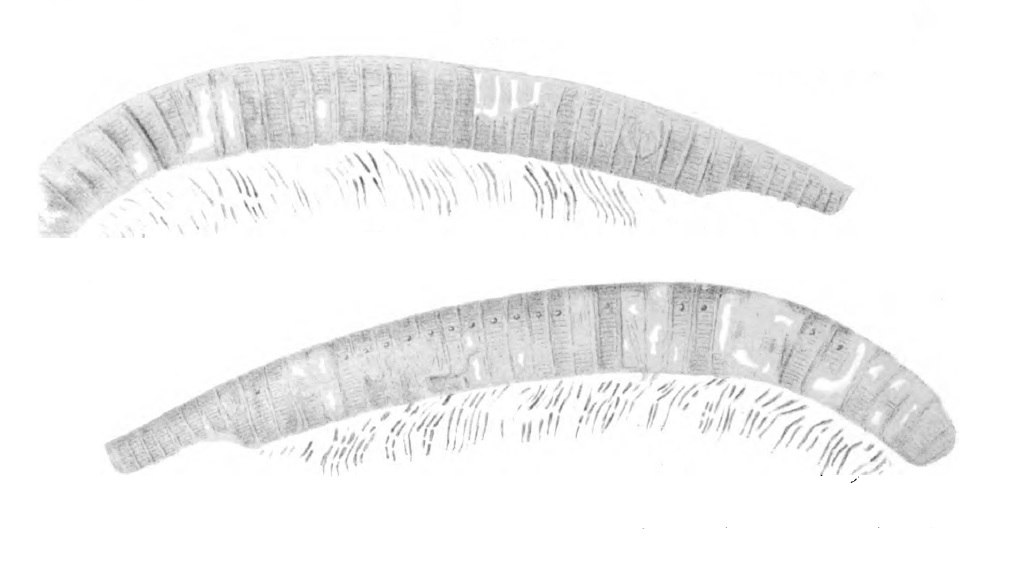
- Xyloiulus mazonus

Scientific classification
- Kingdom: Animalia
- Phylum: Arthropoda
- Subphylum: Myriapoda
- Class: Diplopoda
- Subclass: Chilognatha
- Infraclass: Helminthomorpha
- Subterclass: Eugnatha
- Superorder: Juliformia
- Order: incertae sedis
- Superfamily: †Xyloiuloidea; Cook, 1895

Families
- †Gaspestriidae; †Nyraniidae; †Plagiascetidae; †Xyloiulidae

= Xyloiuloidea =

Xyloiuloidea Temporal range: Lower Devonian–Pennsylvanian

Extinct superfamily of millipedes

Xyloiuloidea is an extinct superfamily of millipedes that existed from the Lower Devonian through the Upper Pennsylvanian period in Europe and North America.

== Description ==
Xyloiuloids are more or less cylindrical, with sternites, pleurites, and tergites of each body segment fused into a complete ring. Adults possess 40 to 50 body rings. The legs are no longer than half the height of the body. The body surface is marked by small parallel grooves (striations), which vary in surface coverage between xyloiuloid families.

== Taxonomy ==
Xyloiuloidea comprises four families:

- †Gaspestriidae
- †Nyraniidae
- †Plagiascetidae
- †Xyloiulidae

The taxonomic history of Xyloiuloidea begins with Orator F. Cook designating the family Xyloiulidae in 1895. In 1969, Richard L. Hoffman established the families Nyraniidae and Plagiascetidae, and placed all three extinct families in the extant (still-living) order Spirobolida, as suborder "Xyloiulidea". In 2006, two new species were described and placed in the new family Gaspestriidae, and group was reassigned as a superfamily of uncertain status (incertae sedis) within the juliform millipedes, a group that includes the cylindrical, fused-bodied orders Spirobolida, Spirostreptida, and Julida.
