= Purkynia =

Purkynia Temporal range: Moscovian–Kasimovian

Scientific classification
- Domain: Eukaryota
- Kingdom: Animalia
- Phylum: Arthropoda
- Subphylum: Myriapoda
- Class: Diplopoda
- Order: †Zosterogrammida
- Family: †Zosterogrammidae
- Genus: †Purkynia; Fritsch, 1899
- Species: †P. lata

Binomial name
- †Purkynia lata Fritsch, 1899

Extinct genus of millipedes

Purkynia is an extinct genus of millipede in the family Zosterogrammidae. There is one described species in Purkynia, P. lata.
