= Branchierpeton =

Scientific classification
- Kingdom: Animalia
- Phylum: Chordata
- Clade: Tetrapoda
- Order: †Temnospondyli
- Family: †Micromelerpetontidae
- Genus: †Branchierpeton; Boy, 1972

Extinct genus of amphibians

Branchierpeton is an extinct genus of dissorophoidean euskelian temnospondyl within the family Micromelerpetontidae native to Africa.

== See also ==
- List of prehistoric amphibians
