= Limnogyrinus =

Limnogyrinus Temporal range: Carboniferous–Permian, 311.45–295.0 Ma

Scientific classification
- Kingdom: Animalia
- Phylum: Chordata
- Clade: Tetrapoda
- Order: †Temnospondyli
- Family: †Micromelerpetontidae
- Genus: †Limnogyrinus; Milner, 1986

Extinct genus of temnospondyls

Limnogyrinus is an extinct genus of dissorophoidean temnospondyl within the family Micromelerpetontidae.
