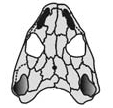
- Ecolsonia skull

Scientific classification
- Kingdom: Animalia
- Phylum: Chordata
- Clade: Tetrapoda
- Order: †Temnospondyli
- Family: †Trematopidae
- Genus: †Ecolsonia; Vaughn, 1969

= Ecolsonia =

Extinct genus of amphibians

Ecolsonia is an extinct genus of trematopid temnospondyl. Its phylogenetic position within Olsoniformes has been historically debated, but it is presently considered to be a trematopid.

== History of study ==
The holotype of Ecolsonia is a partial skull that was collected in 1963 from the VanderHoof quarry in the Early Permian Cutler Formation of New Mexico. The specimen was originally reposited at the now defunct University of California, Los Angeles Vertebrate Paleontology collections. The genus name is for the American paleontologist Everett C. Olson, and the species name is for the geologic provenance. A number of more complete specimens from the Morfin quarry in the Cutler Formation were discovered in 1983 and described by Berman et al. (1985), including a complete skull and large amounts of postcranial material. These specimens are currently reposited at the Carnegie Museum of Natural History.

== Anatomy ==
Schoch & Milner (2014) listed seven features in the diagnosis of Ecolsonia: (1) tabular and squamosal frame otic fenestra; (2) prefrontal and postfrontal separated (shared with most other trematopids); (3) preorbital region of equal length to posterior skull table; (4) vomer with a posteromedial process meeting the pterygoid (shared with other trematopids); (5) a supratemporal that is twice as long as it is wide; (6) triangular patch of denticles on the parasphenoid (shared with other trematopids); and (7) basipterygoid region unsutured (shared with some other trematopids). Trematopid synapomorphies include the posterior process of the vomer, the denticles on the parasphenoid, and the supinator process of the humerus. A large number of small scales were also found with some specimens of Ecolsonia that probably covered the entire body, a feature similar to that seen in the trematopid Anconastes; these are distinct from the osteoderms of dissorophids that are only associated with the vertebral column.

== Relationships ==
Ecolsonia was originally classified as a trematopid by Vaughn (1969). At this time, only one other currently recognized trematopid was known (Acheloma and its junior synonym Trematops), in comparison to 13 known dissorophids, but Vaughn noted that the proportions of the skull, the sutural patterns, and the elongate naris were all features similar to those of Acheloma. Berman et al. (1985) classified Ecolsonia as a dissorophid in part because features considered to be diagnostic of trematopids were also found in other taxa interpreted as dissorophids, Actiobates peabodyi (now a trematopid) and Longiscitula houghae (now a junior synonym of the dissorophid Dissorophus multicinctus). In general, these authors considered many of the features that now link Ecolsonia to trematopids to be convergences acquired independently in dissorophids, a hypothesis that is no longer widely accepted or supported by phylogenetic analyses.
