= Mordex =

Mordex Temporal range: Late Carboniferous, 311.45–306.95 Ma

Scientific classification
- Kingdom: Animalia
- Phylum: Chordata
- Clade: Tetrapoda
- Order: †Temnospondyli
- Family: †Trematopidae
- Genus: †Mordex; M.C. Steen, 1938

Type species
- Mordex calliprepes Steen, 1938

Extinct genus of amphibians

Mordex is an extinct genus of temnospondyls from Carboniferous of the Czech Republic.

== See also ==
- Prehistoric amphibian
- List of prehistoric amphibians
