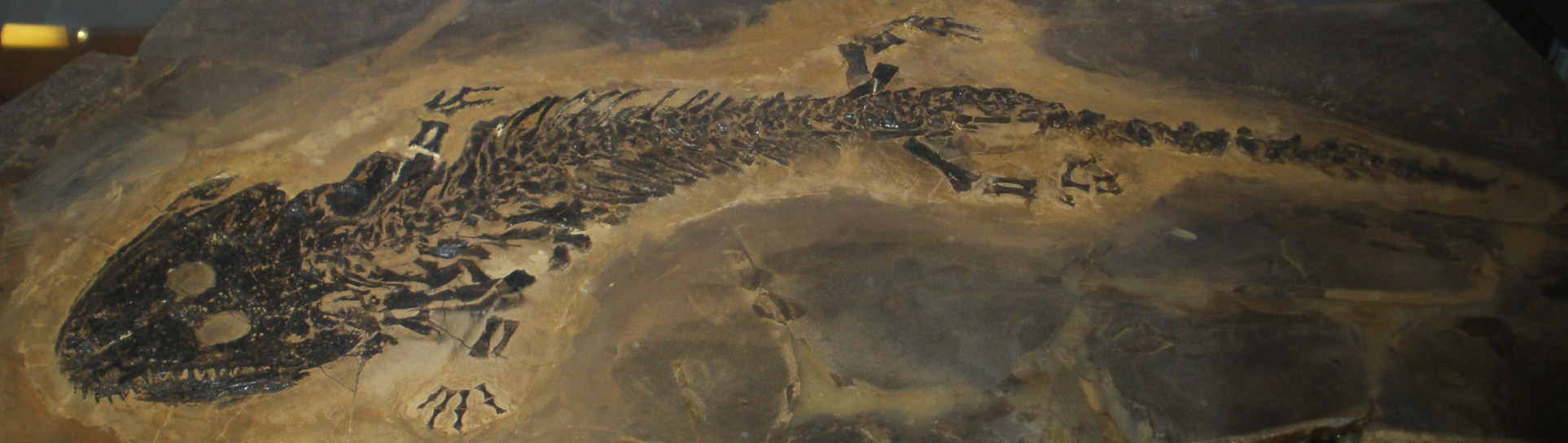
- Fossil of Micromelerpeton credneri in the Museum of Man and Nature, Munich

Scientific classification
- Kingdom: Animalia
- Phylum: Chordata
- Clade: Tetrapoda
- Order: †Temnospondyli
- Superfamily: †Dissorophoidea
- Family: †Micromelerpetontidae; Boy, 1972

Genera
- Branchierpeton; Eimerisaurus; Limnogyrinus; Micromelerpeton; Nyranerpeton

= Micromelerpetontidae =

Extinct family of temnospondyls

Micromelerpetontidae (also spelled Micromelerpetidae) is an extinct family of dissorophoid temnospondyls that lived from the Late Carboniferous to the Early Permian in what is now Europe, with one Carboniferous species also known from North Africa. They were biologically similar to the related branchiosaurids, but proportionally akin to the unrelated microsaurs.

Micromelerpetontids were neotenic and aquatic, similar to their relatives the branchiosaurids. They had lateral line grooves, poorly ossified skulls and limbs, and evidence of external gills. However, they had a higher number of vertebrae (and therefore more elongated bodies) compared to branchiosaurids, as well as thick, bony scales covering the belly and limbs. Some members of the family had skulls which were longer behind the eyes (rather than in front of them), while the opposite was true of branchiosaurids.
