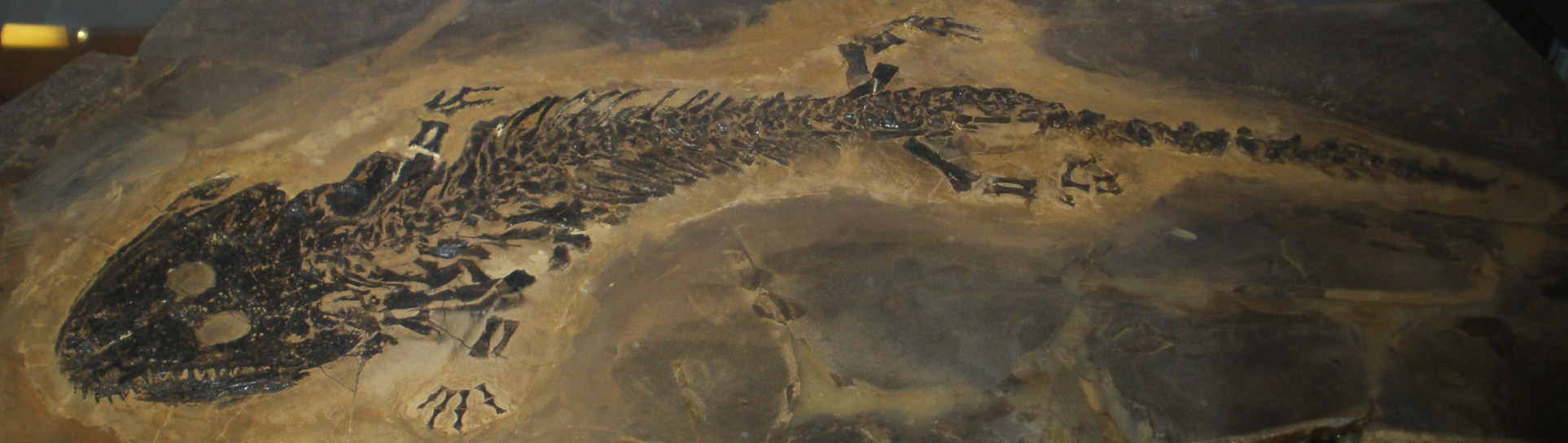

Scientific classification
- Kingdom: Animalia
- Phylum: Chordata
- Clade: Tetrapoda
- Order: †Temnospondyli
- Family: †Micromelerpetontidae
- Genus: †Micromelerpeton; Bulman & Whittard, 1926

= Micromelerpeton =

Micromelerpeton Temporal range: Carboniferous–Permian, 298.9–295.0 Ma

Extinct genus of temnospondyls

Micromelerpeton is an extinct genus of dissorophoidean temnospondyl within the family Micromelerpetontidae.
