= Actiobates =

Actiobates Temporal range: Carboniferous, 305.9–303.4 Ma

Scientific classification
- Kingdom: Animalia
- Phylum: Chordata
- Clade: Tetrapoda
- Order: †Temnospondyli
- Family: †Trematopidae
- Genus: †Actiobates; Eaton, 1973

Type species
- Actiobates peabodyi Eaton, 1973

Extinct genus of amphibians

Actiobates is an extinct genus of trematopid temnospondyl that lived during the Late Carboniferous. It is known from the Garnett Quarry in Kansas.

== History of study ==
Actiobates peabodyi was named in 1973 by Theodore Eaton. The genus name derives from the Greek words actios ("shore") and bates ("walker"), referring to the estuarine nature of the Garnett Quarry deposits, and the specific name is for the American paleontologist Frank Peabody. The taxon is based on a single specimen represented by a partial skull and associated postcranial skeleton that is currently deposited at the University of Kansas Natural History Museum.

== Anatomy ==
The holotype of A. peabodyi is dorsoventrally compressed, obscuring many details of the anatomy. Schoch & Milner (2014) listed only one diagnostic feature for the taxon, a quadratojugal excluded from the smooth ventral border of the otic notch.

== Relationships ==
Eaton (1973) originally classified Actiobates as a dissorophid but only because he considered the differences between dissorophids and trematopids to be insufficient to warrant their differentiation. Subsequent phylogenetic analyses have generally refrained from including Actiobates in their analysis because of its interpretation as a putative larval individual, but it is widely accepted to be a trematopid in recent studies.

== See also ==
- Prehistoric amphibian
- List of prehistoric amphibians
