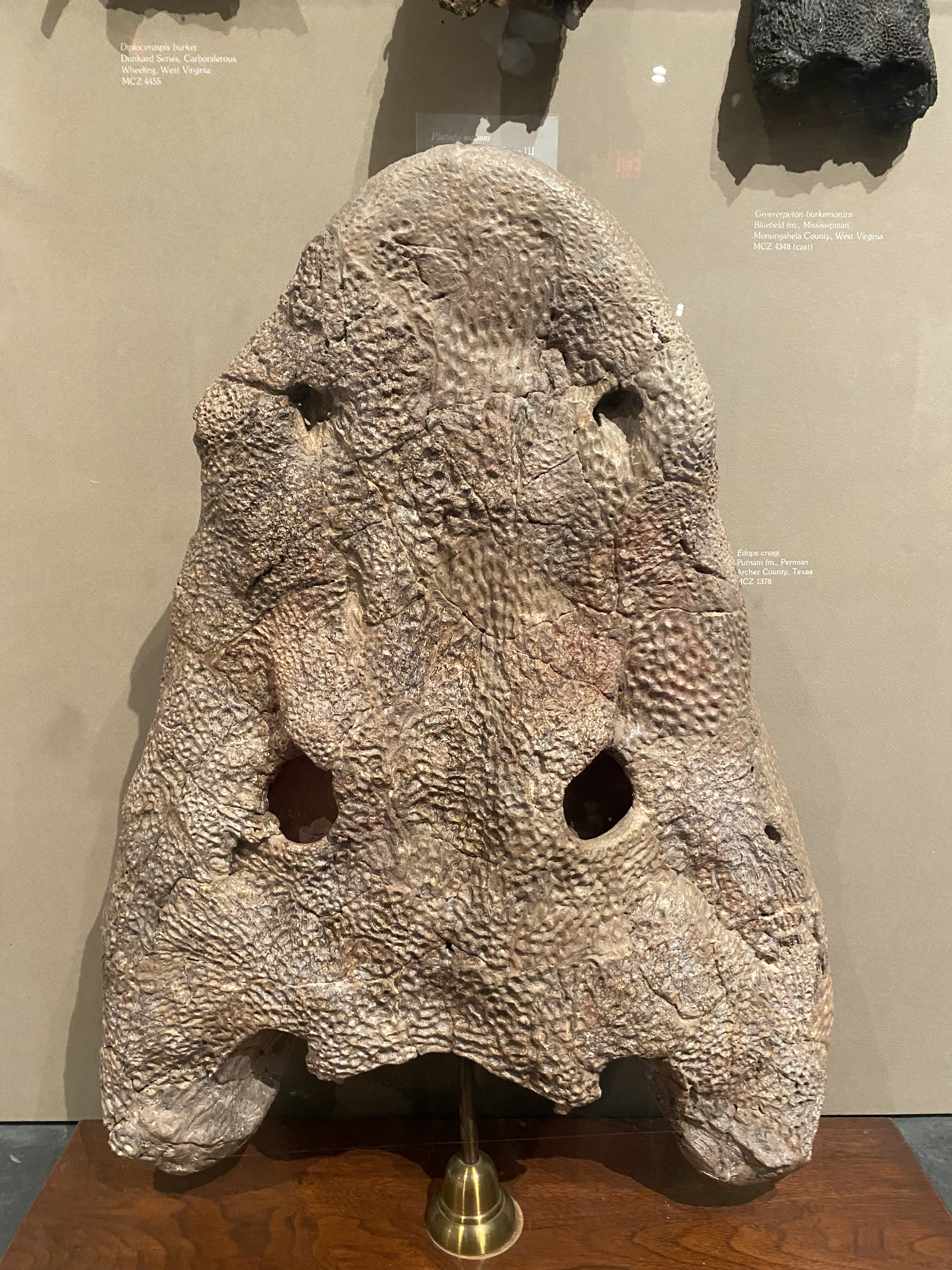
- Skull of Edops craigi on display at Harvard

Scientific classification
- Kingdom: Animalia
- Phylum: Chordata
- Clade: Tetrapoda
- Order: †Temnospondyli
- Superfamily: †Edopoidea
- Family: †Edopidae; Langston, 1953
- Genus: †Edops; Romer and Witter, 1936

Type species
- †Edops craigi Romer and Witter, 1936

= Edops =

Edops Temporal range: Late Carboniferous - Early Permian 303.4–280 Ma

Extinct genus of amphibians

Edops ('swollen face') is an extinct genus of temnospondyl amphibian from the Late Carboniferous - Early Permian periods. Unlike more advanced temnospondyls of the time, such as Eryops, Edops exhibited an archaic pattern of palatal bones, and still possessed various additional bones at the back of the skull. Edopoids also had particularly big premaxillae (the bones that form the tip of the snout) and proportionally small external nostrils. Within the clade, the most basal member seems to be Edops from the Early Permian Archer City Formation of the US, a broad-skulled animal with large palatal teeth.

Edops was big, at 3 metres (9.8 ft) in length. Its skull at 63 cm was notably larger than of Eryops, which itself had a 50 cm skull. Fragmentary remains from the Viséan of Scotland appear to come from Edops or a close relative and hence predate the type Edops material of the Permian.

== Discovery and naming ==
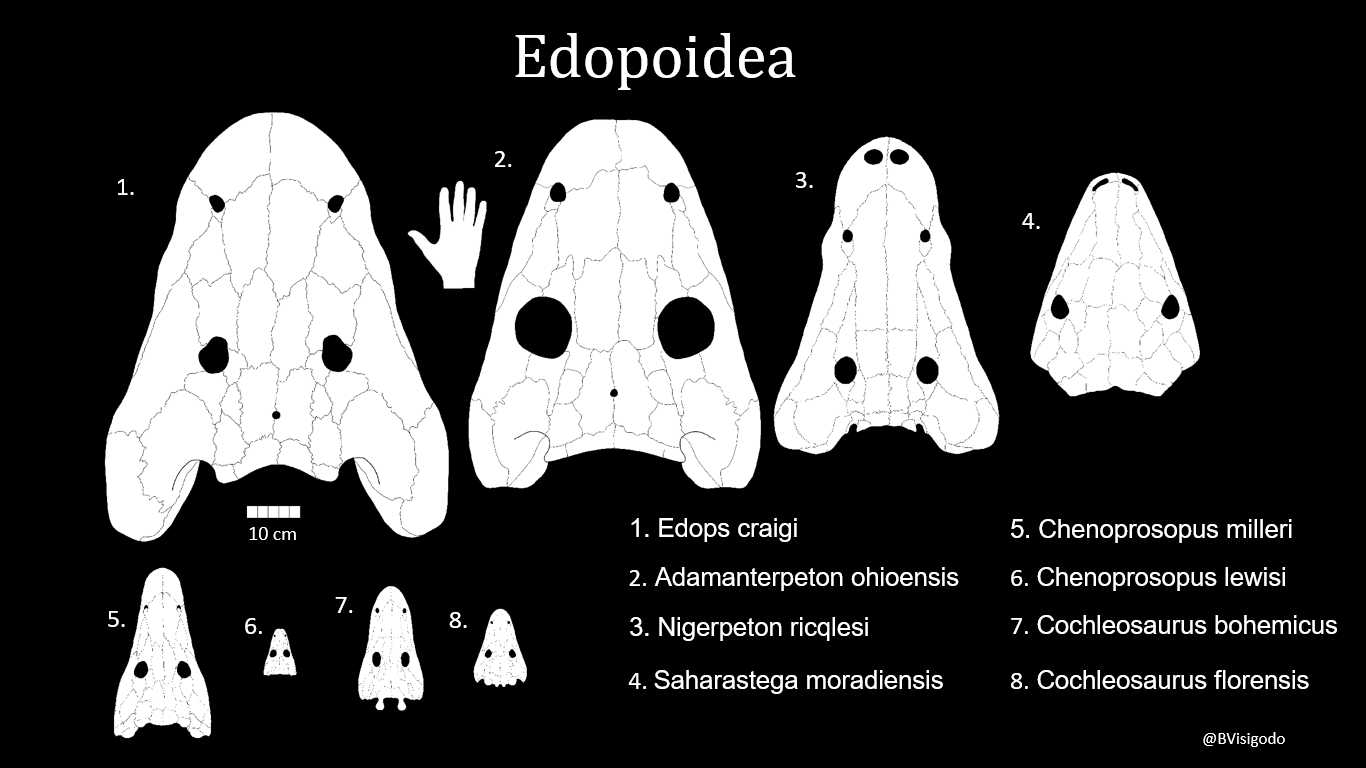
Skulls of Edops (1) and other edopoids

The American paleontologist Alfred Sherwood Romer named Edops "swollen face" (from Greek oidos "swelling" and Greek ops "face") in 1936, noting that the "premaxillaries are greatly thickened and produced externally into rounded swellings (whence the generic name)." (The Latinized spelling "edo" for "oidos" resembles the Latin word edo meaning a glutton, but this is not the formal etymology.) In a 1943 popular article, Romer explained that the original fossil find was nicknamed "Grandpa Bumps" for the lumps of bone, which had survived while the rest of the first skull had been largely destroyed. Romer and his preparator R. V. Witter from Harvard University described Edops in more detail from additional fossil material in 1942.

== Phylogeny ==
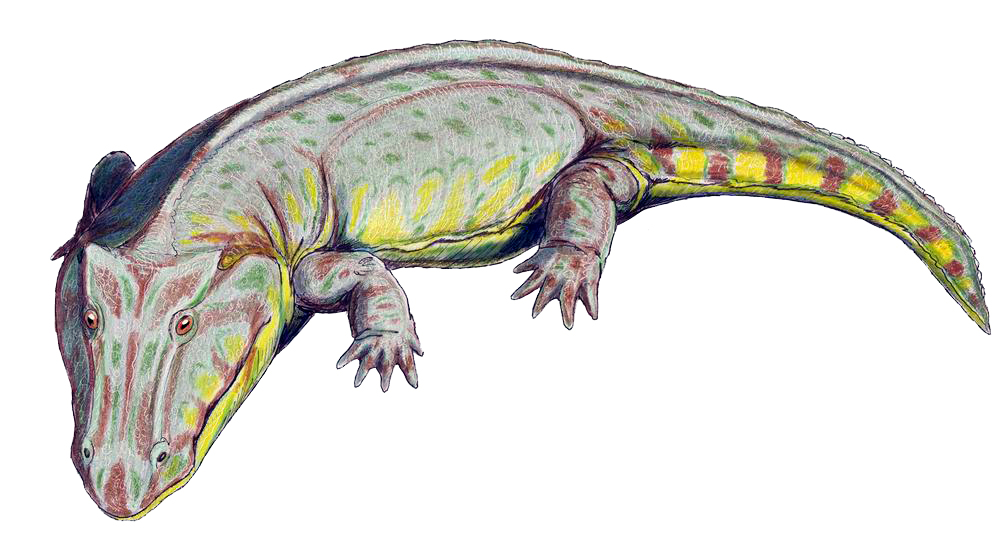
Life restoration

Edops craigi in a cladogram after Steyer et al.., 2006:

- Edopoidea
  - Edops craigi
  - Cochleosauridae
    - Procochleosaurus jarrowensis
    - - Adamanterpeton ohioensis
      - Cochleosaurinae
        - - Cochleosaurus bohemicus
          - Cochleosaurus florensis
        - - Nigerpeton ricqlesi
          - - Chenoprosopus milleri
            - Chenoprosopus lewisi
