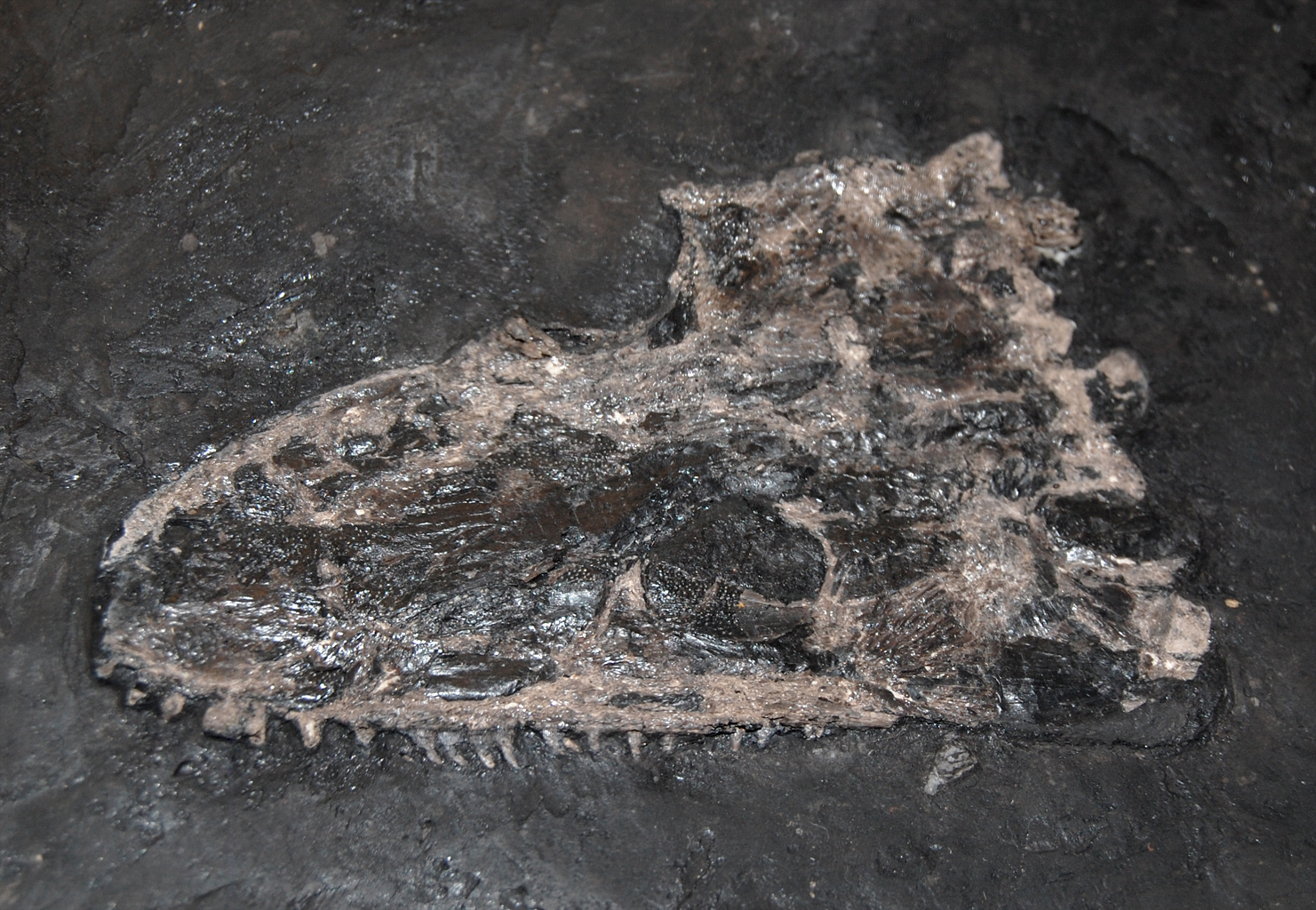
- Skull in Vienna

Scientific classification
- Kingdom: Animalia
- Phylum: Chordata
- Clade: Tetrapoda
- Order: †Temnospondyli
- Family: †Cochleosauridae
- Subfamily: †Cochleosaurinae
- Genus: †Cochleosaurus; Fritsch 1885

Species
- †C. bohemicus Fritsch 1885 (type); †C. florensis Rieppel 1980

Synonyms
- Gaudrya Fritsch 1885; Nyrania Fritsch 1885

= Cochleosaurus =

Cochleosaurus Temporal range: Moscovian ~310 Ma

Extinct genus of temnospondyls

Cochleosaurus (“spoon lizard”, from the Latin cochlear "spoon" and Greek sauros “lizard”) were medium-sized edopoid temnospondyls that lived in Euramerica during the Moscovian age. Two species, C. bohemicus and C. florensis, have been identified from the fossil record.

Both species lived in equatorial saltwater marshes with highly variable water depth. The majority of Cochleosaurus remains have been discovered in fossil assemblages in the Late Carboniferous Sydney Coalfield in Nova Scotia and the Kladno Formation in the Czech Republic.

== History ==
The first Cochleosaurus specimen to be discovered was excavated by Antonín Jan Frič in the Westphalian D fossil deposits in Nýřany, Czech Republic, in 1879. Due to the incomplete skeleton, he believed it to be a new species of Melosaurus, which he named Melosaurus bohemicus. After more detailed analysis in 1885, Frič realized the specimens belonged to a new genus, and renamed the species Cochleosaurus bohemicus; the “spoon” references the curved processes in the supraorbital bones, while bohemicus commemorates the region in which the fossil was found. The first specimens described were later discovered to be juveniles, with adult specimens of C. bohemicus first being analyzed by S. Sequera in 2003.

Cochleosaurus florensis was first discovered in the Lloyd Cive seam of the Morian Formation Nova Scotia in 1956. The two skulls remained unidentified until 1980, when Oliver Rieppel identified these specimens as a new cochleosaurid species, distinct from C. bohemicus, on the basis of their distinct skull morphology. He named this species C. florensis in honor Florence, Cape Breton, Nova Scotia, the town nearest the site where the specimens were discovered.

== Description ==
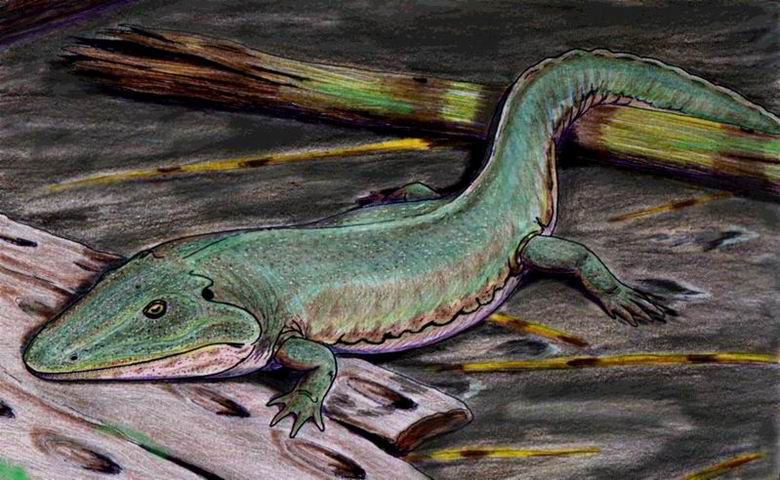
Life restoration

Like other temnospondyls, Cochleosaurus had internal gills, and their rib structure was not suitable for costal aspiration. This is because the ribs were straight, short proportional to body size, and covered with periosteal bone at the distal tips, which indicate the ribs were not attached to the ventral sternum. Furthermore, the rib shaft was flat in cross section, which would preclude having sufficient intercostal musculature to support costal movements. Finally, the ribs were not mobile, due to the morphology of the rib heads at the costa-vertebral joint.

Cochleosaurus was originally believed to lack lateral line canals. However, further analysis has discovered that both C. bohemicus and C. florensis, like other cochleosaurids, had lateral lines, but with the sensory canals enclosed in bone, making them invisible from the outside. Juvenile C. bohemicus had a pineal opening, but this is closed in adult specimens. It is unknown if C. Florensis had a pineal opening as a juvenile.

Based on fossil evidence from related Temnospondyl taxa, it is believed Cochleosaurus species were likely covered in small, densely packed scales, with larger scales or ventral plates on their underbellies. However, this is not confirmed, as fossil evidence of Cochleosaurus soft tissues has not been discovered.

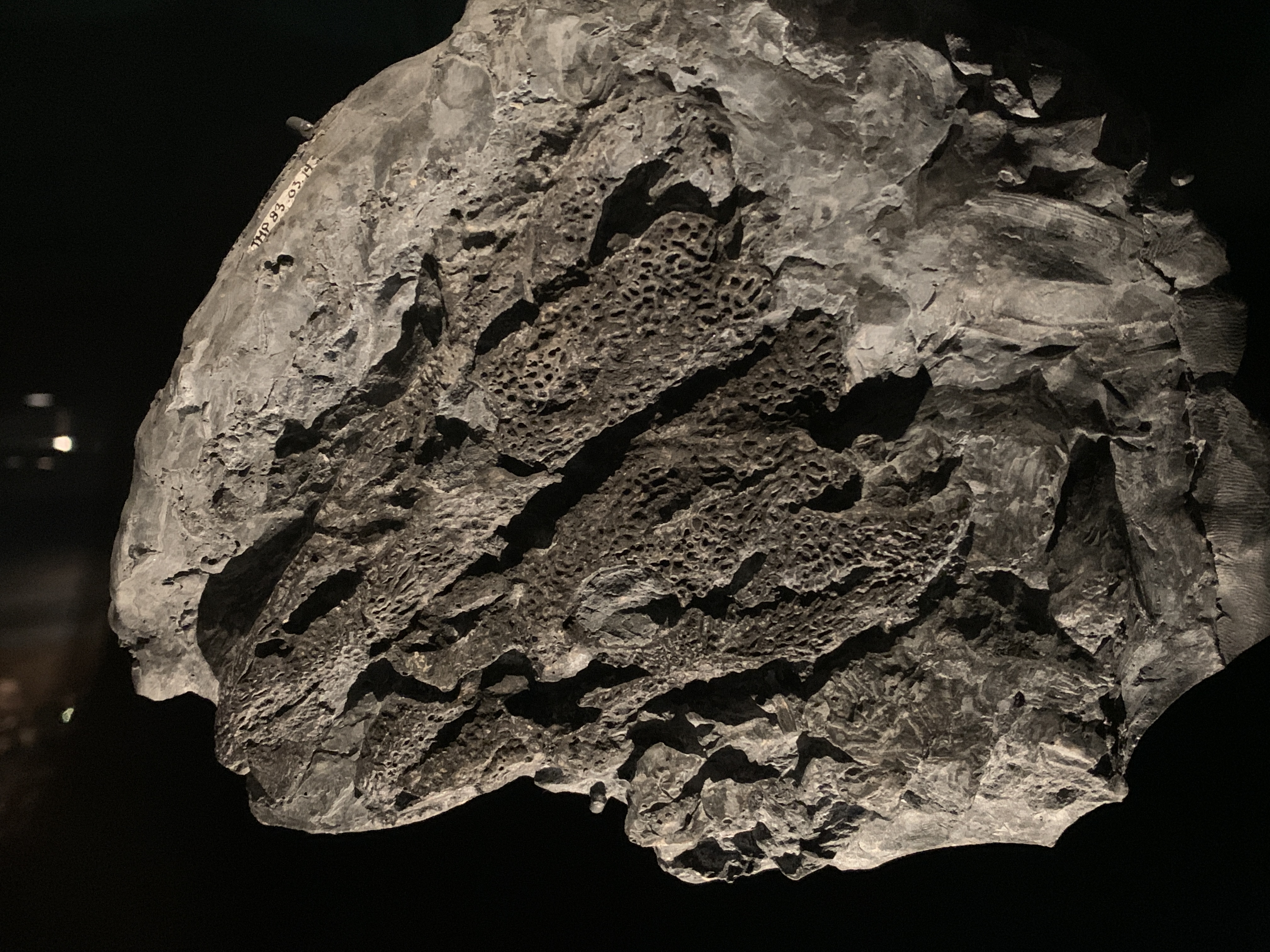
Skull at the Royal Tyrell Museum

Like other Temnospondyls, both Cochleosaurus species had a narrow, rounded snout and eyes positioned at the top of the skull. There is a single Meckelian fenestra in the adult specimens of C. bohemicus. The adult skulls of C. bohemicus and C. florensis have similar ratios of index skull lengths to the width of the skull table and the width between orbital bones. C. florensis, however, had a much larger orbital width in relationship to its skull length, and a shorter snout compared to the length of the entire skull. C. bohemicus had larger post parietal lapets, which indicates an allometric growth pattern during skeletal development. The jaws of both species consist of ten bones, and both the upper and lower jaw have a large number of marginal teeth as well as a pair of palatal fangs situatied on each vomer, palatine, and ectopterygoid. The teeth were covered with a thin level of enamel over a thicker layer of infolded dentine, with dental pulp in the center. The palate was densely covered with dentacles, which extended back along the palate past the jaw joint.

In C. bohemicus, many specimens were found to have asymmetry in the common nasal-frontal structures. In some specimens, the nasals extend between the frontals and prefrontals. Muscle attachments for the retractor bulb are thought to have been on the ventral surface of the circumorbital bones, where there is a depression on both sides of the skull, anterolateral relative to the denticle field.

The dermal skull has prominent sculpturing in both species, but sculpturing patterns are specific to each species. Small pits found in the postorbital skull of C. florensis may be evidence of tear glands in that species. In C. bohemicus, there is evidence of a lacrimal duct which drains into the naris by following the finely pitted septomaxillary flange.

Muscles likely attached on the ventral surface of the circumorbital bones. Cochleosaurus bohemicus had sharp crests on the ventral surface of both the left and right prefrontal circumorbital bones, parallel to the anteromedial margin of the orbit. These rugosities circle posteriorly on the anterior part of the postfrontal, and appear to be sites for muscle attachment.

== Classification ==
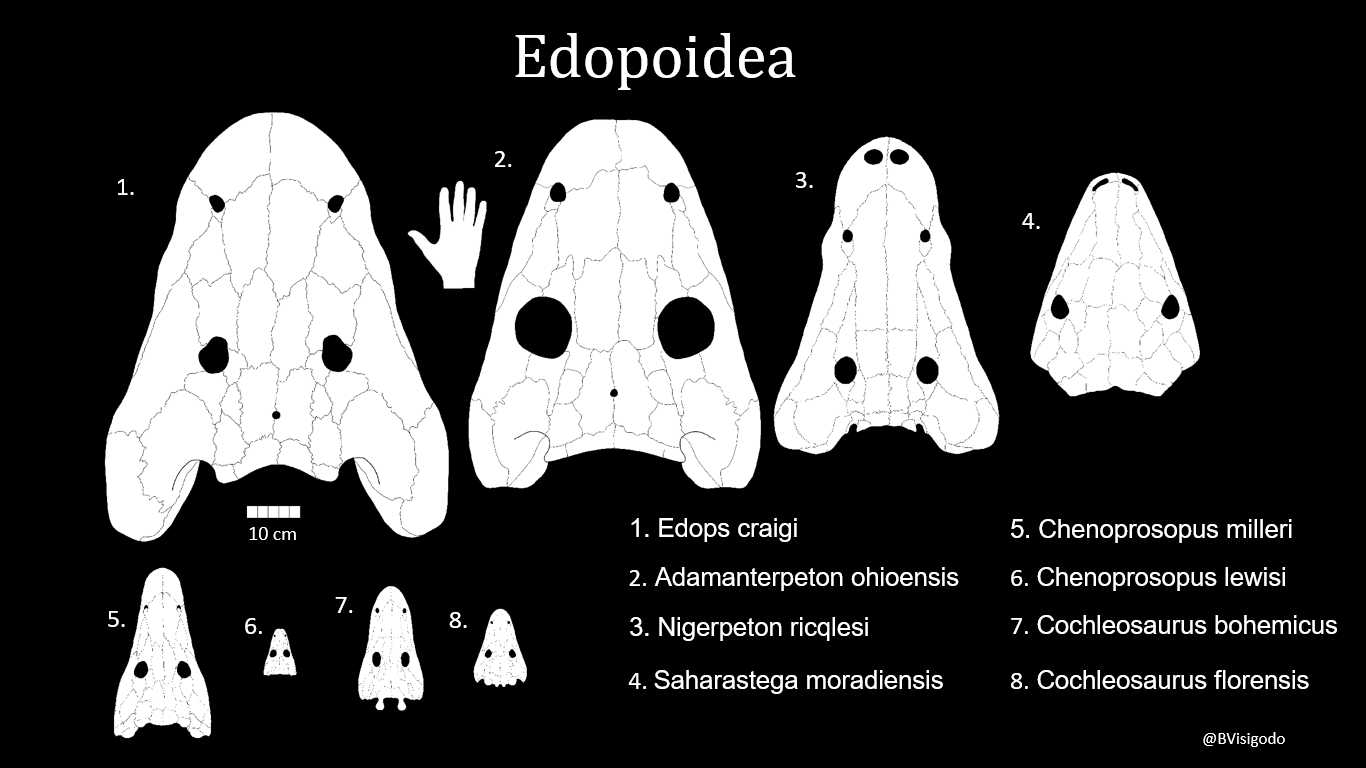
Diagram showing skulls of Edopoidea, 7 and 8 are Cochleosaurus

Analysis of specimen synapomorphies in adult and juvenile C. bohemicus by Sequiera (2003) places Cochleosaurus as a sister taxa to Chenoprosopus. These species are thought to fall into the larger clade Cochleosauridae, along with Adamanterpeton, including the terrestrial species A. ohioensis. This is supported by the work of Fröbisch et al. (2010) on the ontogenetic sequences of temnospondyls.

- Temnospondyli
  - Balanerpeton woodi
  - Capetus palustris
  - - Saharastega moradiensis
    - - Edopoidea
        - Edops craigi
        - Cochleosauridae
          - Procochleosaurus jarrowensis
          - - Adamanterpeton ohioensis
            - Cochleosaurinae
              - - Cochleosaurus bohemicus
                - Cochleosaurus florensis
              - - Nigerpeton ricqlesi
                - - Chenoprosopus milleri
                  - Chenoprosopus lewisi
      - Eryops megacephalus and other temnospondyls

== Paleoecology ==
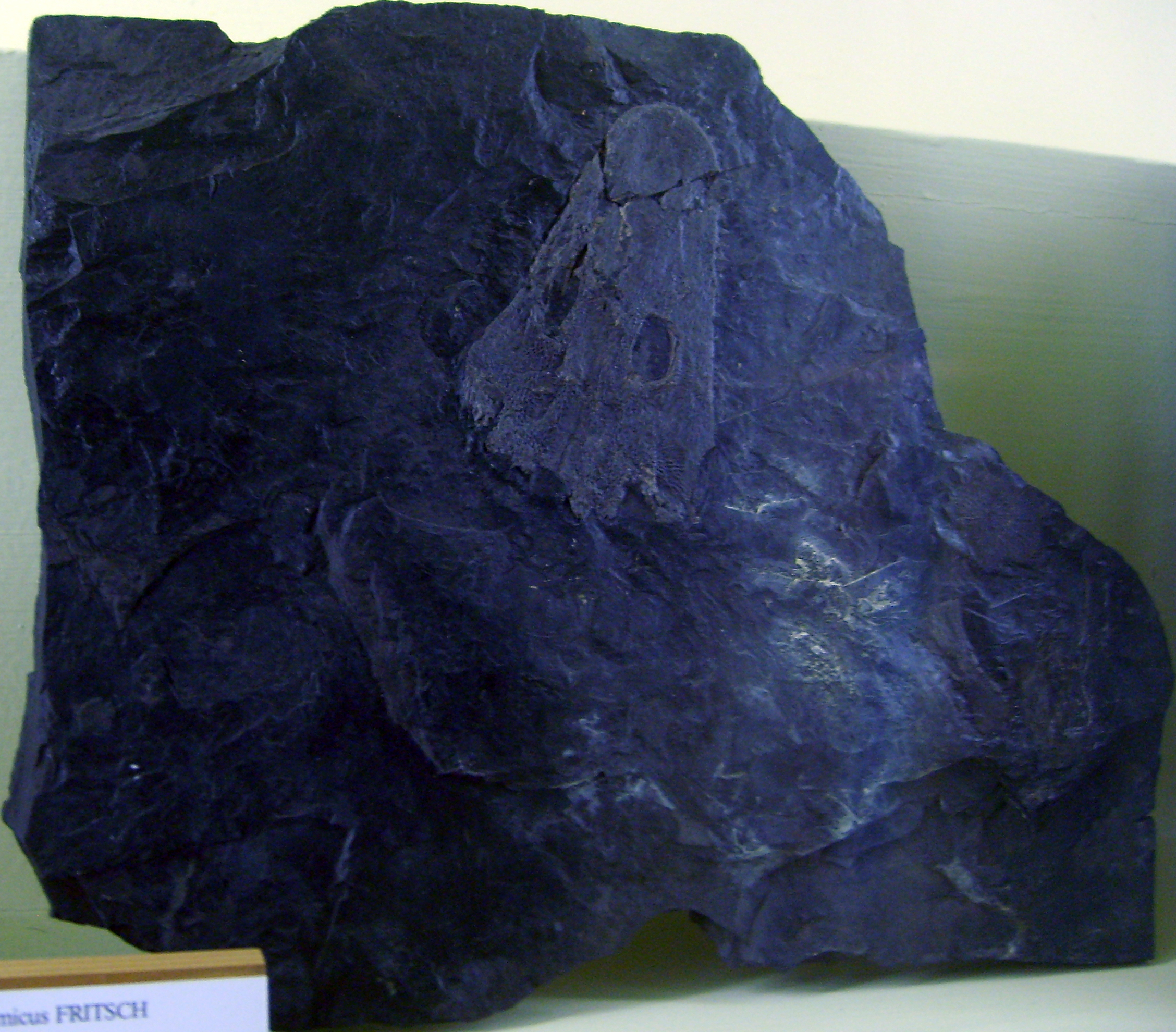
C. bohemicus skull at the Museum für Naturkunde, Berlin

Edopoid temnospondyls are believed to have originated in Euramerica, which was centered on the equatorial region of Pangea, which provided a refugian for temnospondyls especially later in the Carboniferous period, as global temperatures dropped. Cochleosaurus fossils have been found in Late Carboniferous fossil assemblages characteristic of seasonal wetlands. Analysis of sediment from the Sydney Coal Field, where the C. florensis specimen was first discovered, found that the habitat had little to no fresh water and that the level of inundation was highly variable.

A majority of C. bohemicus specimens have been found in the Kladno Formation in the Czech Republic. During the Moscovian period, this region was submerged by a freshwater lake covering between 5,000-10,000 km^{2}, and located in the equatorial region of eastern Pangea. The fossil assemblage in the Klando Formation shows that this was a diverse freshwater habitat which supported a large number of fish species and aquatic plants. Like the salt marshes inhabited by C. Florensis, the sediment deposits from this region show that the lake was subject to dramatic changes in water level, partly influenced by seasonal cycles characteristic of Pangea during the Moscovian period.

Although Cochleosaurus species, like other temnospondyls, were amphibious, comparison of the patterns of interosseous blood vessels found in Cochleosaurus fossils with those of other early tetrapods has led some researchers to conclude that both C. bohemicus and C. florensis were more adapted to terrestrial habitats than other temnospondyls. C. Florensis was discovered in a fossil assemblage which also includes terrestrial reptiles, giving some support to the idea that this species was able to move into more terrestrial habitats. However, due to their internal gills, Cochleosaurus would require a habitat with access to water in order to keep their gills moist for gas exchange.
