= Allegheny Group =

Pennsylvanian-age geological unit

- Stratigraphic range: (Moscovian); ~311–306.8 Ma
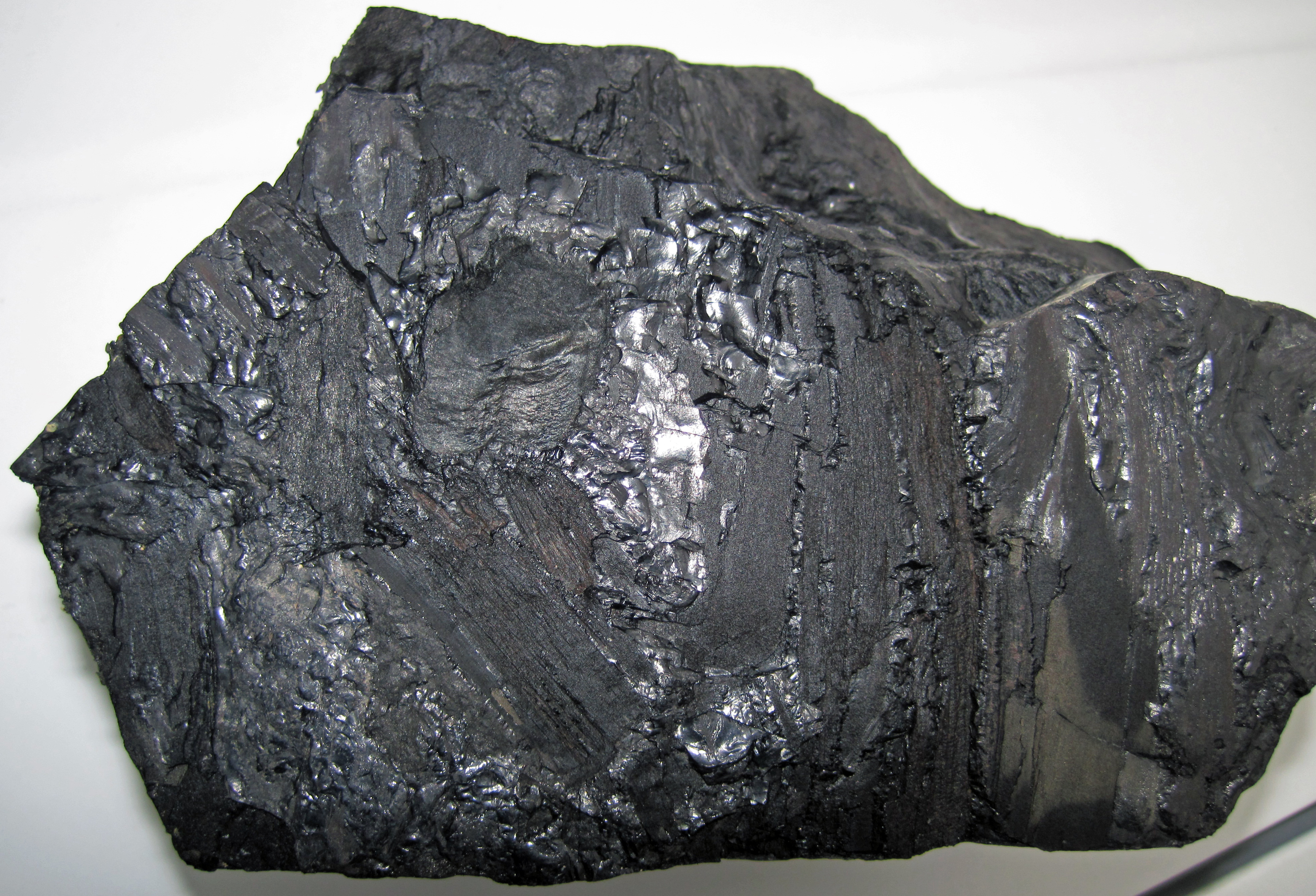
- Bituminous coal (Clarion Coal) from the Allegheny Group, Ohio
- Type: Sedimentary
- Sub-units: Freeport Formation Upper Freeport Coal Upper Freeport Limestone Member Butler Sandstone Member Lower Freeport Coal Freeport Sandstone Member Kittanning Formation Upper Kittanning Coal Johnstone Limestone Member Middle Kittanning Coal Lower Kittanning Coal Kittanning Sandstone Member Vanport Limestone Member
- Underlies: Conemaugh Group
- Overlies: Kanawha Formation and Pottsville Formation

Lithology
- Primary: Sandstone, coal

Location
- Region: Appalachian Mountains
- Country: United States
- Extent: Pennsylvania, Maryland, West Virginia, Ohio

Type section
- Named by: H. D. Rogers, 1840

The Allegheny Group, often termed the Allegheny Formation, is a Pennsylvanian-age geological unit in the Appalachian Plateau. It is a major coal-bearing unit in the eastern United States, extending through western and central Pennsylvania, western Maryland and West Virginia, and southeastern Ohio. Fossils of fishes such as Bandringa are known from the Kittaning Formation, which is part of the Allegheny Group.

== Stratigraphy ==
In Pennsylvania, the Allegheny Group includes rocks from the base of the Brooksville Coal to the top of the Upper Freeport Coal, and was defined to include all economically significant coals in the upper Pennsylvanian sequence. The unit consists of cyclothemic sequences of coal, shale, limestone, sandstone, and clay. It contains six major coal zones, which, in stratigraphic order, are:

- Upper Freeport Coal
- Lower Freeport Coal
- Upper Kittanning Coal
- Middle Kittanning Coal
- Lower Kittanning Coal
- Brookville Coal

=== Members ===
Glen Richey (PA), Laurel Run (PA), Mineral Springs (PA), Millstone Run (PA), Clearfield Creek (PA); Clarion (OH, MD, PA, WV), Kittanning (PA), Freeport (PA, MD, OH, WV); Putnam Hill (OH, PA); Vanport (PA, MD, OH, WV); Butler (MD, PA), Worthington (MD, PA); Washingtonville (OH, PA, WV), Columbiana (OH)

=== Age ===
Relative age dating of the Allegheny places it about mid-way through the Pennsylvanian, the second subperiod of the Carboniferous period. The plant and conchostracan fossils in particular can be equated with European strata of the "Asturian" (Westphalian D) regional stage. In North America, the roughly equivalent regional stage is known as the Desmoinesian. The Asturian has an estimated age of 310.7 to 307.5 million years ago (Ma), equivalent to the latter half of the global Moscovian stage.

== Notable sites ==
The Allegheny Group has the richest fauna of tetrapod fossils in the entire Appalachian Basin, and practically all of these fossils are concentrated at the Linton site of Ohio.

=== Linton ===
Linton was once a tiny village at the mouth of Yellow Creek (Saline Township) in Jefferson County. The nearby Diamond Coal Mine was active from 1855 to 1892, and again from 1917 to 1921, when the drift mine was permanently closed. The drift mine collapsed soon afterwards and the settlement diminished into obscurity. The main Diamond coal seam is likely equivalent to the Upper Freeport coal.

John S. Newberry, from Columbia University and Chief Geologist of the Geological Survey of Ohio, was the first paleontologist to investigate the Linton area. Starting in 1856, he collected thousands of fossils from the mine. Under the stewardship of E.D. Cope, some of Newberry's fossils were transferred to the American Museum of Natural History (AMNH), and others to the Orton Geological Museum at The Ohio State University.

Other 19th-century geologists who collected fossils from the site include Frank Howe Bradley (1865, on behalf of Yale), R. N. Fearon (1883, Harvard), and Thomas Stock (1888, British Museum and the National Museum of Natural History). Fossil collection extended into the 20th century, with expeditions led by Jesse Hyde (AMNH), A.S. Romer (Field Museum), Donald Baird (Harvard, Princeton), Richard Lund and David Hamilla (Carnegie). Over 7000 Linton fossils are now in the collections of at least 14 museums across three countries.

=== Five Points ===
Another fossil-rich site in the Allegheny Group is Five Points, a similar coal deposit in Beaver Township of Mahoning County. The Five Points cannel coal mine was first publicized as a fossil site by Robert Hook and Donald Baird in 1994, who collected tetrapod fossils comparable to those found at Linton. However, the mine at Five Points was reclaimed around the same time, so the fossiliferous spoil piles are no longer accessible for further collection.

== Paleobiota ==
Tetrapod records from Hook & Baird (1986/1988) unless cited otherwise:

=== Amniotes ===
Amniotes of the Allegheny Group
Species	Locality	Notes	Images
Anthracodromeus longipes	Linton	A "protorothyridid" eureptile	
Archaeothyris sp.	Linton	A possible ophiacodontid synapsid based on rare fragments	
Carbonodraco lundi	Linton	An acleistorhinid parareptile based on fossils previously referred to Cephalerpeton	
Melanedaphodon hovaneci	Linton	A edaphosaurid synapsid	

=== Temnospondyls ===
Temnospondyls of the Allegheny Group
Species	Locality	Notes	Images
Adamanterpeton ohioensis	Linton	A rare cochleosaurid edopoid, previously referred to "Gaudrya cf. latistoma"	
Erpetosaurus radiatus	Linton	A common eobrachyopid dvinosaur	
Isodectes obtusus	Linton, Five Points	An abundant eobrachyopid dvinosaur, previously known as Saurerpeton obtusum	
Macrerpeton huxleyi	Linton	A rare temnospondyl, possibly an edopoid or dissorophoid	
Palodromeus bairdi	Five Points	The earliest-braching olsoniform dissorophoid, known from a single skull	
Platyrhinops lyelli	Linton	A common amphibamiform dissorophoid, previously considered a species of Amphibamus	
Stegops newberryi	Linton	A rare spiny dissorophoid	

=== Lepospondyls ===
Lepospondyls of the Allegheny Group
Species	Locality	Notes	Images
Brachydectes newberryi	Linton	A lysorophian, likely encompassing fossils previously referred to Pleuroptyx clavatus (which are rare) and Cocytinus gyrinoides (which are common)	
Ctenerpeton remex	Linton	A rare urocordylid nectridean	
Diceratosaurus brevirostris	Linton	An abundant diplocaulid nectridean	
Molgophis macrurus	Linton	A rare lysorophian	
Oestocephalus amphiuminus	Linton, Five Points	An abundant aistopod, previously considered a species of Ophiderpeton.	
Odonterpeton triangulare	Linton	A rare small-limbed microsaur known from a single partial skeleton	
Phlegethontia linearis	Linton	A common aistopod	
Ptyonius marshii	Linton	An abundant urocordylid nectridean	
Sauropleura pectinata	Linton	An abundant urocordylid nectridean	
Tuditanus punctulatus	Linton	A rare tuditanid microsaur	

=== Other amphibians ===
Various indeterminate embolomere fossils are known from the fossil sites of the Allegheny Group, including an articulated tail from Five Points, an eogyrinid-like skull roof from Linton, and archeriid-like cranial and postcranial fragments from both Linton and Five Points.

Other tetrapods of the Allegheny Group
Species	Locality	Notes	Images
Baphetes lineolatus	Linton	A rare baphetid	
Colosteus scutellatus	Linton	An abundant colosteid	
Eusauropleura digitata	Linton	A rare gephyrostegid	
Leptophractus obsoletus	Linton	A rare embolomere, likely encompassing fossils previously given the name "Anthracosaurus lancifer"	
Megalocephalus lineolatus	Linton	A rare baphetid, also known as Megalocephalus enchodus	

=== Invertebrates ===
Marine fossils in the Allegheny Group are concentrated into only a few patchy bands of limestone and shale. Four marine members (Putnam Hill, Vanport, Columbiana, and Washingtonville) have produced a rich fauna of cephalopod fossils, the best representation of the Desmoinesian stage in the Appalachian region.

In terrestrial sediments, the Allegheny Group preserves characteristic Desmoinesian index fossils of conchostracans (bivalved crustaceans). Conchostracan species in the unit belong to an assemblage zone distinguished by Anomalonema reumauxi, Pseudestheria simoni, and potentially Palaeolimnadiopsis freysteini. Invertebrate fossils from Linton include 'spirorbid' tubes, ostracods, syncarid crustaceans, and millipedes (Xyloiulus bairdi, Plagiascetus lateralis, and other undescribed species). Some groups (insects, arachnids, and freshwater bivalves) are curiously absent from Linton.

=== Plants ===
The lowermost portion of the Allegheny Group belongs to the Laveineopteris rarinervis plant macrofossil zone. This biozone is distinguished by Laveineopteris rarinervis and Neuropteris ovata, two species of medullosalean "seed ferns" which first appear in the uppermost Kanawha Formation. In the Kittanning coals and higher stratigraphic sections, the plant fossils transition to the Neuropteris flexuosa zone, characterized by Neuropteris flexuosa and the marrattialean fern Cyathocarpus. The plant macrofossil record is mirrored by microfossils: "tree fern" spores are the most diverse components of the palynoflora, and Lycospora (a lycopsid miospore) is also abundant.
