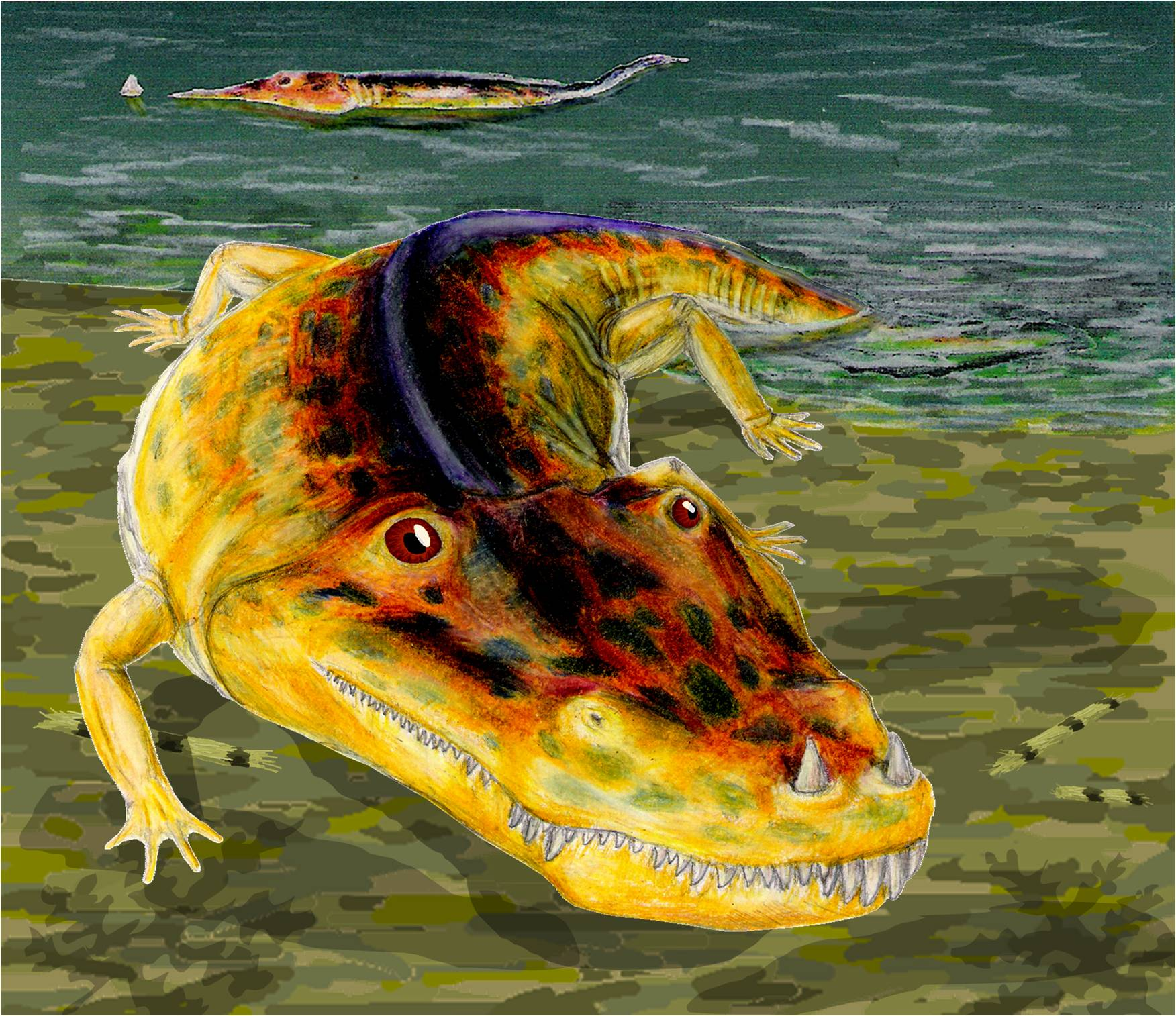
- Nigerpeton

Scientific classification
- Kingdom: Animalia
- Phylum: Chordata
- Clade: Tetrapoda
- Order: †Temnospondyli
- Family: †Cochleosauridae
- Subfamily: †Cochleosaurinae
- Genus: †Nigerpeton; Sidor et al., 2005

Species
- Nigerpeton ricqlesi

= Nigerpeton =

Nigerpeton Temporal range: Changhsingian

Extinct genus of amphibians

Nigerpeton (Niger, for the country, and herpeton (Greek), meaning crawler) is an extinct genus of crocodile-like temnospondyls from the late Permian (Changhsingian) period.These temnospondyls lived in modern-day Niger, which was once part of central Pangaea, about 250 million years ago. Nigerpeton is a member of the Cochleosauridae family, a group of edopoid temnospondyl amphibians known from the late Carboniferous (Pennsylvanian) and early Permian (Cisuralian).

== History and discovery ==
Joulia was the first to publish a notice of vertebrate remains in the Permian Moradi Formation, located in northern Niger in 1960. In the late 1960s, French paleontologists set out on three short expeditions to this formation but only described a single taxon, the captorhinid reptile Moradisaurus grandis. Taquet in 1978 was the first to mention any temnospondyl remains in the Upper Permian rocks in northern Niger but did not describe the fossils. In their 1982 description of the Moradisaurus grandis skull, Ricqlès and Taquet reported finding numerous temnospondyl remains during their three expeditions in the 1960s.

The first specimens of Nigerpeton were collected during fieldwork in 2000, 2003, and 2006, when new fossils representing two new temnospondyl genera were discovered by Sidor et al. These new temnospondyls were named by Sidor et al. as Nigerpeton ricqlesi and Saharastega moradiensis. These specimens were collected from a layer of conglomerate in the Moradi Formation, approximately 20 km west of Arlit in north-central Niger.

Previously, it was believed that edopoids lived only during the late Carboniferous and early Permian periods, and were restricted to a narrow latitudinal band in Europe and America straddling the paleo-equator. The discovery of these new edopoids in the Moradi formation extended the time span of early Euramerican edopoids and created awareness of new African species.

== Description ==
=== Skull ===
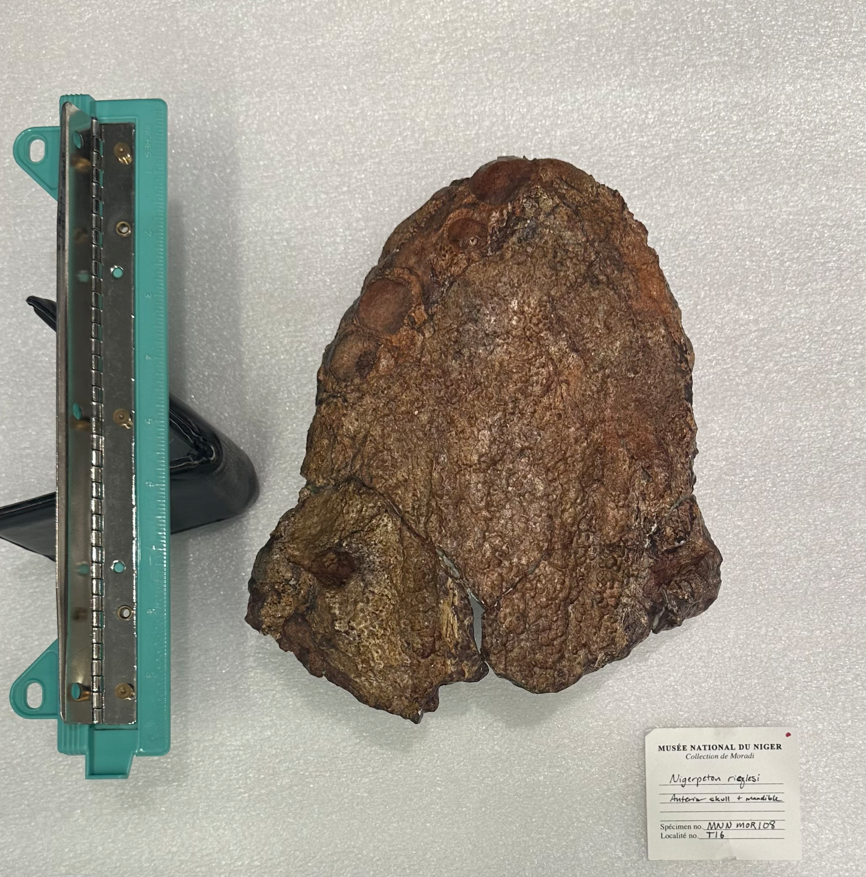
Skull of Nigerpeton Ricqlesi MNN MOR108 in dorsal view

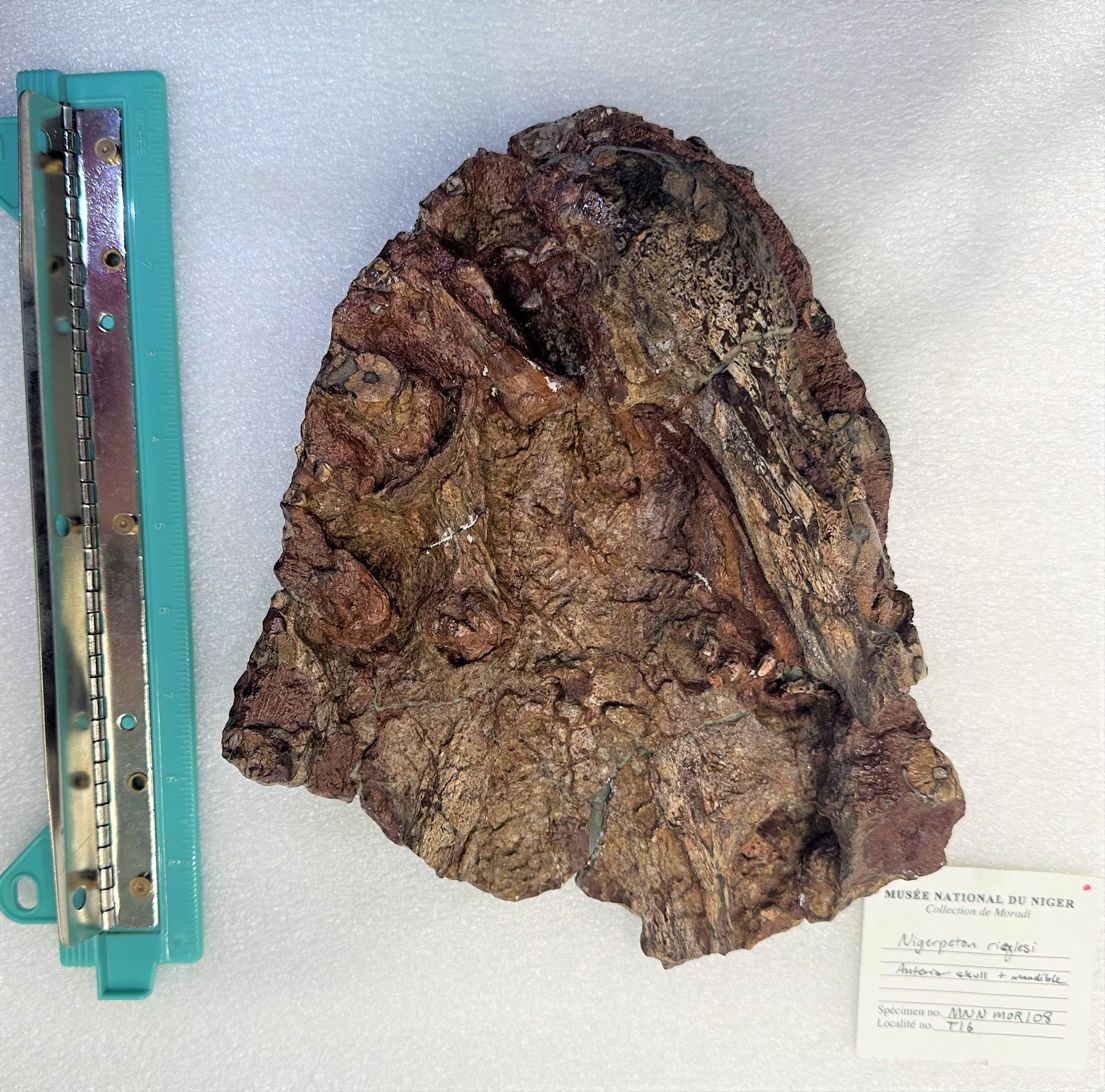
Mandible of Nigerpeton Ricqlesi MNN MOR108 in ventral view

When viewed dorsally, the Nigerpeton skull is triangular, a feature present in temnospondyl forms, and somewhat elongated in shape. The full skull length ranges from 45 cm to a midline length of 56 cm. Dermal bones are 2 to 6 mm in thickness. Along the lateral margins, the Nigerpeton skull is straight until it hits the external naris where lateral bulges are visible. This is a distinctive characteristic in Chochleosaurine. The orbits on Nigerpeton are located in the posterior and are dorsally elevated, with wide spacing in between the orbits on the roof of the skull. Due to the posterior positioning of the orbits, the skull has a very elongated preorbital region along with a short postorbital region, a distinctive condition of cochleosaurids. Nigerpeton holds a record for the longest preorbital region among edopoids, corresponding to more than 80% of its skull length. The tip of a Nigerpeton snout is rounded and pierced by two paired circular anterior cavities for positioning of the symphyseal tusks, a distinct feature in Nigerpeton. Anteriorly, the skull decreases in height, resulting in a flat snout with the external nostril rims elevated above the snout. Other features seen in the skulls are deep and wide longitudinal canals, covered by pronounced longitudinal ridges. The total skull length was large, at up to 75 centimetres (30 in).

Nigerpeton possesses a honey-comb pattern as an ornament trait on the roof of its skull and its mandible, as well as alternating and elongated ridges and groove ornamentation at the periphery and reaching toward the bone. This ridge and groove ornamentation has been suggestive of areas that experience intensive growth, for instance, the premaxillary, maxillary, and nasal regions which other edopids experience.

A lateral line system is visible in Nigerpeton during the adult stage, a sensory system that is only found in aquatic vertebrates. There are canals 3–10 mm wide and 3–6 mm deep located on the external surface of the skull, as well as preorbital canals on the anterior part of the snout. A depression located posteromedial to the anterior paired cavities could be indication of transverse prenarial sulus.

=== Post-cranial skeleton ===
Behind the Nigerpeton skull, an atlas was found consisting of a 41 mm high and 47 mm wide, well-ossified, and disk-shaped intercentrum. The intercentrum has a subtriangular profile measuring 21 mm in ventral length and shows a feasible attachment surface for the pluerocentrum on its right medial side. The posterior face is straight to convex while the anterior face is concaved.

About a meter from where one of the Nigerpeton fossils was located, three presacral vertebrae along with their associated ribs and an isolated femur were found. This vertebra consists of isolated neural arches, the usual shape of temnospondyls. The prezygapophyses are well developed with their contact face with the corresponding postzygapophyses being very elongated. Neural spines are elongated and posterodorsally oriented. Their lateral crests end in relatively smooth dorsolateral apophyses, which are a usual character in adult temnospondyls. The transverse processes is said to extend between 90 and 140 degrees from the body arch. Relative to Nigerpeton's small sized ribs and slight curvature this suggests the vertebrae be anteriorly located alongside the vertebral column.

== Paleobiology ==
=== Feeding ecology ===
Nigerpeton's unique dentation suggests a highly carnivorous ecology. Even though complete Nigerpeton teeth are not available, the visible tooth row shows the dentation was usually rounded in cross-section like in non-stereospondyl temnospondyls. Nigerpeton’s great heterodonty such as the numerous and differently sized marginal and palatal tusks is great among temnospondyls and is likely associated with the capability to catch and sustain prey in the mouth before swallowing.

== Classification ==
Nigerpeton belongs to the clade Cochleosauridae, a subdivision of the greater clade Edopoidea. Edopoidea belongs to the clade Temnospondyli so there are many cranial features that unite Nigerpeton to the basal temnospondyl clade Edopoidea.

The cladogram below shows the relationships between these clades based on Sidor et al., 2005 and Steyer et al., 2006, which were based on the matrix of Sequeria 2004 who proposed a phylogeny of 17 basal temnospondyls constructed from an analysis of 61 characters.

- Edopoidea
  - - Edops
    - Cochleosauridae
      - Procochleosaurus
      - - - Adamanterpeton
          - - Cochleosaurinae
              - Cochleosaurus florensis
              - Cochleosaurus bohemicus
            - - Nigerpeton
              - - Chenoprosopus milleri
                - Chenoprosopus lewisi

== Paleoenvironment ==
All Nigerpeton specimens were retrieved from the upper one-third of the Moradi Formation located in Arlit, Niger, a late Permian formation approximately 259 to 252 Ma. During this geologic period, the region was part of Central Pangea. During the Late Permian, desert-like conditions replaced the previous moderate climate according to geologic data and climate simulations. Recent work exhibits that arid to hyperarid conditions occurred during Moradi deposition.
