= Moradi Formation =

Geologic formation in Niger

- Stratigraphic range: Guadalupian to Lopingian; ~270–251 Ma
- Type: Geological formation
- Unit of: Izégouandane Group
- Sub-units: Lower, Middle and Upper Units
- Underlies: Teloua 1 Formation
- Overlies: Tamamaït Formation
- Thickness: 100 metres (330 ft)

Lithology
- Primary: Mudstone, siltstone
- Other: Sandstone, conglomerate

Location
- Coordinates: 18.8°N 7.2°E
- Approximate paleocoordinates: 16.6°S 8.2°E
- Region: Agadez Region
- Country: Niger
- Extent: Iullemmeden Basin
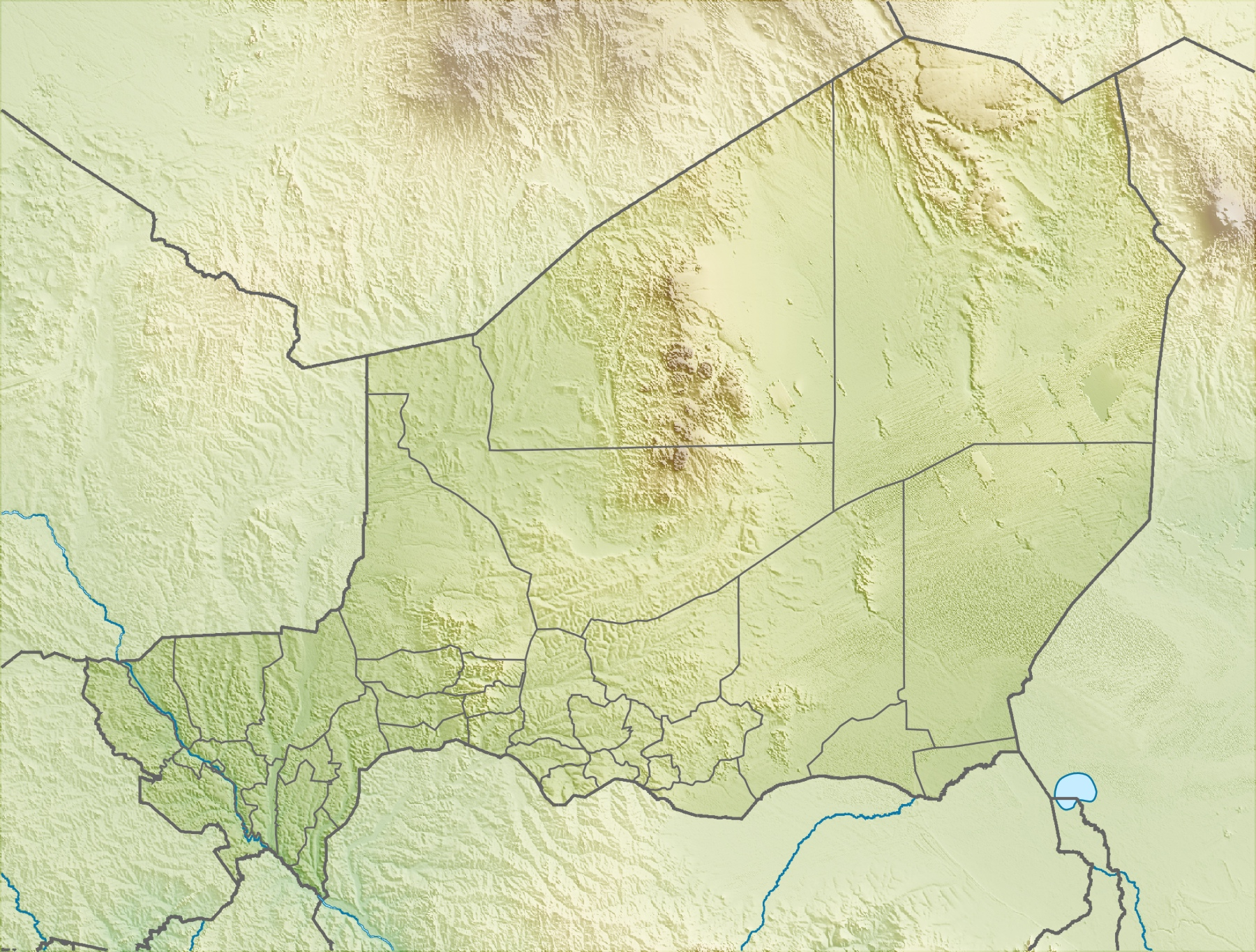
- Moradi Formation (Niger)

The Moradi Formation is a geological formation in Niger. It preserves the fossils of numerous tetrapods, including reptiles and synapsids.

== Description ==
It is of Guadalupian to Lopingian age. Some recent publications proposed to refine the age to Changhsingian, but the papers that directly studied its age actually support only a much less precise age assignment. Early studies, published in the 1960 and 1970s placed it in the Upper Permian because at the time, the Permian was divided into Lower and Upper Permian only, and the Upper Permian then included most or all of what is now considered Middle Permian. All fossils are found only in a 10 m section of the uppermost part of the formation. It is informally divided into three subunits. The lower portion of the formation consists of red mudstone, with muddy calcareous sandstone and quartz-granlule conglomerate present as lenses. The middle portion consists of muddy siltstone in thick beds interbedded with red argillaceous sandstone. The lower two thirds of the upper portion of the formation consist of red siltstone intercalated with channel lag intraformational conglomerates, while the upper third consists of barchanoid shaped lenses of conglomeratic sandstone with ventifacts. These facies are indicatived of deposition under arid conditions, with less than 300 millimetres (12 in) of annual rainfall in the Central Pangean desert, with annual temperatures of 30 to 35 °C (86 to 95 °F), but with ephemeral water presence including lakes.

== Fossil content ==
Dicynodonts, widespread in other contemporary deposits, appear to be absent, with previous reports being in error. The flora of the formation includes indeterminate voltzian conifers.

=== Synapsida ===
Genus	Species	Notes	Images
Rubidgeinae indet.	Indeterminate	An indeterminate rubidgine gorgonopsian	Life restoration of the rubidgeiine Broomicephalus

=== Reptiliomorpha ===
Genus	Species	Notes	Images
Bunostegos	B. akokanensis	A pareiasaurian reptile	
Moradisaurus	M. grandis	A large captorhinid	

=== Temnospondyli ===
Genus	Species	Notes
Nigerpeton	N. ricqlesi	A cochleosaurid temnospondyl
Saharastega	S. moradiensis	A basal temnospondyl
