= Yellow Creek, Ohio =

- Unincorporated community
- Location within Ohio
- Coordinates: 40°34′28″N 80°40′03″W
- Country: United States
- State: Ohio
- Counties: Jefferson
- Elevation: 679 ft (207 m)
- Time zone: UTC-5 (Eastern (EST))
  - Summer (DST): UTC-4 (EDT)
- ZIP code: 43968
- Area code: 740
- GNIS feature ID: 1061806

Yellow Creek (previously also known as Linton) is an unincorporated community in Saline Township, Jefferson County, Ohio, United States. It is located northwest of Hammondsville at the intersection of Ohio State Route 7 and Ohio State Route 213 where the Yellow Creek empties into the Ohio River, at 40°34′28″N 80°40′03″W.

The Linton Post Office was established as Mouth of Yellow Creek Post Office (in Columbiana County) on May 12, 1832, and the name changed to Linton Post Office on March 30, 1855. The branch was discontinued on September 30, 1901.

A famous fossil deposit ("the Linton site") is located at Yellow Creek. It is within the Allegheny Group of Carboniferous (Pennsylvanian)- age sedimentary rocks.
