= Macrerpeton =

Macrerpeton Temporal range: Pennsylvanian–Moscovian

Scientific classification
- Domain: Eukaryota
- Kingdom: Animalia
- Phylum: Chordata
- Order: †Temnospondyli
- Family: †Cochleosauridae
- Genus: †Macrerpeton; Moodie, 1909
- Species: †M. huxleyi

Binomial name
- †Macrerpeton huxleyi (Cope, 1875) (type is Tuditanus huxleyi)

Extinct genus of temnospondyls

Macrerpeton is a genus of edopoid temnospondyl within the family Cochleosauridae. It contains a single species, Macrerpeton huxleyi. It was discovered in the fossil-rich Allegheny Formation of Linton, Ohio.
