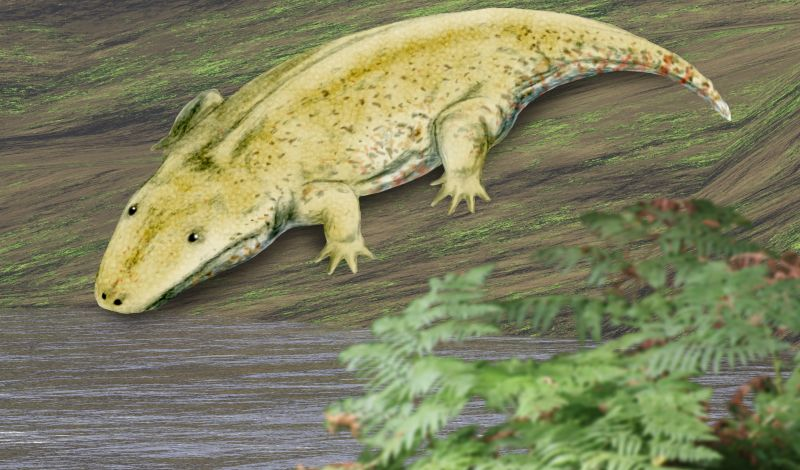
- Life reconstruction

Scientific classification
- Kingdom: Animalia
- Phylum: Chordata
- Clade: Stegocephali
- Clade: Tetrapoda
- Order: †Temnospondyli
- Genus: †Saharastega; Sidor et al., 2005

Type species
- †Saharastega moradiensis Sidor et al., 2005

= Saharastega =

Saharastega Temporal range: Upper Permian

Extinct genus of amphibians

Saharastega is an extinct genus of basal temnospondyl which lived during the Late Permian period, around 251 to 260 million years ago. Remains of Saharastega, discovered by paleontologist Christian Sidor at the Moradi Formation in Niger, were described briefly in 2005 and more comprehensively in 2006. The description is based on a skull lacking the lower jaws.

== Description ==
=== Skull roof ===
The skull is somewhat wide and gradually narrows towards the snout, with the portion of the skull in front of the orbits (eye sockets) longer than that behind them. It was 36.8 centimeters (14.5 inches) in length and 30 centimeters (11.8 inches) in width at its widest point. The cranial bones are somewhat eroded, but preserved portions are finely textured with pits and ridges as in most adult temnospondyls, but lacking the unornamented areas adjacent to the midline which characterize edopoids. The skull lacks lateral line grooves, which may indicate terrestriality, but the overall size and shape is akin to aquatic temnospondyls. The numerous teeth were broken, but their bases were all the same size and elliptical in cross-section.

The nares (nostril holes) are narrow and angled almost perpendicular to the long axis of the skull, a unique feature which is dissimilar to the nares of other temnospondyls, which were either circular or angled parallel to the long axis of the skull. The orbits are small, rounded, and widely separated. The pineal foramen is absent. The suspensorium (jaw joint) is shifted forwards, which has the effect of twisting the quadrate bones forwards and closing up the squamosal embayments (large emarginations along the rear of the skull also known as "otic notches").

The arrangement of the cranial bones is generally similar to that of other early temnospondyls. The nasal bones (on the upper surface of the snout) are long, while the frontal and parietal bones (at the rear of the skull) are wide, which are traits related to the skull proportions. The lacrimal bones (on the side of the snout) are isolated, contacting neither the nares nor the orbits. These traits are akin to the cochleosaurid Chenoprosopus, but Saharastega lacks the characteristic postparietal shape of cochleosaurids. As with other early temnospondyls (but not later members of the group), Saharastega retains an intertemporal bone behind the eyes. Likewise, the supratemporal bone forms a portion of the rear edge of the skull, rather than being excluded by the tabular and squamosal bones which were present in that area. The tabulars themselves were uniquely shaped. They were thick, bluntly-tipped bones which twisted outwards and downwards along the rear edge of the skull. This is in contrast to other temnospondyls, which generally had smaller, triangular tabulars directed straight back.

The braincase was complex and strongly built, though it was rather shallow owing to the short height of the skull. Unusually among temnospondyls, the skull possessed a large plate of bone above the foramen magnum, which underlaid a system of ridges forming an inverted T shape. This plate of bone may have been a single large supraoccipital, which was rare among Paleozoic amphibians, but was more likely formed by a contribution of the supraoccipital and postparietal bones as in baphetoids. This portion of the skull was somewhat similar to that of the dvinosaurian Isodectes. The exoccipital bones on either side of the foramen magnum stretch downwards to underscore the braincase, a rare feature also seen in some "advanced" temnospondyls.

=== Palate ===
The palate (roof of the mouth) is similar to that of Chenoprosopus and other early temnospondyls. The bones of the palate are covered with small, dome-like structures known as denticles. The interpterygoid vacuities (holes between the pterygoid bones which were characteristic of temnospondyls) were relatively small and semicircular, located more than halfway towards the rear of the skull. Their small size and rearward location means that their outer edge was completely formed by the pterygoid bones, without any contribution from other palatal bones at the edge of the skull. There was also a small, circular pair of holes ("anterior palatal vacuities") at the tip of the snout and elongated, rectangular choanae along the edge of the snout. The premaxilla bones at the tip of the snout had a complex tongue-and-groove connection to the maxilla bones directly behind them. This configuration, which is only visible from the palate, is seemingly unique to Saharastega among temnospondyls. The pterygoid bones had a narrow, bulbous contact with the parasphenoid bone (which forms the base of the braincase). While this contact is by no means flexible, it does contrast with the larger and more robust connection present in later temnospondyls.

On the other hand, the palate also has several features in line with more "advanced" temnospondyls. A small depression known as a "fossa subrostralis media" was present where the premaxillae contact each other along the midpoint of the snout tip. This depression is also known is several stereospondylomorphs. Each of the large, plate-like vomer bones lie between the choanae and possess a single diagonally-oriented row of teeth (known as a "transvomerine tooth row") as well as a large fang. Vomer fangs (and palatal fangs in general) are abundant among early tetrapods, but a transvomerine tooth row is characteristic of "advanced" temnospondyls rather than early taxa such as edopoids.

== Classification ==
The first papers to discuss or describe Saharastega considered it to be part of the group Edopoidea, an early branch of temnospondyl amphibians. Most edopoids lived in the Carboniferous, but Saharastega (and its equally unusual contemporary Nigerpeton) survived until the late Permian as a relict of the early temnospondyl radiation. Saharastega shares some seemingly unique features with edopoids (particularly the shape of the lacrimal bone), and particularly resembles the cochelosaurids, but also is dissimilar from edopoids in many ways. In the original papers, Saharastega was generally placed at the very base of Edopoidea. Regardless, it was clear that Saharastega was very basal ("primitive") compared to most temnospondyls, due to the retention of intertemporals, absence of lateral lines, small interpterygoid vacuities, and a narrow contact between the palate and braincase.

Since these studies, the position of Saharastega has been controversial. Pawley (2006) placed it deeper within the edopoids, as the sister taxon to Cochleosauridae. An informal suggestion by Australian paleontologist Adam Yates even proposed that it was not a temnospondyl at all, but rather a seymouriamorph based on general similarities to the skull of Seymouria. McHugh (2012) tentatively placed it crownward within Temnospondyli (i.e. deeper within the temnospondyl family tree) by placing it as an eryopoid related to Zatracheidae. A comprehensive 2013 study of temnospondyl relations did not include Saharastega due to it being an unstable taxon.

Marjanovic & Laurin (2019) utilized Saharastega as part of their many reanalyses of Ruta & Coates (2007)'s tetrapod study. The original 2007 study did not include Saharastega, so it was added along with Nigerpeton and many other taxa in some of the reanalyses. Although Marjanovic & Laurin (2019) did not place Saharastega close to cochleosaurids or other edopoids (at least in their parsimony analyses), the study consistently placed it as the sister taxon to Nigerpeton. The clade containing these two unusual temnospondyls had an inconsistent placement, with a connection to Eryops, stereospondylomorphs, or the very base of Temnospondyli each considered equally likely. The main purpose of Marjanovic & Laurin (2019)'s study was to analyze different origins for modern lissamphibians. When the study restrained its results so that some or all modern lissamphibians were members of Temnospondyli, the results shifted the internal structure of the temnospondyl family tree. In these restrained reanalyses, Saharastega and Nigerpeton could additionally be within Stereospondylomorpha or close to Dvinosauria, meaning that there were five equally likely positions under certain parsimony methodologies, which relied on the principal that the simplest family tree is the most likely.

On the other hand, the single bootstrap analysis of Marjanovic & Laurin (2019) which included Saharastega and Nigerpeton concluded that they were cochleosaurids. The connection between the Saharastega and Nigerpeton was relatively robust, found by 50% of bootstrap trees. Their connection to cochleosaurids was much more tentative, found by only 4% of bootstrap trees, although this was still the most consistent position under the bootstrap methodology. The bayesian analysis had a similar (but less unsteady) result, placing Saharastega and Nigerpeton (connected by 99% of bayesian trees) next to the cochleosaurid Chenoprosopus (connected by 33% of bayesian trees).
