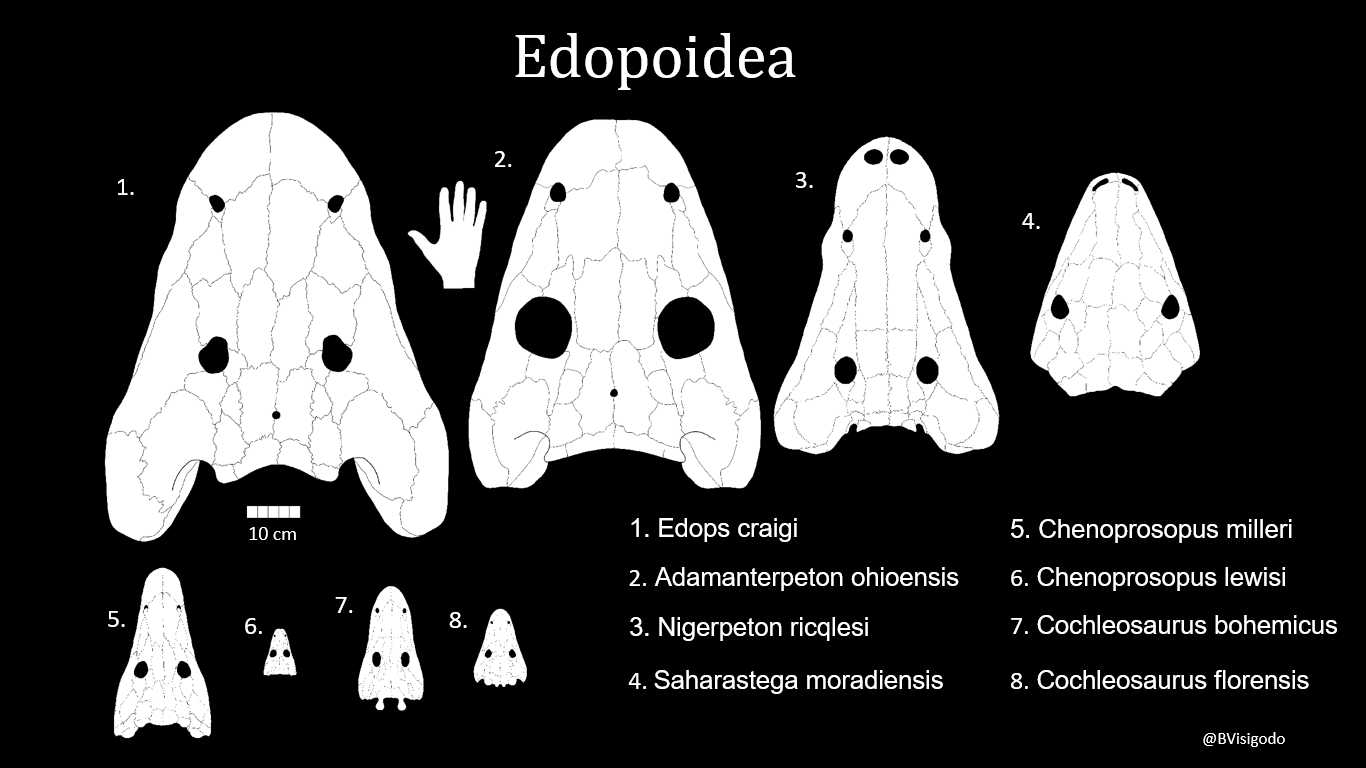
- Diagram of edopoid skulls

Scientific classification
- Domain: Eukaryota
- Kingdom: Animalia
- Phylum: Chordata
- Order: †Temnospondyli
- Superfamily: †Edopoidea; Romer, 1945

Subgroups
- see text

= Edopoidea =

Edopoids Temporal range: Late Carboniferous - Late Permian 310–252 Ma Possible Viséan record in the form of fossil tracks.

Extinct superfamily of amphibians

Edopoidea is a clade of primitive temnospondyl amphibians including the genus Edops and the family Cochleosauridae. Edopoids are known from the Late Carboniferous and Early Permian of North America and Europe, and the Late Permian of Africa. They are among the most basal temnospondyls, and possess a number of primitive features that were lost in later members of the group.

== Description ==
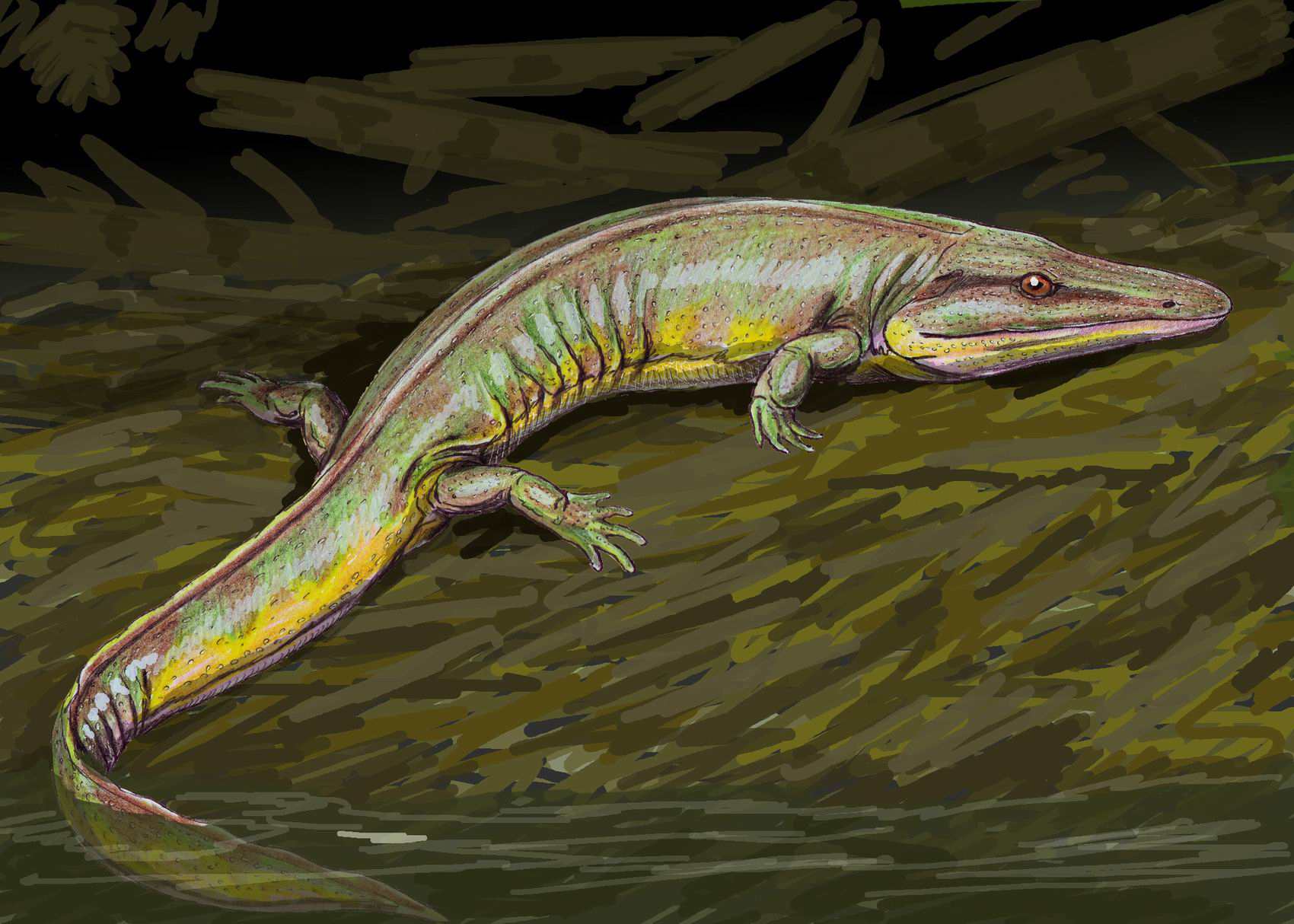
Life restoration of the cochleosaurid Chenoprosopus milleri

Edopoids are relatively large temnospondyls, with many species estimated to have grown several meters in length. The skull of Edops is broad while those of cochleosaurids are narrower and elongated. Distinguishing features of edopoids include the presence of an intertemporal bone that is absent in all other temnospondyls, and the lack of a pineal foramen, a small hole on the skull roof of many early tetrapods (young individuals still possess this hole). Relative to other temnospondyls, edopoids also have enlarged premaxillae, maxillae, and nasal bones in the snout region, which constrict the nostrils to small holes and push them to the sides of the skull. Most edopoids lacked grooves in the skull called sensory sulci, which presumably supported a lateral line system in other temnospondyls. The lack of sensory sulci suggests that most edopoids were adapted to terrestrial lifestyles, as lateral lines are characteristic of aquatic animals. Nigerpeton is the only edopoid to possess sensory sulci, but only in its adult form. The skulls of edopoids have only one occipital condyle connecting them to the vertebrae of the neck, whereas more derived temnospondyls have two occipital condyles.

== Classification ==
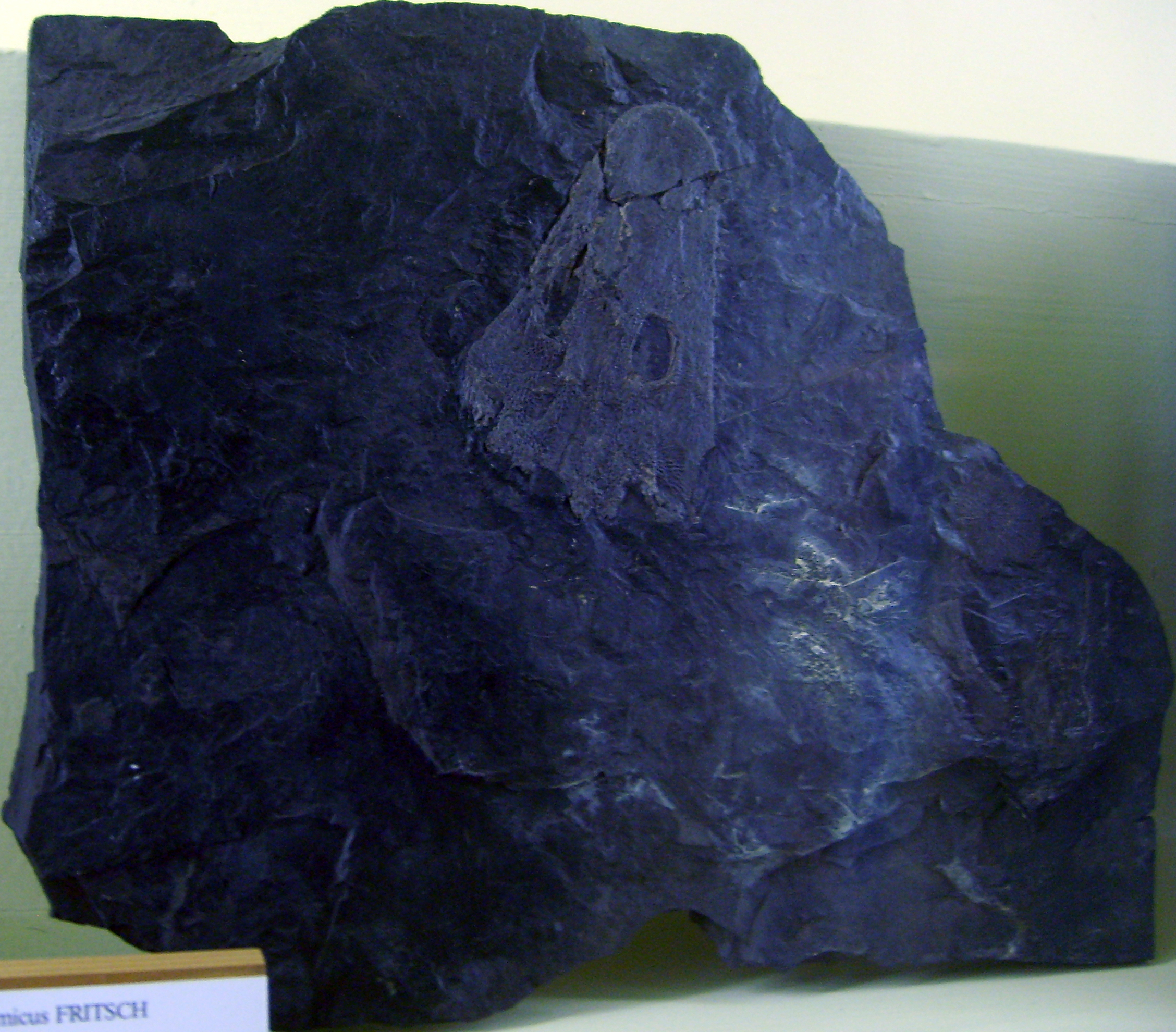
Skull of Cochleosaurus bohemicus in the Museum für Naturkunde, Berlin

Edopoidea was named as a superfamily of temnospondyls by American paleontologist Alfred Romer in the second edition of his textbook Vertebrate Paleontology, published in 1945. He recognized a close relationship between the families Edopidae (which includes only Edops) and Cochleosauridae. In the late 1980s and early 1990s, the relationship between these two groups was supported by many phylogenetic analyses. One phylogenetic analysis separated Edops and cochleosaurids, finding the cochleosaurids to group with more derived temnospondyls like Archegosaurus.

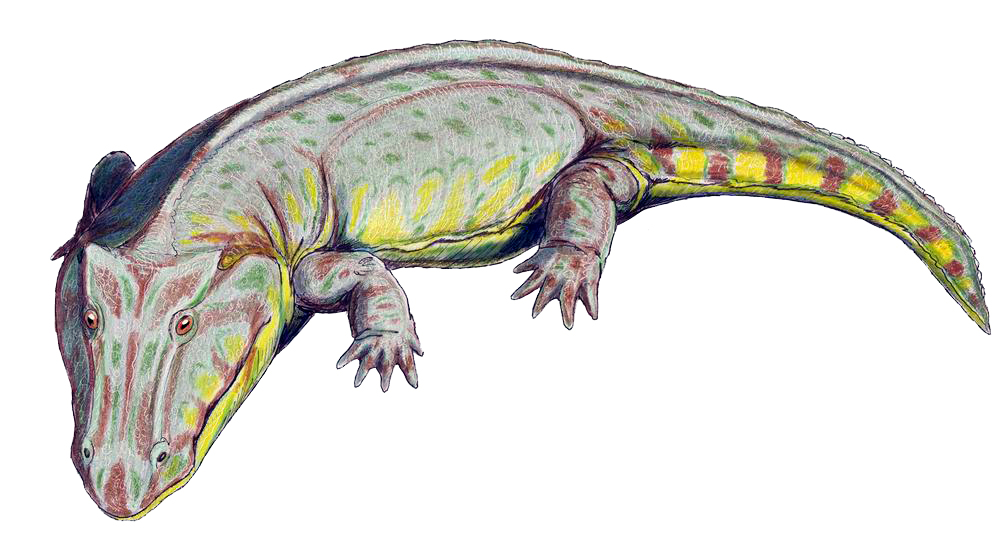
Life restoration of Edops craigi, the most basal edopoid

However, the skull characteristics used in this analysis are common to almost all temnospondyls with elongated skulls, and are not strong evidence of evolutionary relationships because long snouts could easily have appeared through evolutionary convergence. Most recent phylogenetic analyses support a sister group relationship between Edops and Cochleosauridae, meaning that they are each other's closest relatives. Edopoids are usually placed at the base of Temnospondyli along with other primitive forms like Dendrerpeton, Balanerpeton, and Capetus. Below is a cladogram showing the relationships of edopoids from Sidor et al. (2006):

- Temnospondyli
  - Balanerpeton woodi
  - Capetus palustris
  - - Saharastega moradiensis
    - - Edopoidea
        - Edops craigi
        - Cochleosauridae
          - Procochleosaurus jarrowensis
          - - Adamanterpeton ohioensis
            - Cochleosaurinae
              - - Cochleosaurus bohemicus
                - Cochleosaurus florensis
              - - Nigerpeton ricqlesi
                - - Chenoprosopus milleri
                  - Chenoprosopus lewisi
      - Eryops megacephalus and other derived temnospondyls

== Paleobiology ==
Most edopoids are known from the Late Carboniferous and Early Permian of Europe and North America, which at the time formed a larger continent called Euramerica. Procochleosaurus, the oldest edopoid, is known from Ireland, while Edops, the most basal edopoid, is known from the United States, strongly suggesting that the group originated in Euramerica. Tropical and subtropical environments were likely widespread across Euramerica during the Carboniferous and Early Permian, meaning that edopoids could easily travel between what are now North America and Europe.

The edopoid Nigerpeton is known from the Late Permian of Africa, extending the time span of edopoids by about 40 million years and expanding their geographic range outside Euramerica. It lived in a mountainous tropical region near the equator that is thought to have been a refugium for temnospondyls during the end of the Permian. At this time, the equatorial region was likely bounded by deserts to the north and south, which were too arid for amphibious animals like edopoids.
