= Intertemporal bone =

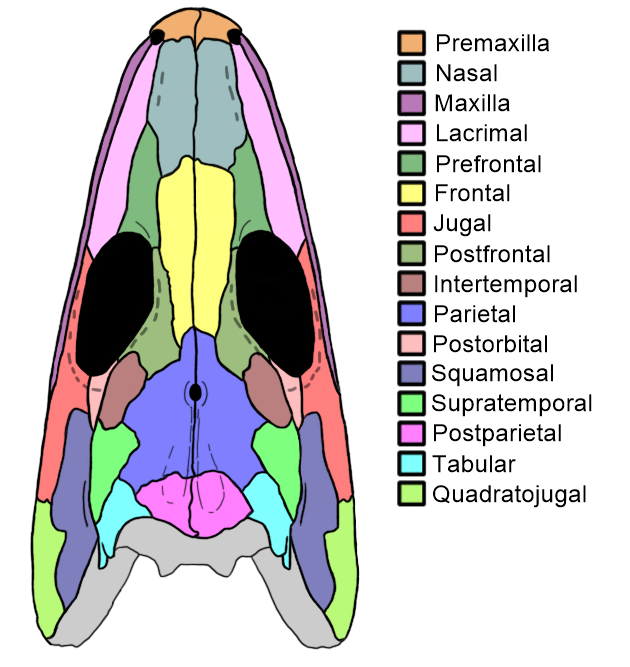
The skull of Proterogyrinus, an embolomere which retains the intertemporal (in maroon).

The intertemporal bone is a paired cranial bone present in certain sarcopterygians (lobe-finned fish) and extinct amphibian-grade tetrapods. It lies in the rear part of the skull, behind the eyes.

Many lineages of four-limbed vertebrates ("tetrapods" in the broad sense) have lost the intertemporal bone. These include Acanthostega, Icththyostega, colosteids (except for a vestigial intertemporal in Greererpeton), diadectomorphs, lepospondyls, and amniotes. Lissamphibians (i.e. modern amphibians like frogs, salamanders, and caecilians) also lack an intertemporal. Most temnospondyls lack an intertemporal, though several early groups like edopoids, dvinosaurs, and various other basal taxa retain the bone.

Tetrapod groups which do possess an intertemporal typically have it contact the parietal bone along its inner edge, the postfrontal and postorbital bones along its front and/or outer edge, and the supratemporal bone along its rear edge. Rarely, the intertemporal may also contact the squamosal bone at a point between its contact with the postorbital and supratemporal. When the intertemporal bone is lost, either the postfrontal and supratemporal lengthen to contact each other (or the tabular bone in case the supratemporal is also lost), or the parietal widens to contact the postorbital.

It has been suggested that the intertemporal is homologous to the postorbital plate of placoderms and the dermosphenotic bone of actinopterygians (ray-finned fish).
