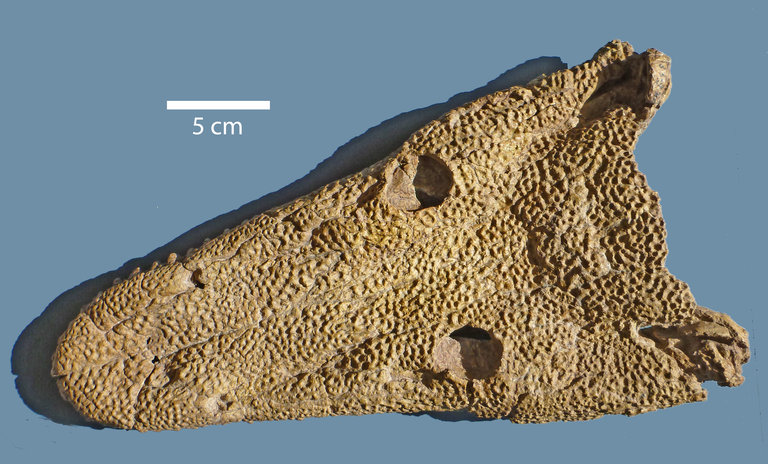
- Chenoprosopus

Scientific classification
- Kingdom: Animalia
- Phylum: Chordata
- Clade: Tetrapoda
- Order: †Temnospondyli
- Superfamily: †Edopoidea
- Family: †Cochleosauridae; Broili, 1923

Genera
- †Adamanterpeton; †Chenoprosopus; †Cochleosaurus; †Macrerpeton; †Nigerpeton; †Gaudrya; †Procochleosaurus

= Cochleosauridae =

Cochleosauridae Temporal range: 310–252 Ma

Extinct family of temnospondyls

Cochleosauridae is a family of edopoid temnospondyl amphibians, among the most basal of temnospondyls. Most members of this family are known from the late Carboniferous (Pennsylvanian) and early Permian (Cisuralian) of Europe and North America, though Nigerpeton is known from the Late Permian (Lopingian) of Niger in North Africa.

== Gallery ==
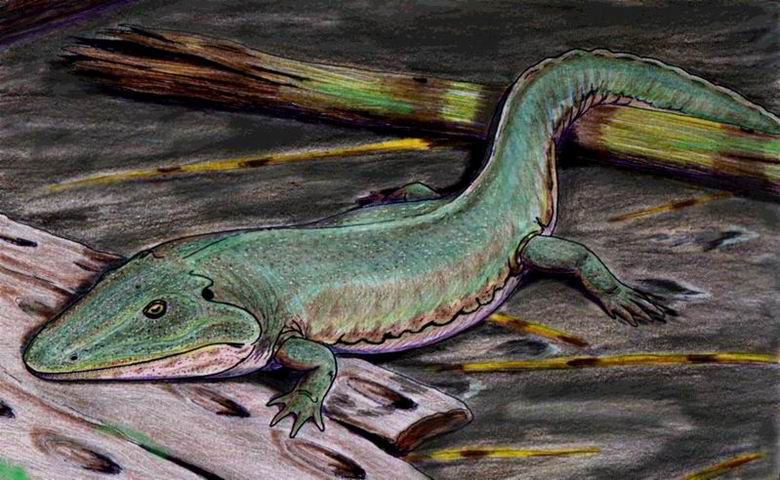
Cochleosaurus, of the late Carboniferous of central Europe and Nova Scotia

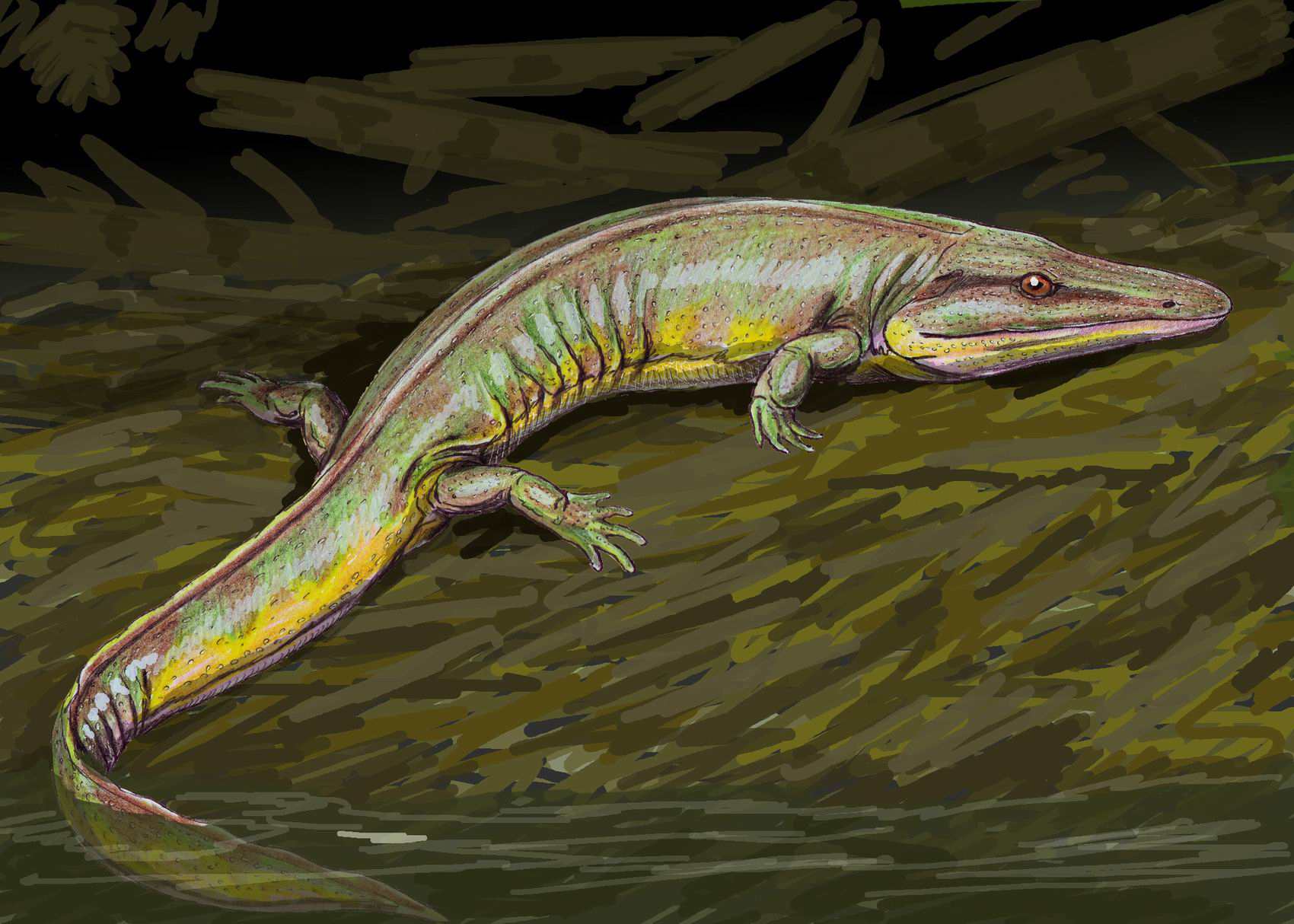
Chenoprosopus milleri, of the late Carboniferous and early Permian of New Mexico

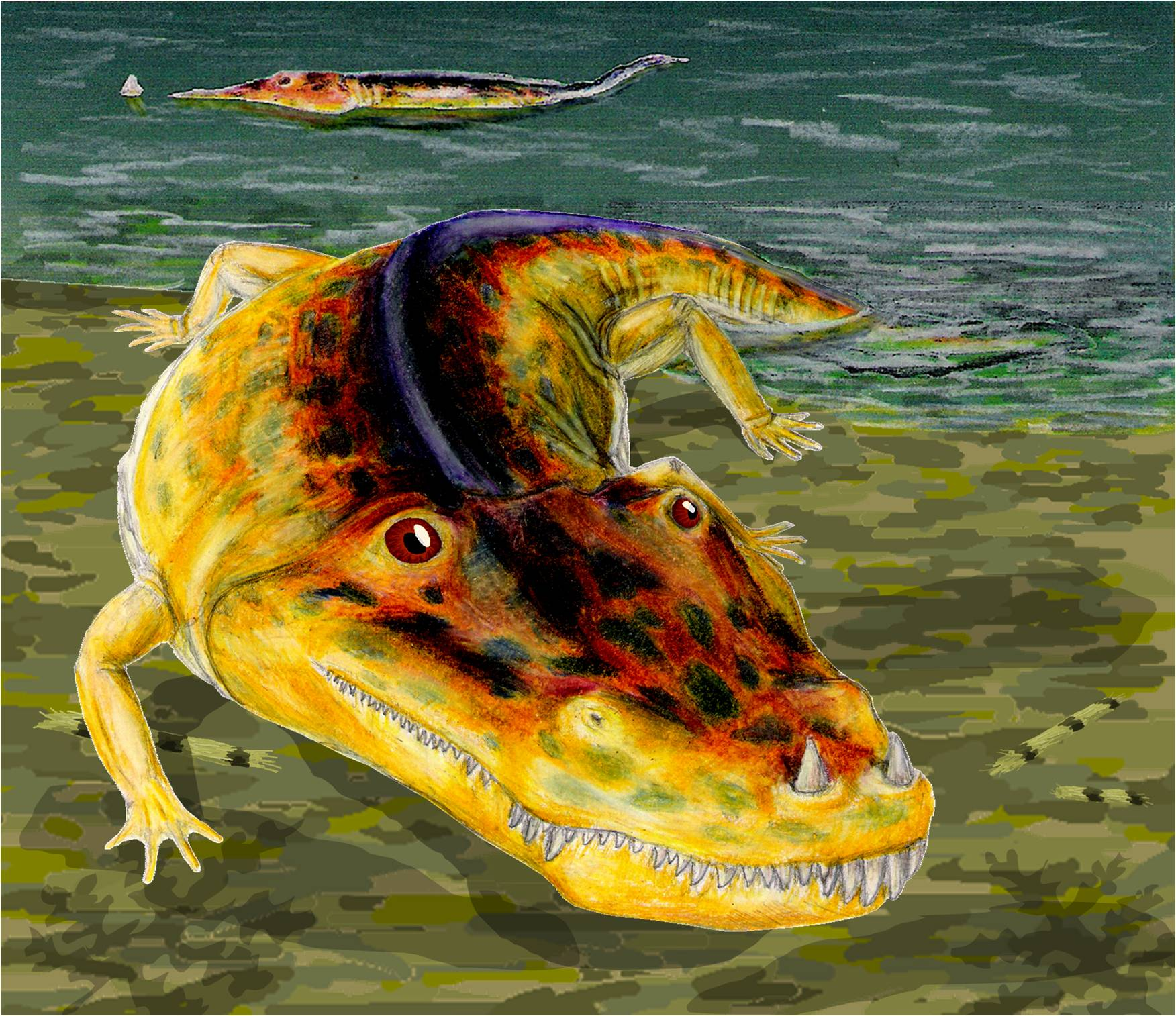
Nigerpeton ricqlesi, of the late Permian of Niger

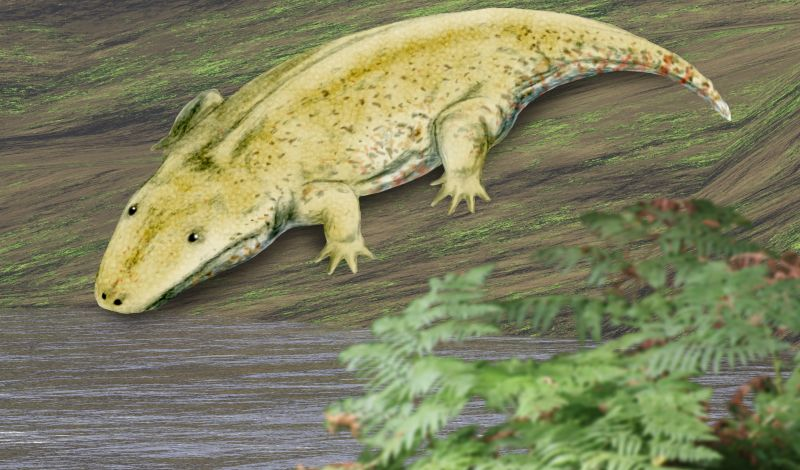
Saharastega moradiensis, a possible cochleosaurid of the late Permian of Niger
