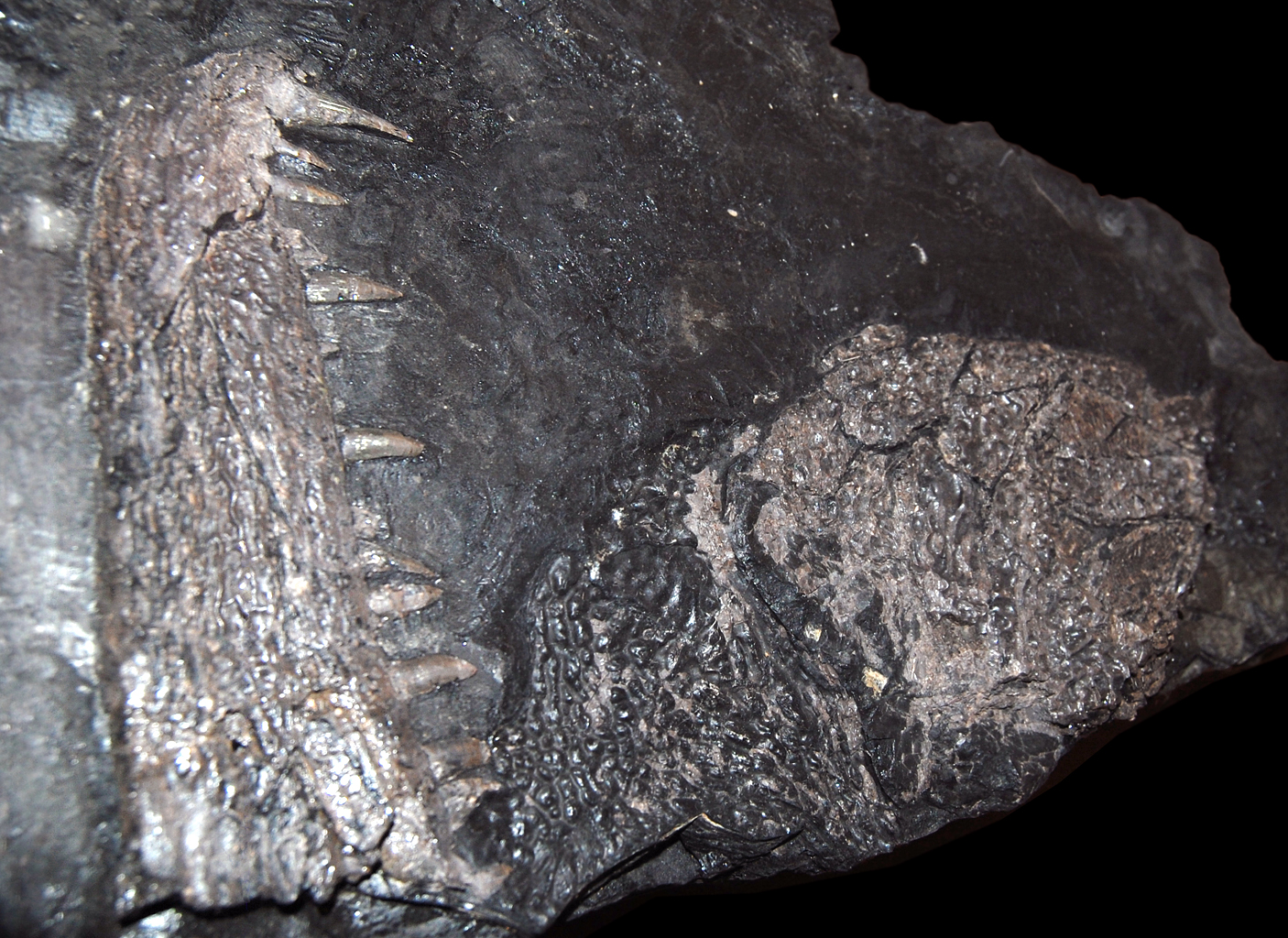
- Fossil in Vienna

Scientific classification
- Kingdom: Animalia
- Phylum: Chordata
- Clade: Tetrapoda
- Order: †Temnospondyli
- Genus: †Capetus; Steen, 1938

= Capetus (amphibian) =

Capetus Temporal range: Late Carboniferous

Extinct genus of amphibians

Capetus is an extinct genus of temnospondyl from the Upper Carboniferous of the Czech Republic. It reached a length of 150 centimeters (4.92 feet).

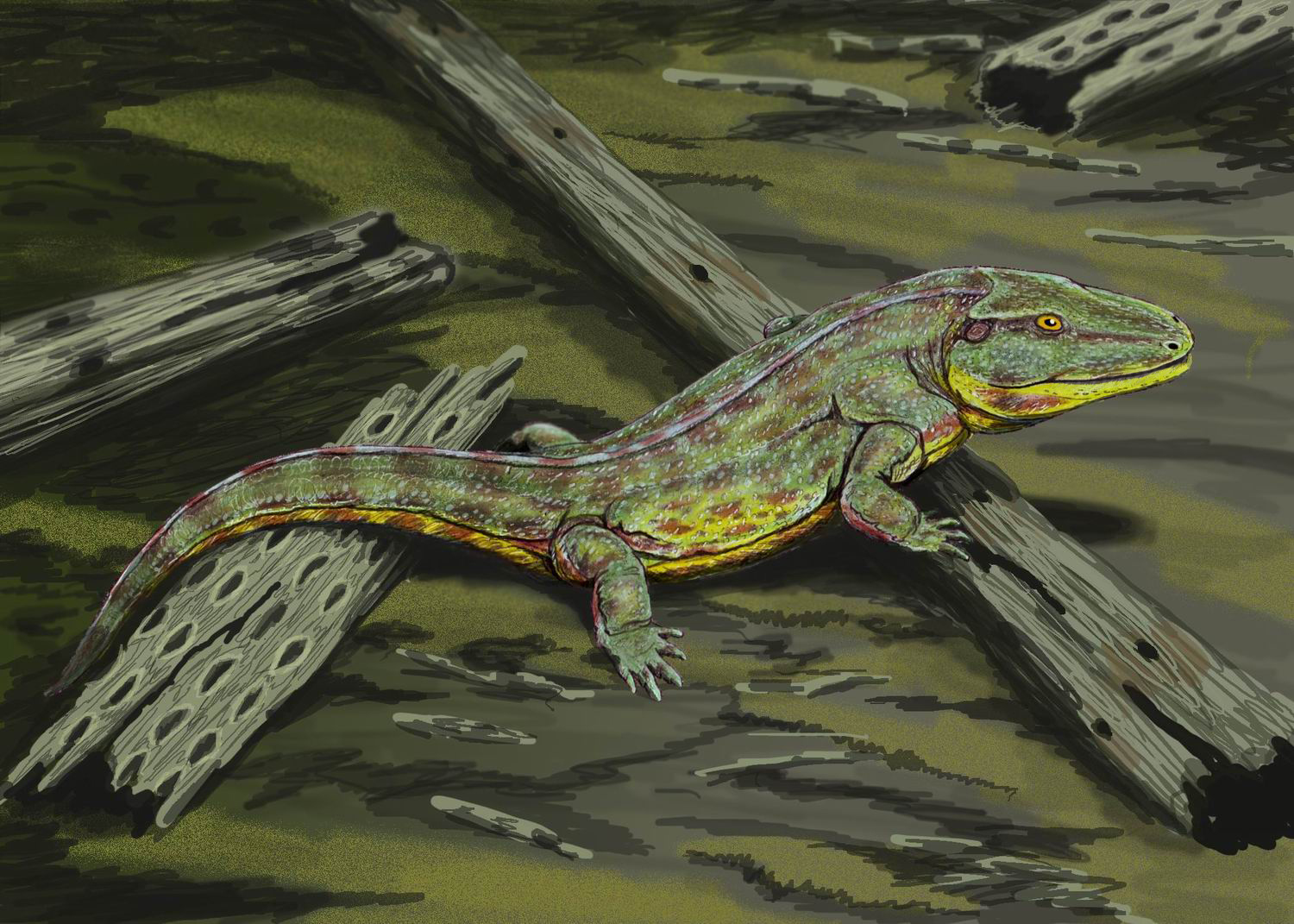
Life restoration
