= Procochleosaurus =

Procochleosaurus Temporal range: Upper Carboniferous

Scientific classification
- Domain: Eukaryota
- Kingdom: Animalia
- Phylum: Chordata
- Order: †Temnospondyli
- Superfamily: †Edopoidea
- Family: †Cochleosauridae
- Genus: †Procochleosaurus; Sequeira, 1996

Type species
- †Procochleosaurus jarrowensis Sequeira, 1996

Extinct genus of temnospondyls

Procochleosaurus is an extinct genus of cochleosaurid temnospondyl. Known from the Jarrow coal mines of Ireland, this genus is the oldest known member of the family Cochleosauridae. It was quite similar to Cochleosaurus, an early temnospondyl from the Czech Republic.
