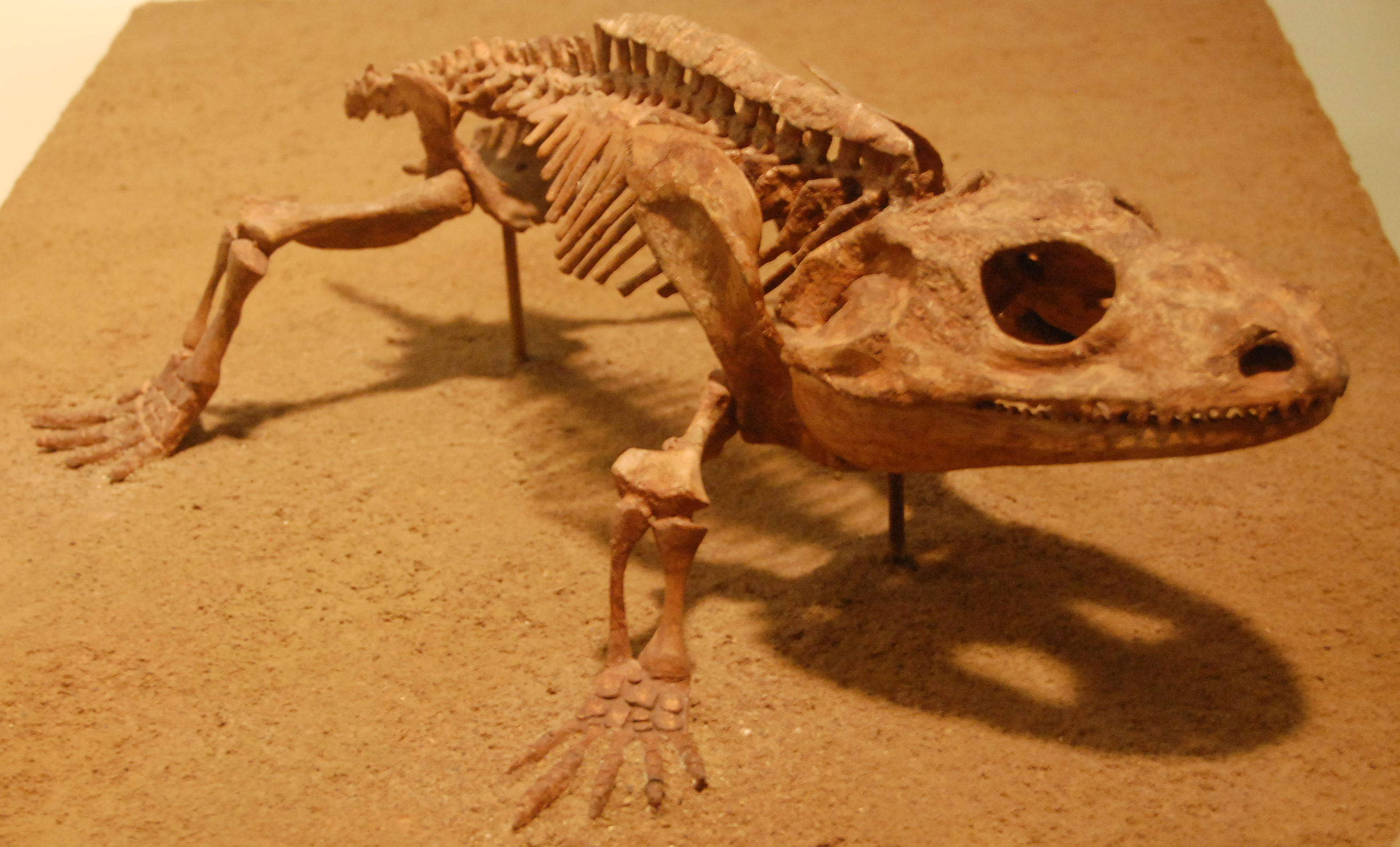
- Skeleton of Cacops

Scientific classification
- Domain: Eukaryota
- Kingdom: Animalia
- Phylum: Chordata
- Order: †Temnospondyli
- Clade: †Eutemnospondyli; Schoch, 2013

Genera
- See text

= Eutemnospondyli =

Eutemnospondyli Temporal range: Early Carboniferous - Early Cretaceous, 330–120 Ma Possible descendant taxon Lissamphibia survives to present.

Extinct clade of amphibians

Eutemnospondyli (meaning "true Temnospondyli") is a clade of temnospondyl amphibians that includes most temnospondyls except edopoids. Eutemnospondyli was named by German paleontologist Rainer R. Schoch in 2013. He defined it as a stem-based taxon including all temnospondyls more closely related to Stereospondyli than to Edopoidea. In his phylogenetic analysis, Eutemnospondyli included dendrerpetontids and a clade he referred to as Rhachitomi. Rhachitomi is defined to include four major and well-supported clades of temnospondyls: Dvinosauria, Eryopidae, Stereospondyli and a clade formed by Zatracheidae and Dissorophoidea. Below is a cladogram from Schoch's analysis:

- Temnospondyli
  - Edopoidea
  - Eutemnospondyli
    - "Dendrerpetontidae"
    - Rhachitomi
      - - Dvinosauria
        - - Zatracheidae
          - Dissorophoidea
      - Eryopiformes
        - Eryopidae
        - Stereospondylomorpha
          - Sclerocephalus
          - - Glanochthon
            - - Archegosaurus
              - - Australerpeton
                - Stereospondyli
                  - Rhinesuchidae
                  - - Lydekkerina
                    - - Capitosauria
                      - Trematosauria
