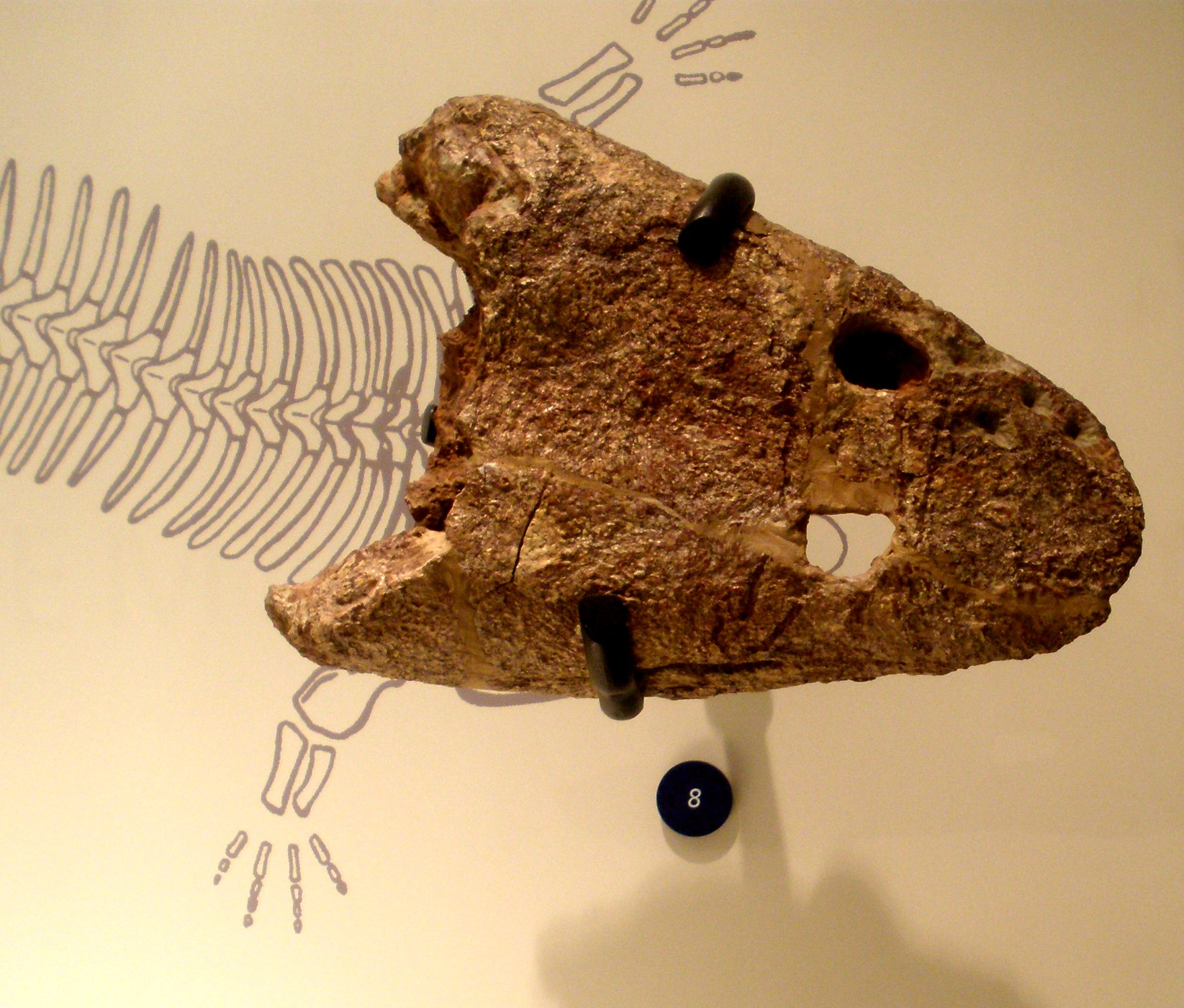
- Skull of Trimerorhachis insignis

Scientific classification
- Domain: Eukaryota
- Kingdom: Animalia
- Phylum: Chordata
- Order: †Temnospondyli
- Clade: †Eutemnospondyli
- Clade: †Rhachitomi; Watson, 1919

Genera
- See text

= Rhachitomi =

Rhachitomi Temporal range: Early Carboniferous - Early Cretaceous, 330–120 Ma Possible descendant taxon Lissamphibia survives to present.

Extinct clade of amphibians

Rhachitomi is a group of temnospondyl amphibians that includes all temnospondyls except edopoids and dendrerpetontids. It was established as a clade name by German paleontologist Rainer R. Schoch in 2013, although the name had first been established in 1919 by British paleontologist D. M. S. Watson to encompass an evolutionary grade of temnospondyls leading to the group Stereospondyli. American paleontologist Alfred Romer used the term in a similar sense, grouping most Permian and Triassic temnospondyls under Rhachitomi. A similar name that appeared earlier in the scientific literature is Rachitomi, which was named by American paleontologist Edward Drinker Cope in 1882. Rachitomi was commonly used in the late nineteenth and early twentieth century to include early amphibians such as Eryops and Archegosaurus that had rhachitomous vertebrae. Many early tetrapods have vertebrae that are split into two parts below the notochord: a pleurocentrum and an intercentrum. In rhachitomous vertebrae, the intercentrum is large and semicircular, while the pleurocentrum divided into two smaller paired elements. Schoch defined Rhachitomi as a node-based taxon to include four major and well-supported clades of temnospondyls: Dvinosauria, Eryopidae, Stereospondyli and a clade formed by Zatracheidae and Dissorophoidea. Not all members of Rhachitomi have rhachitomous vertebrae; the largest subgroup, Stereospondyli, lacks pleurocentra. Below is a cladogram from Schoch's analysis showing the placement of Rhachitomi within Temnospondyli:

- Temnospondyli
  - Edopoidea
  - Eutemnospondyli
    - "Dendrerpetontidae"
    - Rhachitomi
      - - Dvinosauria
        - - Zatracheidae
          - Dissorophoidea
      - Eryopiformes
        - Eryopidae
        - Stereospondylomorpha
          - Sclerocephalus
          - - Glanochthon
            - - Archegosaurus
              - - Australerpeton
                - Stereospondyli
                  - Rhinesuchidae
                  - - Lydekkerina
                    - - Capitosauria
                      - Trematosauria
