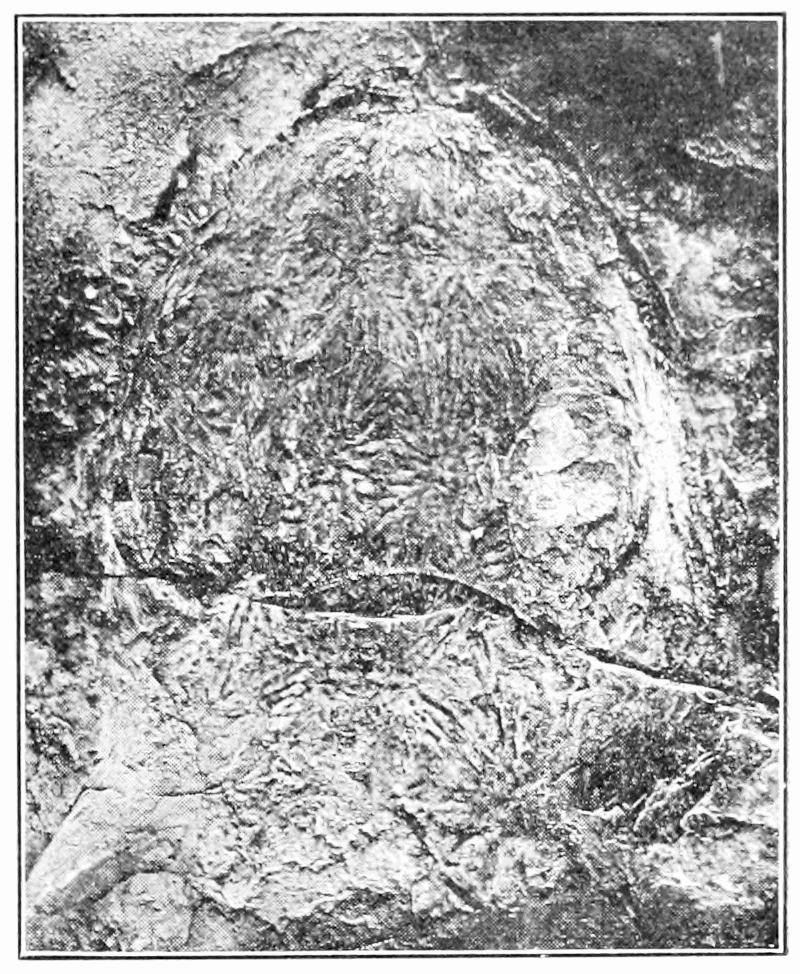
- Stegops divaricata Cope from the Carboniferous of Ohio

Scientific classification
- Kingdom: Animalia
- Phylum: Chordata
- Clade: Tetrapoda
- Order: †Temnospondyli
- Superfamily: †Dissorophoidea
- Genus: †Stegops; Cope, 1885

Type species
- †Stegops divaricata Cope, 1885

Synonyms
- Stegops newberryi (Cope, 1875 [originally Sauropleura newberryi])

= Stegops =

Stegops Temporal range: Late Carboniferous

Extinct genus of amphibians

Stegops is an extinct genus of euskelian temnospondyl from the Late Carboniferous of the eastern United States. Fossils are known from the Pennsylvanian coal deposits of Linton, Ohio. It was once classified in the eryopoid family Zatrachydidae because it and other zatrachydids have spikes extending from the margins of its skull, but it is now classified as a dissorophoid that independently evolved spikes. Stegops was first named by American paleontologist Edward Drinker Cope in 1885, with his description of the type species Stegops divaricata. Cope had also named a species of Sauropleura from Linton in 1875, which he called Sauropleura newberryi. This species was later synonymized with Stegops divaricata when the type specimen of S. newberryi was prepared and found to be a large specimen of Stegops.

== Phylogeny ==
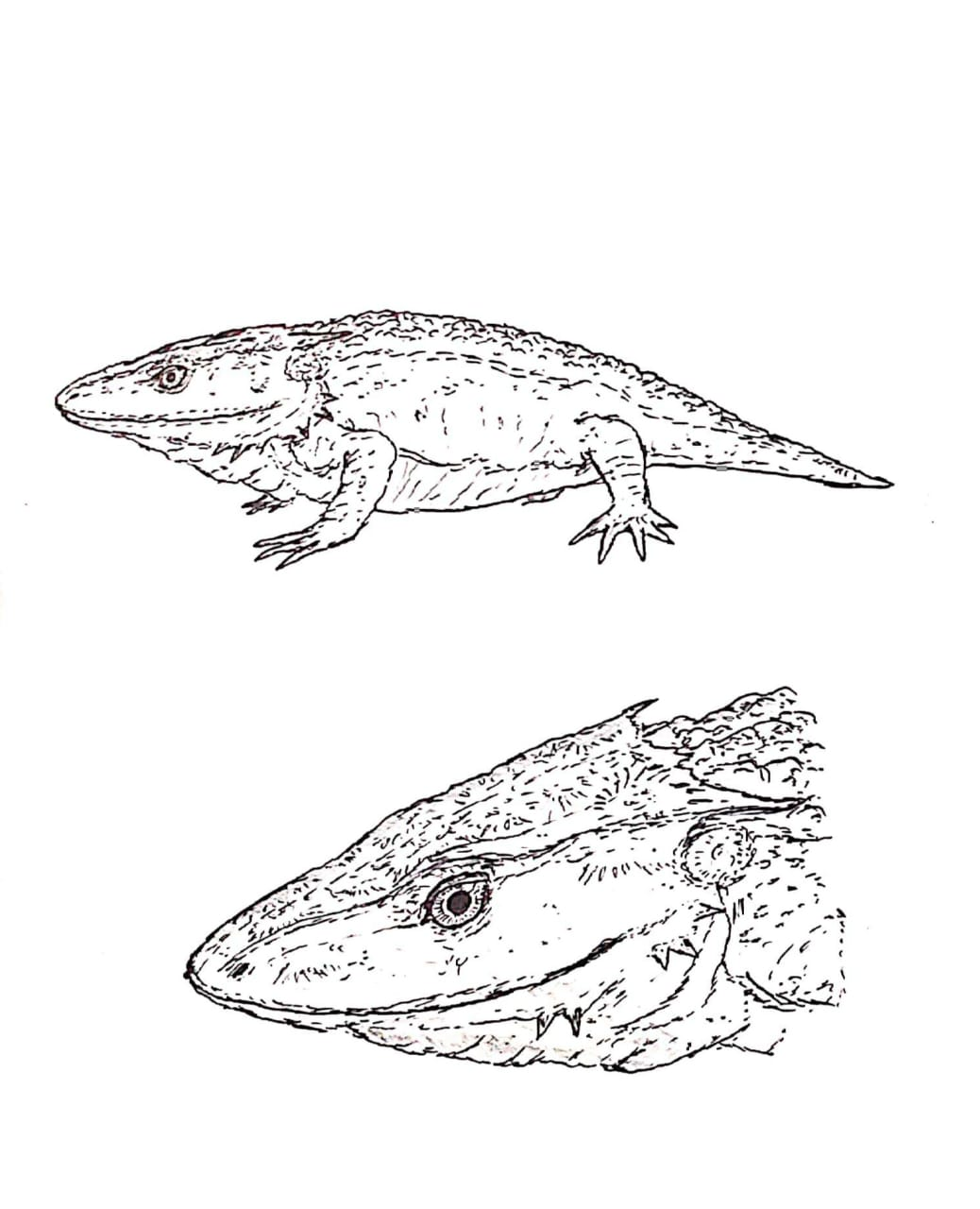
Reconstruction of Stegops divaricata based on Carroll (2009).

Stegops was included in a phylogenetic analysis in 2006. It was placed in the clade Dissorophoidea, but because it shared features with both of the two main dissorophoid groups, Amphibamidae and Olsoniformes, its exact placement within Dissorophoidea is uncertain.
