= Batrachichnus =

Batrachichnus Temporal range: Mississippian-Triassic

Trace fossil classification
- Kingdom: Animalia
- Phylum: Chordata
- Class: Amphibia
- Ichnogenus: †Batrachichnus; Woodworth 1900

Type ichnospecies
- †B. plainvillensis Woodworth 1900

Ichnospecies
- B. celer (Matthew 1903); B. jacksonensis (Butts 1891); B. plainvillensis (Woodworth 1900; type); B. obscurus (Gilmore 1927); B. salamandroides (Geinitz 1861)

Trace fossil

Batrachichnus is an amphibian ichnogenus commonly found in assemblages of ichnofossils dating to the Mississippian to Triassic of North America, South America, and Europe. The animal producing the tracks was likely a temnospondyl. B. slamandroides is the smallest known tetrapod footprint, produced by an animal with an estimated body length of just 8 millimeters (0.31 in)

== Description ==
The tracks show four toes and part or all of the palms. Pes (rear foot) prints often overstep the manus (front foot) prints. The digits were short and blunt. Toe drags are common.

Some trackways show a transition from a walking to a running gait.
