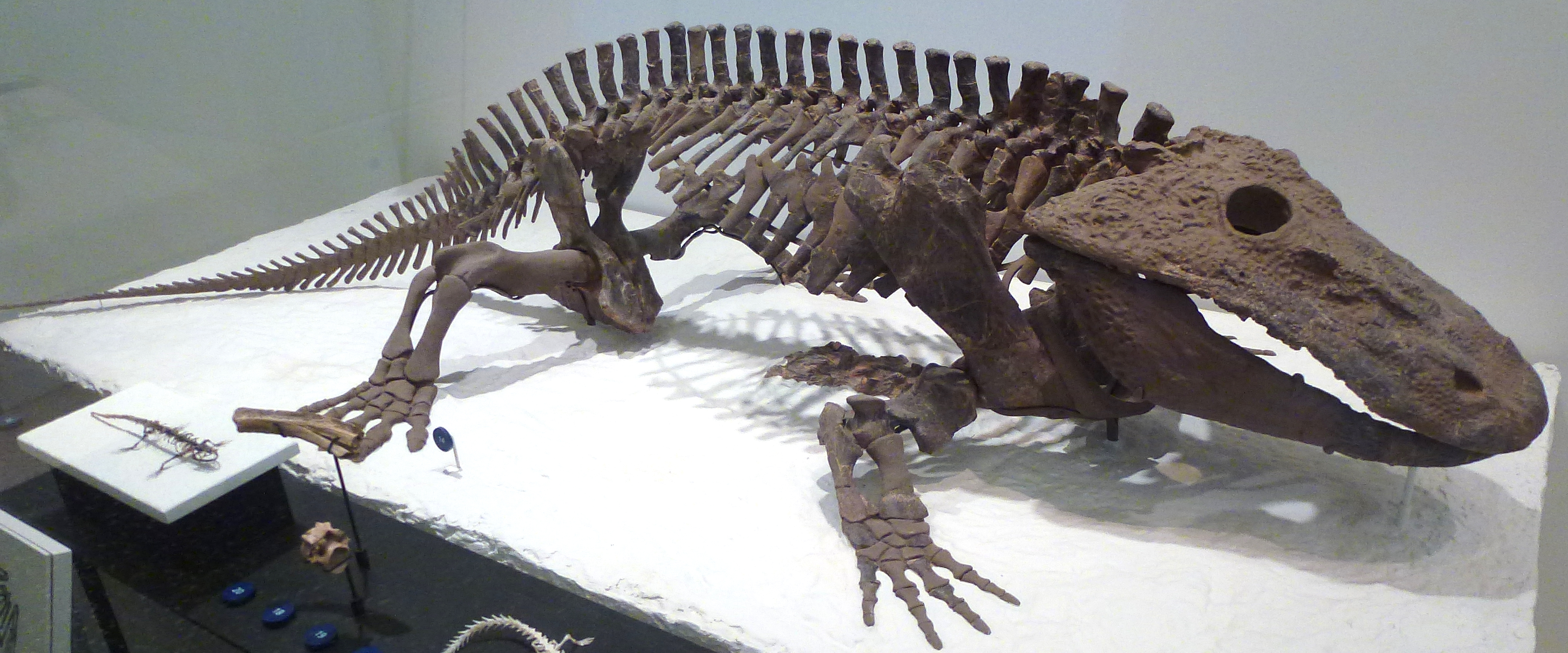
- Mounted skeleton of Eryops, American Museum of Natural History

Scientific classification
- Kingdom: Animalia
- Phylum: Chordata
- Clade: Tetrapoda
- Order: †Temnospondyli
- Suborder: †Euskelia; Yates and Warren, 2000

Superfamilies
- †Dissorophoidea?; †Eryopoidea

Synonyms
- Eryopia

= Euskelia =

Euskelia Temporal range: Pennsylvanian - Early Triassic, 307.1–249 Ma

Extinct clade of amphibians

Euskelia is a clade of extinct temnospondyl amphibians. The naming derives from the ancient Greek eu, meaning "true", and skelos, meaning "limb", in reference to well-ossified limb bones with crests to which muscles were attached. Members of this group have the most ossified skeleton of all temnospondyls.

Euskelia is a stem-based taxon including all temnospondyls more closely related to Eryops (an eryopoid) than to Parotosuchus (a stereospondyl). The clade was named by Yates & Warren (2000), whose phylogenetic analysis argued that eryopoids were more closely related to dissorophoids than to stereospondyls. Euskelia was intended to encompass the terrestrial eryopoid+dissorophoid clade, opposite to the clade Limnarchia, which included aquatic groups such as dvinosaurs and stereospondylomorphs.

Other studies propose a different structure of the temnospondyl family tree. For example, Schoch (2013) considered eryopoids to be closer to stereospondylomorphs than to dissorophoids. That study offered the name Eryopiformes for the eryopoid+stereospondylomorph clade, excluding dissorophoids.
