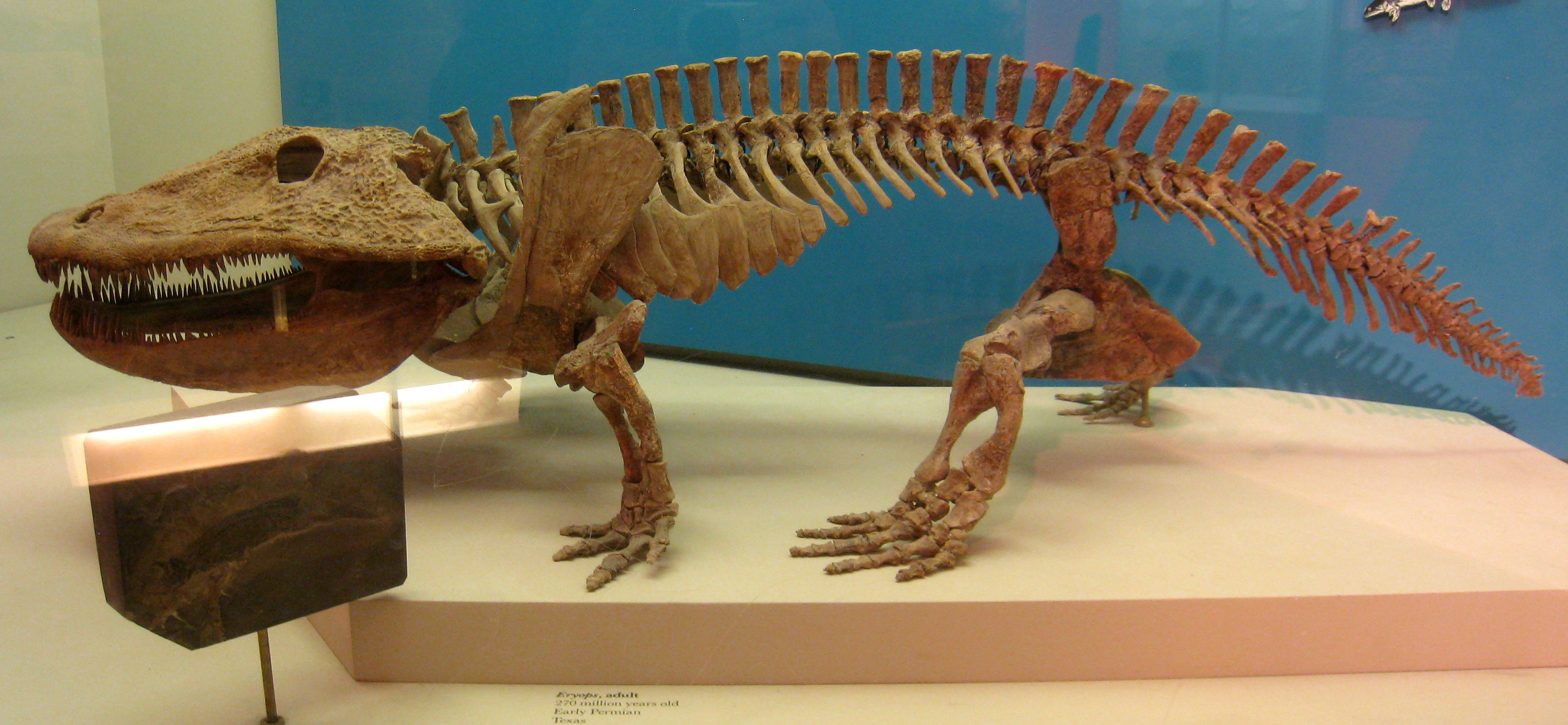
- Skeleton of Eryops megacephalus in the National Museum of Natural History, Washington, DC

Scientific classification
- Kingdom: Animalia
- Phylum: Chordata
- Clade: Stegocephali
- Clade: Tetrapoda
- Order: †Temnospondyli; Zittel, 1888

Subgroups
- See below

= Temnospondyli =

Temnospondyls Temporal range: Mississippian – Aptian, 350–120 Ma Possible descendant taxon Lissamphibia survives to present

Extinct order of tetrapods

Temnospondyli (from Greek τέμνειν, temnein 'to cut' and σπόνδυλος, spondylos 'vertebra') or temnospondyls is a diverse ancient order of small to giant tetrapods—often considered primitive amphibians—that flourished worldwide during the Carboniferous, Permian and Triassic periods, with fossils being found on every continent. A few species continued into the Jurassic and Early Cretaceous periods, but all had gone extinct by the Late Cretaceous. During about 210 million years of evolutionary history, they adapted to a wide range of habitats, including freshwater, terrestrial, and even coastal marine environments. Their life history is well understood, with fossils known from the larval stage, metamorphosis and maturity. Most temnospondyls were semiaquatic, although some were almost fully terrestrial, returning to the water only to breed. These temnospondyls were some of the first vertebrates fully adapted to life on land. Although temnospondyls are amphibians, many had characteristics such as scales and large, armour-like bony plates (osteoderms) that generally distinguish them from the modern soft-bodied lissamphibians (frogs and toads, newts, salamanders, and caecilians).

Temnospondyls have been known since the early 19th century and were initially thought to be reptiles. They were described at various times as batrachians, stegocephalians, or labyrinthodonts, although these names are now rarely used. Animals now grouped in the Temnospondyli were spread out among several amphibian groups until the early 20th century, when they were found to belong to a distinct taxon based on the structure of their vertebrae. Temnospondyli means "cut vertebrae", as each vertebra is divided into several parts (intercentrum, paired pleurocentra, neural arch), although this occurs widely among other early tetrapods.

Experts disagree over whether temnospondyls were ancestral to modern amphibians (frogs, salamanders, and caecilians), or whether the whole group died out without leaving any descendants. Different hypotheses have placed modern amphibians as the descendants of temnospondyls, as descendants of another group of early tetrapods called lepospondyls, or even as descendants of both groups (with caecilians evolving from lepospondyls and frogs and salamanders evolving from temnospondyls). Further disagreement exists about a temnospondyl origin of lissamphibians related to whether the modern groups arose from only one group (dissorophoids) or from two different groups (dissorophoids and stereospondyls). The majority of studies placed a group of temnospondyls called amphibamiforms as the closest relatives of modern amphibians. Similarities in teeth, skulls, and hearing structures link the two groups. Whether temnospondyls are considered part of the tetrapod crown or stem thus depends on their inferred relationship to lissamphibians.

== Definitions ==
=== Branch-based definition ===
In 2000, Adam Yates and Anne Warren defined the name Temnospondyli as applying to the clade encompassing all organisms that are more closely related to Eryops than to the "microsaur" Pantylus. By this definition, if lissamphibians are temnospondyls and Pantylus is a reptiliomorph, the name Temnospondyli is synonymous with Batrachomorpha (a clade containing all organisms that are more closely related to modern amphibians than to mammals and reptiles).

=== Node-based definition ===
Rainer Schoch in 2013 defined the name Temnospondyli as applying to "[t]he least inclusive clade containing Edops craigi and Mastodonsaurus giganteus".

== Description ==
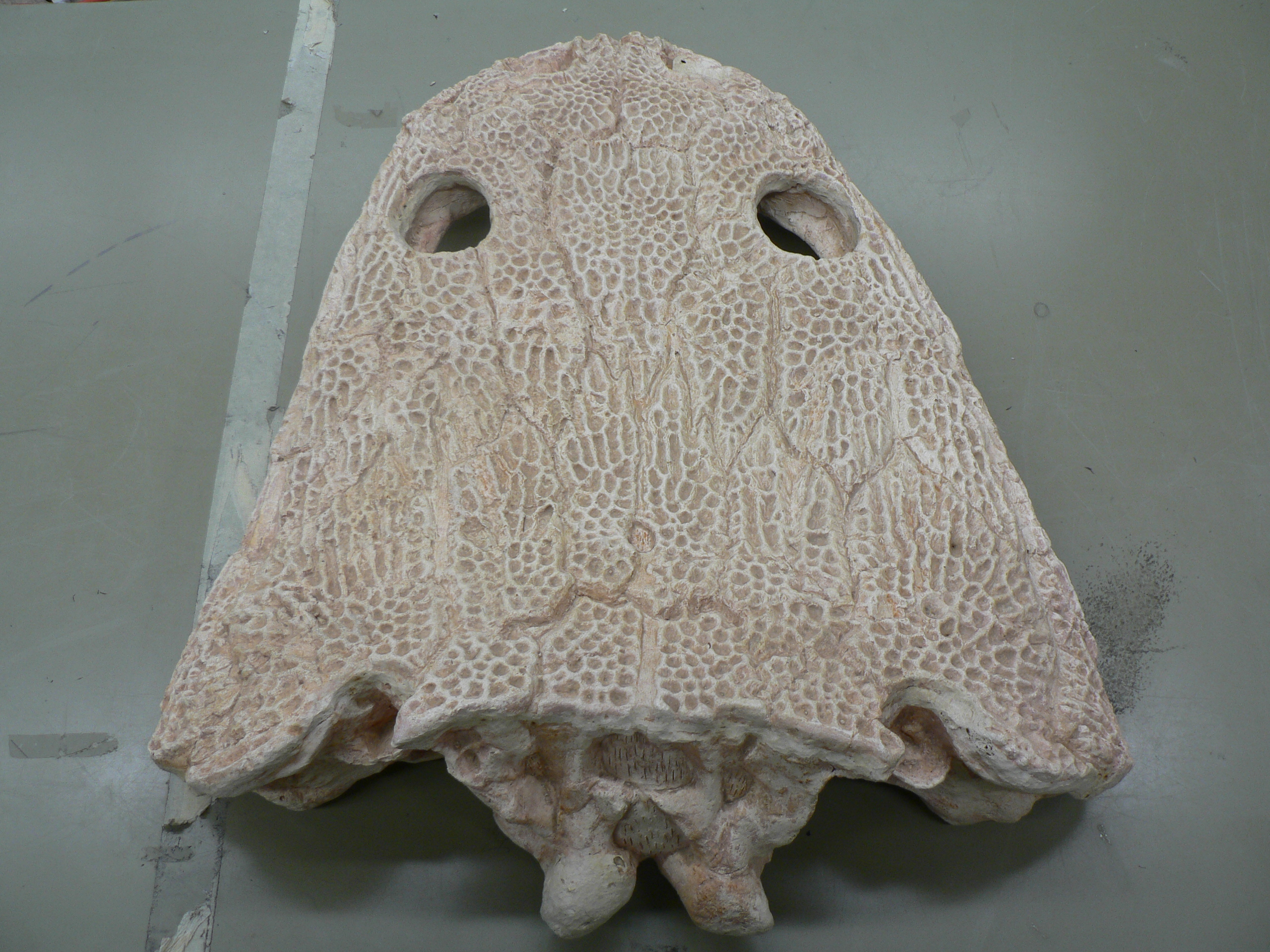
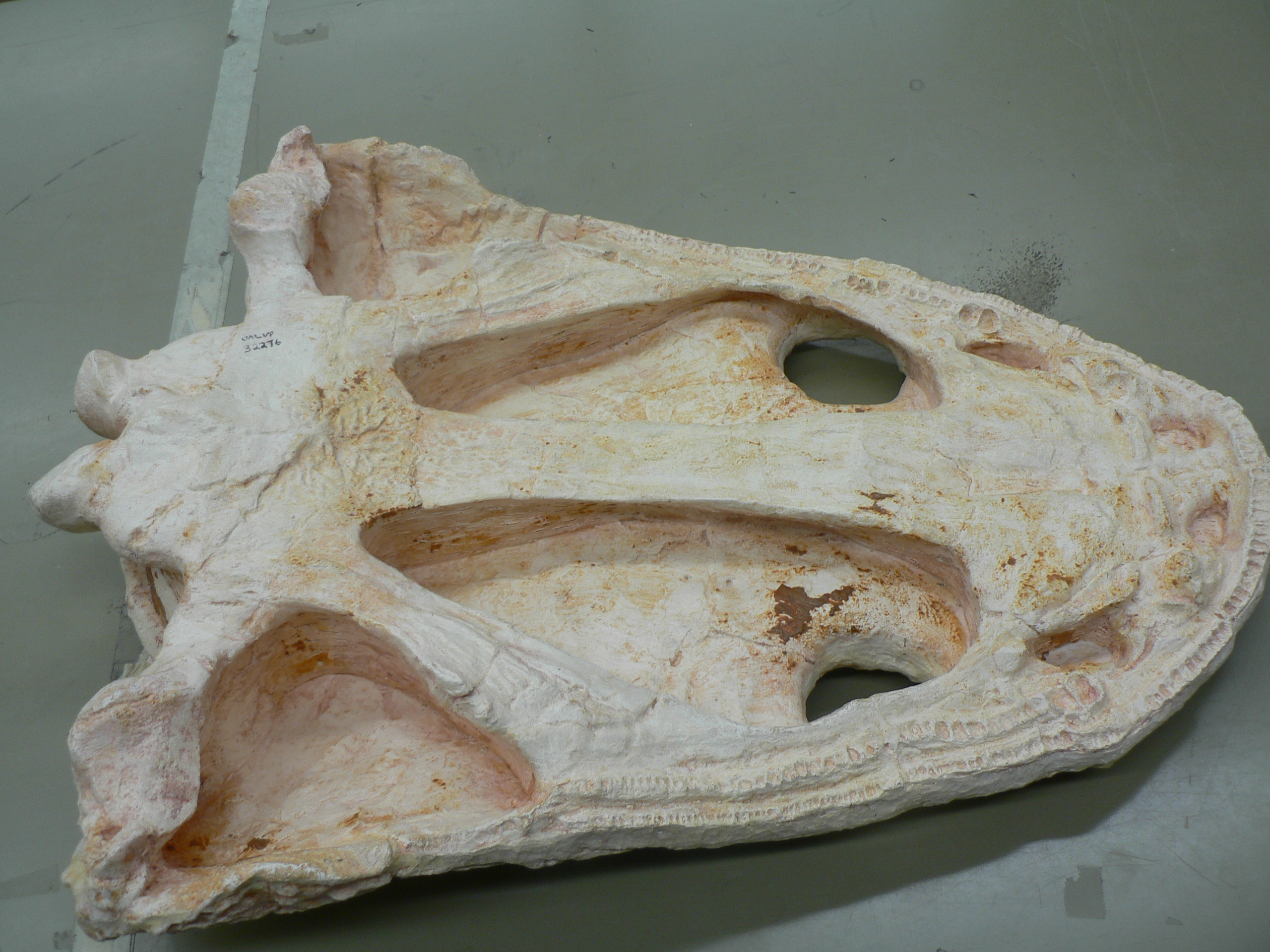
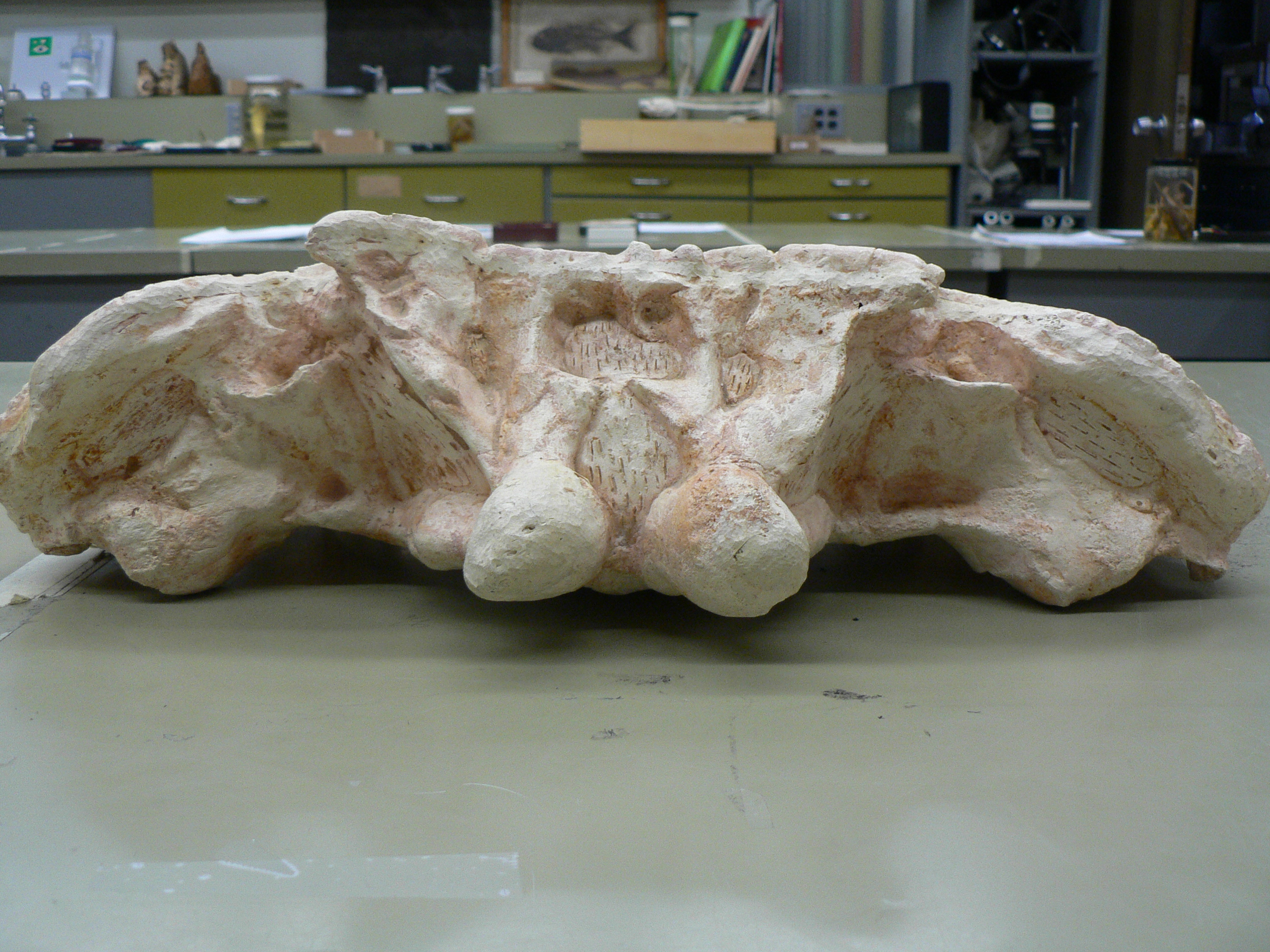
Dorsal (left), ventral (center) and posterior (right) views of the skull of Metoposaurus

Many temnospondyls are much larger than living amphibians, and superficially resemble crocodiles, which has led many taxa to be named with the suffix -suchus. The largest taxa, which were predominantly the Mesozoic stereospondyls, had skulls exceeding 1 m in length, and the entire animal would have been several meters long (for reference, the largest living amphibian, Andrias, is about 1.8 m in body length). Others are smaller and resemble salamanders, in particularly the amphibamiform and micromelerpetid dissorophoids.

=== Cranium ===
Skulls are generally parabolic to triangular in shape when viewed from above, and they were particularly flattened in semiaquatic to aquatic taxa, with dorsally facing orbits. The skull is usually covered in pits and ridges to form a honeycomb-like pattern. One of the most recent hypotheses for the function of the dermal ornamentation is that it may have supported blood vessels, which could transfer carbon dioxide to the bones to neutralize acidic build-up in the blood (early semiaquatic tetrapods would have had difficulty expelling carbon dioxide from their bodies while on land, and these dermal bones may have been an early solution to the problem). Many other possible hypotheses are given, though, for the purpose of the ornamentation (e.g., increasing surface area for better adhesion of the skin to the skull), and the function(s) remains largely unresolved due to the absence of this feature in lissamphibians. Some temnospondyls also exhibit raised tubercles or pustules instead of pits and grooves (e.g., the dissorophoid Micropholis, plagiosaurine plagiosaurids), and the import of this disparity is also unclear. Many temnospondyls also have canal-like grooves in their skulls called sensory sulci, the presence of which is used to infer an aquatically inclined lifestyle. The sulci, which usually run around the nostrils and eye sockets, are part of a lateral line system used to detect vibrations in water in modern fish and certain modern amphibians. Many taxa, especially those inferred to have been terrestrial, have an opening at the midline near the tip of the snout called the internarial fenestra / fontanelle; this may have housed a mucous gland used in prey capture. In zatracheids, this opening is greatly enlarged for an unknown purpose.

Diagram of the skull of Xenotosuchus africanus, showing the skull roof bones common in all temnospondyls

Homologues of most of the bones of temnospondyls are also seen in other early tetrapods, aside from a few bones in the skull, such as interfrontals, internasals and interparietals, that have developed in some temnospondyl taxa. The intertemporal, a bone common in stem tetrapods, is only found in some late Paleozoic taxa like certain edopoids and dvinosaurs. Most temnospondyls have an indentation at the back of the skull called otic notches. It has typically been inferred that this structure supported a typanum for hearing, although there is substantial variation among temnospondyls in the anatomy of this notch such that it may not have served this function in all temnospondyls, and some clades like plagiosaurids and brachyopids lack notches entirely.

The palate of temnospondyls generally consists of the same bones found in other early tetrapods. Among the most distinguishing features of temnospondyls are the interpterygoid vacuities, two large holes in the back of the palate. Recent studies have suggested that these large openings provided additional attachment sites for musculature and that many temnospondyls were capable of retracting their eyeballs through the vacuities, which is observed in modern frogs and salamanders that also have these large palatal openings; no evidence has been found for a buccal pump mechanism for respiration. Temnospondyls often have extensive coverings of small teeth (denticles) on their palates, as well as on the inner surface of their jaws, in contrast to modern amphibians. These denticles were homologous with teeth and possessed enamel, dentine, and a pulp cavity. Additionally, many of them have enlarged pairs of teeth on palatal elements and on the lower jaw; these teeth are so large that they are often referred to as tusks or fangs. Although most temnospondyls have monocuspid teeth, the presence of bicuspid and/or pedicellate teeth in some dissorophoids has been cited as evidence for close relatedness to lissamphibians. In some temnospondyls, such as the dvinosaur Erpetosaurus, the capitosaur Mastodonsaurus and the trematosaur Microposaurus, tusks in the lower jaw pierce the palate and emerge through openings in the top of the skull.

=== Postcranium ===
Temnospondyls' vertebrae are divided into several segments. In living tetrapods, the main body of the vertebra is a single piece of bone called the centrum, but in temnospondyls, this region was divided into a pleurocentrum and intercentrum. Two primary types of vertebrae are recognized in temnospondyls, stereospondylous and rhachitomous vertebrae. In rhachitomous vertebrae, the intercentra are large and wedge-shaped, and the pleurocentra are relatively small blocks that fit between them. Both elements support a spine-like neural arch, and well-developed interlocking projections called zygapophyses strengthen the connections between vertebrae. The strong backbone and strong limbs of many rhachitomous temnospondyls allowed them to be partially, and in some cases fully, terrestrial. In stereospondylous vertebrae, the pleurocentra have been further reduced or lost entirely, with the intercentra enlarged as the main body of the vertebrae. Early concepts of stereospondyl required the pleurocentra to be entirely absent, but newer concepts only require that the intercentrum has become greatly enlarged. This weaker type of backbone indicates that stereospondylous temnospondyls spent more time in water. Additional types that are less common are the plagiosaurid-type in which there is a single enlarged centrum of uncertain homology; and the tupilakosaurid-type vertebrae (diplospondyly) in which the pleurocentra and intercentra are the same size and form discs; this occurs in tupilakosaurid dvinosaurs but also at least some brachyopids and several other non-temnospondyls. The neural spines tend to be of similar height throughout the presacral region of the trunk, but some temnospondyls exhibit increasing height towards the mid-trunk, followed by a decrease in height to produce a more hump-backed contour. The most extreme is observed in the dissorophid Platyhystrix, which has greatly elongated neural spines that form a large sail on its back. The function of this sail, like that of the contemporaneous sphenacodontids and edaphosaurids, remains enigmatic, but it is thought to have stiffened the vertebral column in association with the relative terrestriality of this clade. Recent histological work has demonstrated that most of this hyperelongation is formed by the osteoderm capping the spine, and thus the sail of Platyhystrix is dissimilar to that of pelycosaurs in which it is entirely formed by the spine. The majority of temnospondyls have presacral counts between 23 and 27, with reduction observed in some amphibamiforms and elongation observed in many dvinosaurs. Caudal length is highly variable, and complete caudal sequences are rare. Based on Eryops, more than 30 caudal positions were possible in some taxa.

The pectoral girdle comprised an unpaired interclavicle, paired clavicles, paired cleithra and paired scapulae / scapulocoracoids as with most other early tetrapods. These elements differ widely in variation across temnospondyls, with such variation attributed to different lifestyles. The interclavicle and clavicles tend to be more lightly built in terrestrial taxa, with little to no ornamentation. In contrast, these elements are massively ossified in the aquatic stereospondyls and are well ornamented in the same fashion as the skull. The cleithrum and scapulocoracoid is more developed in terrestrial taxa, and the coracoid tends not to ossify in aquatic forms such that there is only a much shorter scapula present. The pelvis comprises the ilium, ischium and pubis, the last of which does not always ossify in aquatic forms. The sutural contacts between elements may also be visible, even when all three ossify. The forelimb comprised the typical radius, ulna, humerus and manus. These bones are typically more developed with greater surface area for muscle attachment in taxa inferred to have been terrestrial. Many dissorophoids have long and slender limbs. Historically it has been thought that all temnospondyls had only four fingers, but this has been shown not to be true in at least a few stereospondyls (Metoposaurus, Paracyclotosaurus), and the paucity of complete manuses casts doubt on the sweeping characterization of a four-fingered manus as the predominant or plesiomorphic condition. At least in Metoposauridae, there are both taxa with four fingers and taxa with five. The hindlimb comprised the typical tibia, fibula, femur and pes. Relative development is as with the forelimb. All temnospondyls with a known pes have five digits.

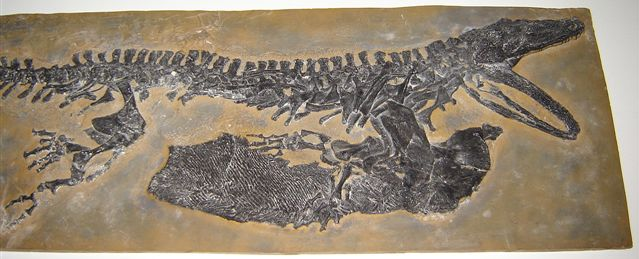
A fossil of Sclerocephalus showing a large pectoral girdle and ventral plates

Unlike modern amphibians, many temnospondyls are covered in small, closely packed scales. The undersides of most temnospondyls are covered in rows of large ventral plates. During early stages of development, they first have only small, rounded scales. Fossils show, as the animals grew, the scales on the undersides of their bodies developed into large, wide ventral plates. The plates overlap each other in a way that allows a wide range of flexibility. Later semiaquatic temnospondyls, such as trematosaurs and capitosaurs, have no evidence of scales. They may have lost scales to make movement easier under water or to allow cutaneous respiration, the absorption of oxygen through the skin.

Several groups of temnospondyls have large bony plates (osteoderms) on their backs. One temnospondyl, Peltobatrachus, has armour-like plating that covers both its back and underside. The rhytidosteid Laidleria also has extensive plating on its back. Most members of the family Dissorophidae also have armor, although it only covers the midline of the back with one or two narrow rows of plates that tightly articulated with the vertebrae, and osteoderms are also known from a few trematopids. Other temnospondyls, such as Eryops, have been found with small, disc-like bony ossifications that were in life probably embedded in the skin. All of these temnospondyls were adapted to a terrestrial lifestyle, and in dissorophids, may have provided stability for the spine. Armor may have offered protection from predators in the case of Peltobatrachus. A carapace of osteoderms is also seen in plagiosaurids, the only primarily aquatic clade with such extensive ossifications. Plagiosaurids may have inherited their armor from a terrestrial ancestor, as both Peltobatrachus and Laidleria have been considered close relatives of the group. Alternatively, these osteoderms may have served as mineral reservoirs to allow plagiosaurids to respond to a variety of environmental conditions. Contrary to older assumptions, more recent studies have argued that the temnospondyls evolved from a terrestrial ancestor (although with aquatic eggs and larvae), and that it was the forms that later returned to water and an aquatic lifestyle which evolved a spine more rigid and stiffer than the terrestrial species.

=== Soft tissue ===
Very little is known of the soft tissue of temnospondyls because the conditions necessary to preserve such material are uncommon. The most extensive records come from fine-grained deposits in the Carboniferous and Permian of Germany; the small-bodied and aquatic dissorophoids and the larger stereospondylomorphs are frequently preserved with outlines of soft tissue around the skeleton. Typically preserved features include the outline of the body, external gills and parts of the eye or stomach. An amphibamiform specimen from the Mazon Creek locality was described as having toepad-like features. The holotype specimen of Arenaerpeton supinatus from the Triassic of New South Wales, Australia, displays extensive soft tissue, hinting at the girth of the animal in life. Trace fossils attributed to temnospondyls are fairly common, especially from the Carboniferous through the Triassic. Common ichnogenera include Batrachichnus and Limnopus.

== History of study ==
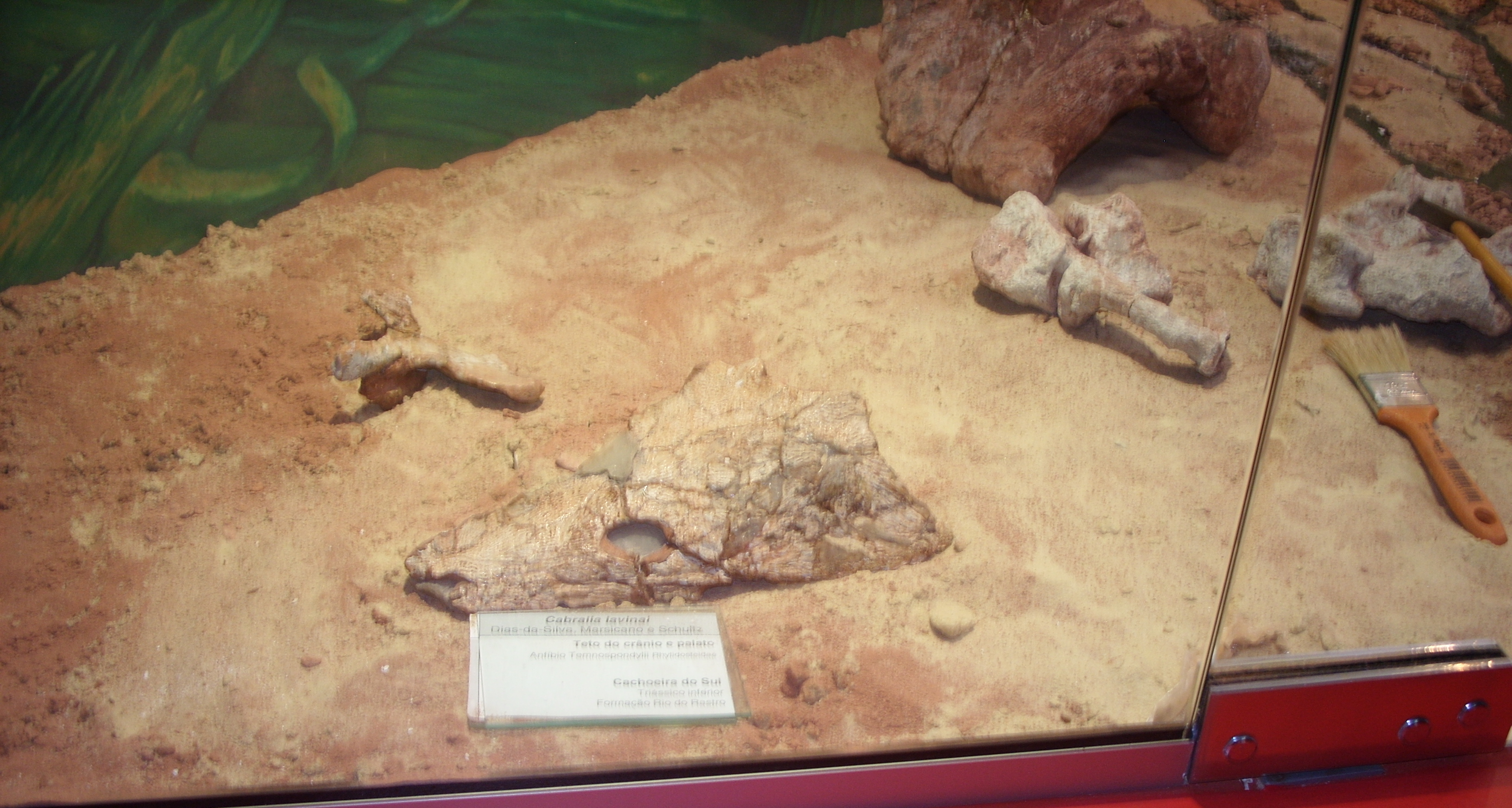
Sangaia lavinai in Paleorrota Geopark

Temnospondyli was named by the German paleontologist Karl Alfred von Zittel in his second edition of Handbuch der Palaeontologie, published in 1888. However, temnospondyl remains have been known since the early part of the 19th century.

=== Early finds: Mastodonsaurus and "labyrinthodonts" (early to mid-19th century) ===
The earliest-described temnospondyl was Mastodonsaurus, named by Georg Friedrich Jaeger in 1828 from a single tooth that he considered to belong to a reptile. Mastodonsaurus means "breast tooth lizard" after the nipple-like shape of the tip of the tooth.

The naming of these first specimens was disputed. Leopold Fitzinger named the animal Batrachosaurus in 1837. In 1841, the English paleontologist Richard Owen referred to the genus as Labyrinthodon to describe its highly folded or labyrinthine teeth. Owen thought that the name Mastodonsaurus "ought not to be retained, because it recalls unavoidably the idea of the mammalian genus Mastodon, or else a mammilloid form of the tooth... and because the second element of the word, saurus, indicates a false affinity, the remains belonging, not to the Saurian, but to the Batrachian order of Reptiles." Owen recognized that the animal was not a "saurian" reptile,^{[a]} yet he also referred Jaeger's Phytosaurus to the genus. Although the two genera have similarly sized conical teeth, Phytosaurus was later found to be a crocodile-like reptile. Additional material, including skulls, firmly placed Labyrinthodon as an amphibian. Jaeger also named Salamandroides giganteus in 1828, basing it on partial occiput, or back portion of the skull. In 1833, he described a complete skull of S. giganteus that had the same teeth as his Mastodonsaurus, making it the first-known complete skull of a temnospondyl. Because Mastodonsaurus was named first, it has precedence over the other names as a senior subjective synonym.

Mastodonsaurus and other similar animals were referred to as labyrinthodonts, named like Labyrinthodon for teeth that were highly folded in cross section. Owen's "Labyrinthodon Jaegeri" was later found at Guy's Cliffe, England by paleontologist William Buckland. Other specimens were found in the red sandstone of Warwickshire. As more fossils were uncovered in England, Owen depicted these labyrinthodonts as the "highest" form of batrachian and compared them to crocodiles, which he considered the highest form of reptiles. He also noted the large labyrinthodonts of the Keuper (a unit of rocks that dates to the Late Triassic) were younger than more advanced reptiles in the Magnesian and Zechstein, which are Late Permian in age. Owen used these fossils to counter the notion that reptiles evolved from a sequential progression from early amphibians (what he called "metamorphosed fishes").

In addition to Mastodonsaurus, some of the earliest-named genera included Metopias and Rhombopholis in 1842, Zygosaurus in 1848, Trematosaurus in 1849, Baphetes and Dendrerpeton in 1853, Capitosaurus in 1858, and Dasyceps in 1859. Baphetes is now placed as an early tetrapod outside Temnospondyli, and Rhombopholis is now considered a prolacertiform reptile.

=== Labyrinthodonts as amphibians (late 19th century) ===
Later in the 19th century, temnospondyls were classified as various members of Stegocephalia, a name coined by the American paleontologist Edward Drinker Cope in 1868. Cope placed stegocephalians in the class Batrachia, the name then used for Amphibia. Stegocephalia means "roof-headed" in Greek, a reference to the wide, flat heads of temnospondyls and other early tetrapods. During this time, paleontologists considered temnospondyls to be amphibians because they possessed three main features: gill arches in juvenile skeletons, indicating they were amphibious for at least the first part of their lives; ribs that do not connect at the underside of the rib cage; and deep pits in the skull that were interpreted as space for mucous glands.

Several suborders of stegocephalians were recognized in the late 19th and early 20th centuries. Animals now regarded as temnospondyls were primarily labyrinthodonts, but some were classified in the Branchiosauria. Branchiosaurs were small-bodied and had simple conical teeth, while labyrinthodonts were larger and had complex, folded dentin and enamel in their teeth. Branchiosauria included only a few forms, such as Branchiosaurus from Europe and Amphibamus from North America, that had poorly developed bones, external gills, and no ribs. Some skeletons of Amphibamus were later found with long ribs, prompting its reassignment to Microsauria (although more detailed studies found it to be a temnospondyl). Soft tissue, such as scales and external gills, were found in many well-preserved branchiosaur fossils from Germany. In the early 20th century, branchiosaurs would be recognized as larval forms of temnospondyls lacking many of the typical features that define the group, and is no longer recognized as a distinct group.

Other animals that would later be classified as temnospondyls were placed in a group called Ganocephala, which was characterized by plate-like skull bones, small limbs, fish-like scales and branchial arches. Unlike labyrinthodonts, they did not have parietal foramina, small holes in their skulls behind their eye sockets. Archegosaurus, Dendrerpeton, Eryops and Trimerorhachis were placed in this group and were considered to be the most primitive members of Reptilia. Their rhachitomous vertebrae, notochord and lack of occipital condyles (which attached the head to the neck) were features that were also shared with fishes. Thus, they were considered a link between early fishes and more advanced forms such as stegocephalians.

Another group was called Microsauria by Cope in 1868. He classified Microsauria as a subgroup of Labyrinthodontia, placing many small, amphibian-like animals within it. Among them was Dendrerpeton, once placed in Ganocephala. Dendrerpeton was later placed as a labyrinthodont with other temnospondyls, but confusion existed for many years over the classification of small amphibians.

By the end of the 19th century, most of what are today regarded as temnospondyls were placed in the suborder Labyrinthodonta. The American paleontologist Ermine Cowles Case called it Labyrinthodonta vera or "true labyrinthodonts". The names Stegocephalia and Labyrinthodontia were used interchangeably to refer to the order in which it belonged. The labyrinthodontian suborders Microsauria and Branchiosauria, both of which contain temnospondyls, were distinct from Labyrinthodonta. Within Labyrinthodonta were the groups Rhachitomi, Labyrinthodonti and Embolerimi. Members of Rhachitomi, such as Archegosaurus and Eryops, had rhachitomous vertebrae with enlarged intercentra that displaced the pleurocentra. Labyrinthodonti, such as Mastodonsaurus, Trematosaurus and Micropholis, had lost their pleurocentra, and the intercentra made up the entire body of the vertebrae. Embolerimi had intercentra and pleurocentra that were of equal size. Embolomeres are now identified as a separate group of reptiliomorphs or stem-group tetrapods, with no particular affinities to temnospondyls.

=== Vertebra-based classifications and the origin of the name "Temnospondyli" (1888 – 20th century) ===
In 1888, von Zittel divided stegocephalians among three taxa: Lepospondyli, Temnospondyli and Stereospondyli. He placed microsaurs in Lepospondyli, a group which he characterized as having simple, spool-shaped vertebral centra. Temnospondyli included forms with the centra divided into pleurocentra and intercentra. All members of Stereospondyli had amphicoelous centra composed only of the intercentra. Cope objected to von Zittel's classification, considering the vertebrae of lepospondyls and stereospondyls indistinguishable because each had a simple spool shape. He continued to use Ganocephala and Labyrinthodonta (which he alternatively referred to as Rhachitomi) to distinguish animals based on the absence or presence of occipital condyles.

Temnospondyli became a commonly used name at the turn of the 20th century. Paleontologists included both embolomeres and rhachitomes in the group. Cope's Ganocephala and Labyrinthodonta fell out of use. In 1919, British paleontologist D. M. S. Watson proposed that the evolutionary history of these large amphibians could be seen through changes in their vertebrae. Embolomerous forms in the Carboniferous graded into rhachitomous forms in the Permian, and finally into stereospondyls in the Triassic. More importantly, Watson began using the term Labyrinthodontia to refer to these groups. The name Temnospondyli was rarely used in the decades that followed. Swedish paleontologist Gunnar Säve-Söderbergh removed embolomeres from the group, narrowing its scope to rhachitomes and stereospondyls. His classification of labyrinthodonts was based heavily on characteristics of the skull rather than the vertebrae.

The American paleontologist Alfred Romer brought the name Temnospondyli back into use in the later 20th century. Säve-Söderbergh used the name Labyrinthodontia in a strict sense (sensu stricto) to refer to Rhachitomi and Stereospondyli, excluding Embolomeri. Romer agreed with this classification, but used the name Temnospondyli to avoid confusion with Labyrinthodontia in its wider sense (sensu lato). Unlike modern temnospondyl classification, however, Romer included the primitive Ichthyostegalia in the group.

=== 20th century – present ===
More recent study of temnospondyls has largely focused on their paleobiology and resolving their internal relationships. With a few exceptions, the monophyly of Temnospondyli is not questioned, and the disuse of terms like Labyrinthodontia and Stegocephalia continues. The contemporary definition of the clade excludes many groups that were once placed within Temnospondyli or that temnospondyls were once placed in a presumed monophyletic clade with, such as Colosteidae, Embolomeri and Microsauria. Temnospondyls continue to be heavily involved in the debate over lissamphibian origins.

As with evolutionary biology in general, computer-assisted phylogenetic methods have greatly facilitated phylogenetic inference of the relationships of both Temnospondyli at large and specific sub-groups. Other quantitative analyses have addressed morphometrics and biomechanics.

Temnospondyls were also documented from an increasingly broad geographic and stratigraphic range in the 20th and 21st centuries, including the first occurrences from historically undersampled regions such as Antarctica, Lesotho, Japan, Namibia, New Zealand, Niger, and Turkey.

== Evolutionary history ==
=== Carboniferous and Early Permian (Cisuralian) ===
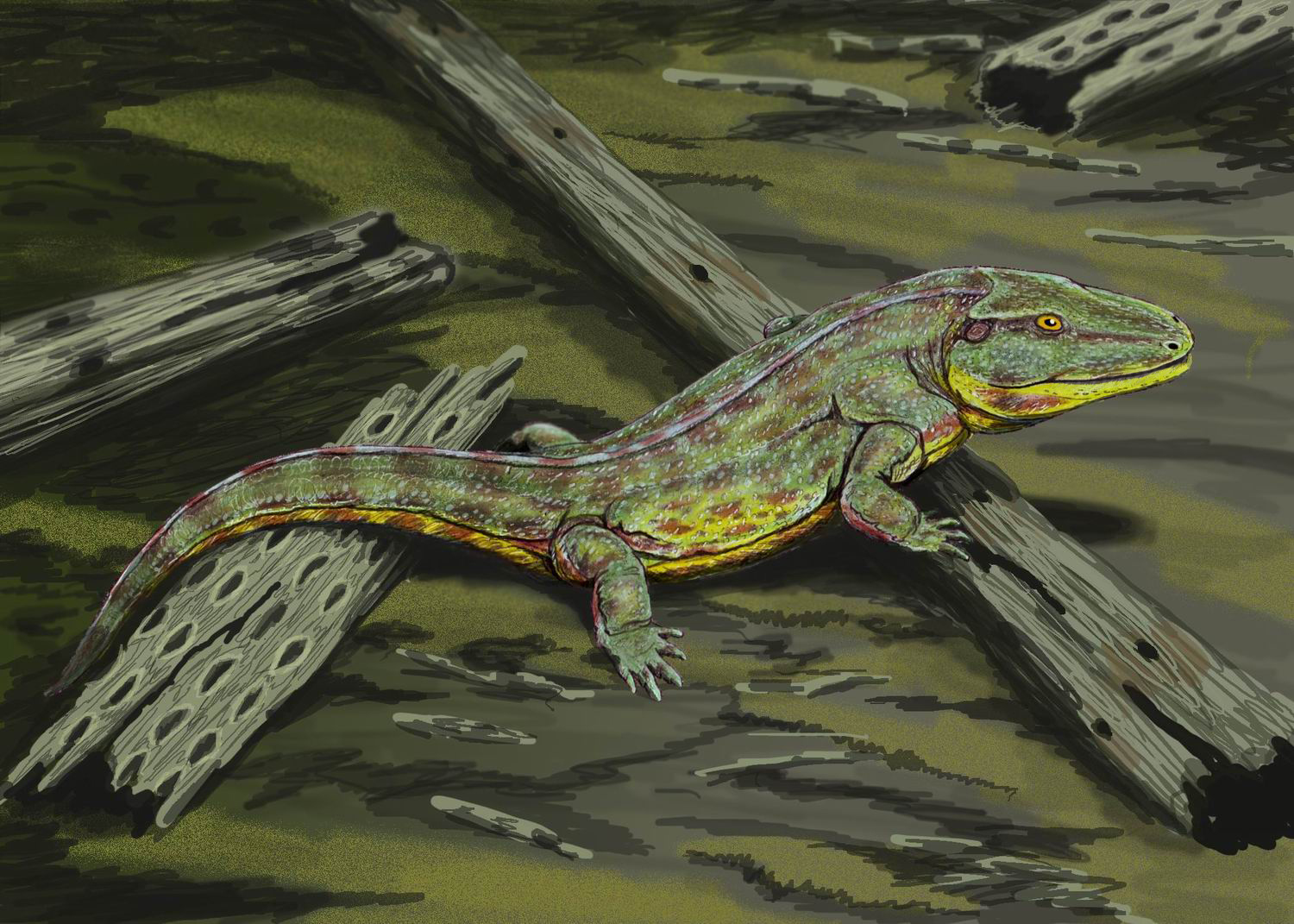
Capetus, a basal temnospondyl.

The earliest fossil evidence of temnospondyls are fossil footprints assigned to the ichnotaxa Batrachichnus and Paleosauropus from the Tournaisian stage of the Early Carboniferous, about 350 million years ago (Ma). The first body fossils of temnospondyls appeared in the Middle Mississippian (Viséan), around 330 million years ago (Mya), where the earliest appearances are Balanerpeton from Scotland and an indeterminate temnospondyl from Germany. During the Carboniferous, all of the non-stereospondylomorph clades appeared, including dendrerpetids, edopoids, eryopoids, the various dissorophoid subclades, dvinosaurs and zatracheids. Stereospondylomorphs and stereospondyls first appeared in the early Permian, although the former may have appeared earlier and merely be undocumented at present. The vast majority of the Carboniferous records come from the midwestern United States, such as the Linton, Five Points and Mazon Creek lagerstätte, and the south-central United States where classic redbed formations are found; and from western Europe, particularly the Saar-Nahe Basin in Germany and Nýřany in Czechia. The early Permian record of temnospondyls is also concentrated in these regions. Most of the clades from the Late Carboniferous continued to be successful, with a particularly high diversity of dissorophoids.

=== Middle Permian (Guadalupian) ===
Middle Permian records of temnospondyls are relatively sparse, and some of these are debated as a result of the uncertain age and correlation of different deposits in North America (Chickasha, Flowerpot Formations), Niger (Moradi Formation), Brazil (Rio do Rasto Formation) and Russia (Mezen complex) and the subsequent controversy over Olson's Gap, but there is a general consensus that at least some of these records are Guadalupian in age. Records of rhinesuchids from the Eodicynodon andTapinocephalus Assemblage Zones of South Africa are less controversial. Additional records are known from Brazil, China, Turkey, and the Isheevo complex of Russia. A mixture of taxa are represented, including stereospondylomorphs (Konzhukovia) and rhinesuchid stereospondyls, as well as some of the latest occurrences of dissorophoids (Anakamacops, Kamacops).

=== Late Permian (Lopingian) ===
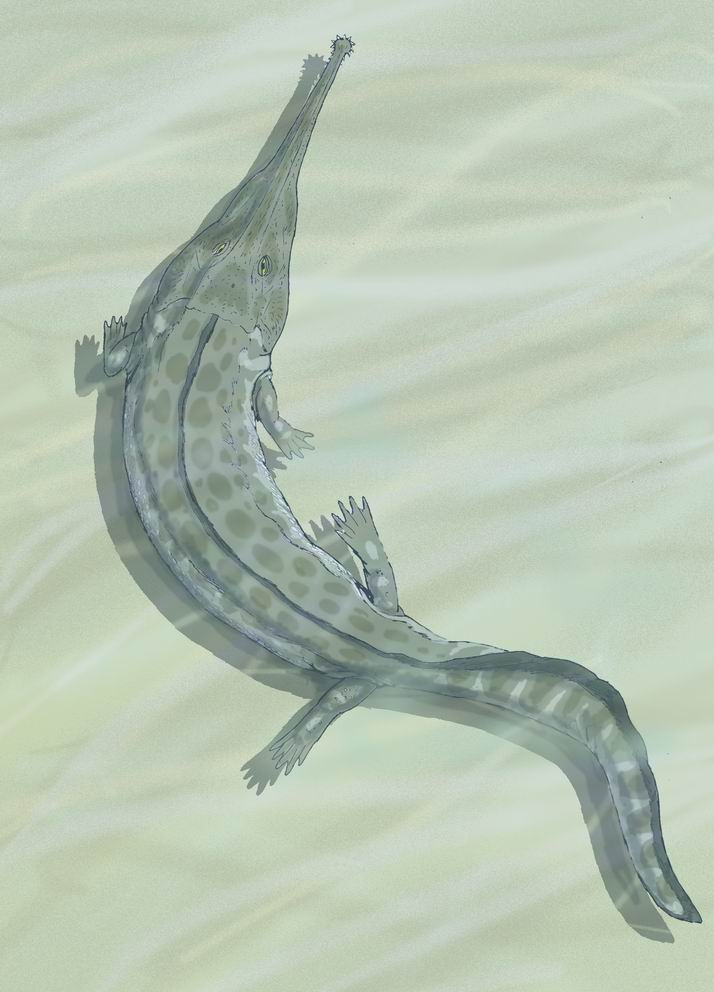
Prionosuchus, from the Permian, the largest non-amniote tetrapod ever described

During the Late Permian, increasing aridity and the diversification of reptiles contributed to a decline in terrestrial temnospondyls, but semiaquatic and fully aquatic stereospondylomorph temnospondyls continued to flourish, including the large Melosaurus of Eastern Europe. Despite this temnospondyls continued to flourish and diversify in the Late Permian, a major group called Stereospondyli became more dependent on life in the water. The vertebrae became weak, the limbs small, and the skull large and flat, with the eyes facing upwards. Temnospondyls were more widespread in the Southern Hemisphere compared to the Northern Hemisphere during the Late Permian. Other temnospondyls, such as archegosaurids, developed long snouts and a close similarity to crocodiles, although they lacked the armor characteristic of the latter group. These temnospondyls included the largest-known non-amniote tetrapod, the over 5.5-meter-long Prionosuchus of Brazil. The stereospondyl record is almost exclusively confined to rhinesuchids.

=== Early Triassic ===
Following the Permian–Triassic extinction, temnospondyls, mainly stereospondyls, diversified to again reach a global distribution. Early Triassic temnospondyls are best known from relatively high paleolatitudes like Australia, Greenland, India, Madagascar, Russia and South Africa; comparatively few records are found in regions like North America and western Europe. Several non-stereospondyls such as the dissorophoid Micropholis and some tupilakosaurid dvinosaurs are considered relictual holdovers but went extinct after the Early Triassic. Most major stereospondyl clades appeared during the Early Triassic, including capitosaurs, chigutisaurids, plagiosaurids and trematosaurs; there is some uncertainty about the exact age of records of rhytidosteids and brachyopids around the P–T boundary. Several of these clades, like lapillopsids, lydekkerinids and rhytidosteids went extinct after the Early Triassic, in addition to the rhinesuchids. Some of these clades reached several meters in body length (like the capitosaurs and trematosaurs) while others were mere centimeters (like the lapillopsids and lydekkerinids). Stereospondyls thus reached their greatest taxonomic diversity and morphology diversity during the Early Triassic. During this time, one group of longirostrine (long-snouted) piscivorous temnospondyls, the trematosauroids, frequently adapted to a life in the sea, the only known non-amniote tetrapods to do so with the exception of the modern crab-eating frog. Longirostrine temnospondyls became progressively less common in the Mesozoic, appearing briefly in the Early Triassic before going extinct during the Anisian stage of the Middle Triassic, with their disappearance coinciding with the archosauromorphs such as proterochampsids and phytosaurs, which may have played a role in their extinction. Another group, the capitosauroids, included medium-sized and large animals 2.3 to 4 m (7.5 to 13.1 ft) in length, with large and flat skulls that could be over a meter long in the largest forms such as the Middle Triassic Mastodonsaurus. Another group of stereospondyls, the plagiosaurs, had wide heads and gills, and adapted to life at the bottom of lakes and rivers. These animals spent most or all their lives in water as aquatic predators, catching their prey by a sudden opening of the upper jaw and sucking in fish or other small animals.

=== Middle Triassic ===
The Middle Triassic was dominated by the larger-bodied stereospondyls, primarily the capitosaurs, which attained some of the largest body sizes known among non-amniotes. Particularly rich records are found in western Europe, which has been suggested as one location for diversification of the clade. Brachyopids, trematosauroids and plagiosaurids were more uncommon but are still commonly recovered in some localities; brachyopids are mainly found in the southern hemisphere and plagiosaurids mainly in the northern hemisphere.

=== Late Triassic ===
In the Late Triassic, metoposaurids, a group of trematosaurs, appeared and became relatively globally distributed. Metoposaurids are distinguished from most other stereospondyls by the positioning of their eye sockets near the front of their skulls. Large assemblages of metoposaurids with dozens to hundreds of individuals preserved together have been found in the southwestern United States, Morocco, India and western Europe. They have often been interpreted as mass death events caused by droughts in floodplain environments. Recent studies show these dense assemblages were instead probably the result of currents transporting and accumulating dead individuals in certain areas. In contrast, non-metoposaurid trematosaurs were relatively rare during this time. Capitosaurs and plagiosaurids remained common throughout the northern hemisphere in particular. Chigutisaurids, which first appeared in the Early Triassic, are absent in the Middle Triassic but reappear in the Late Triassic of the southern hemisphere. Although previous workers suggested that many stereospondyl clades known to go extinct after the Late Triassic went extinct well before the actual end of the Triassic (capitosaurs, metoposaurids, plagiosaurids), recent findings suggest that this may be the product of sampling bias.

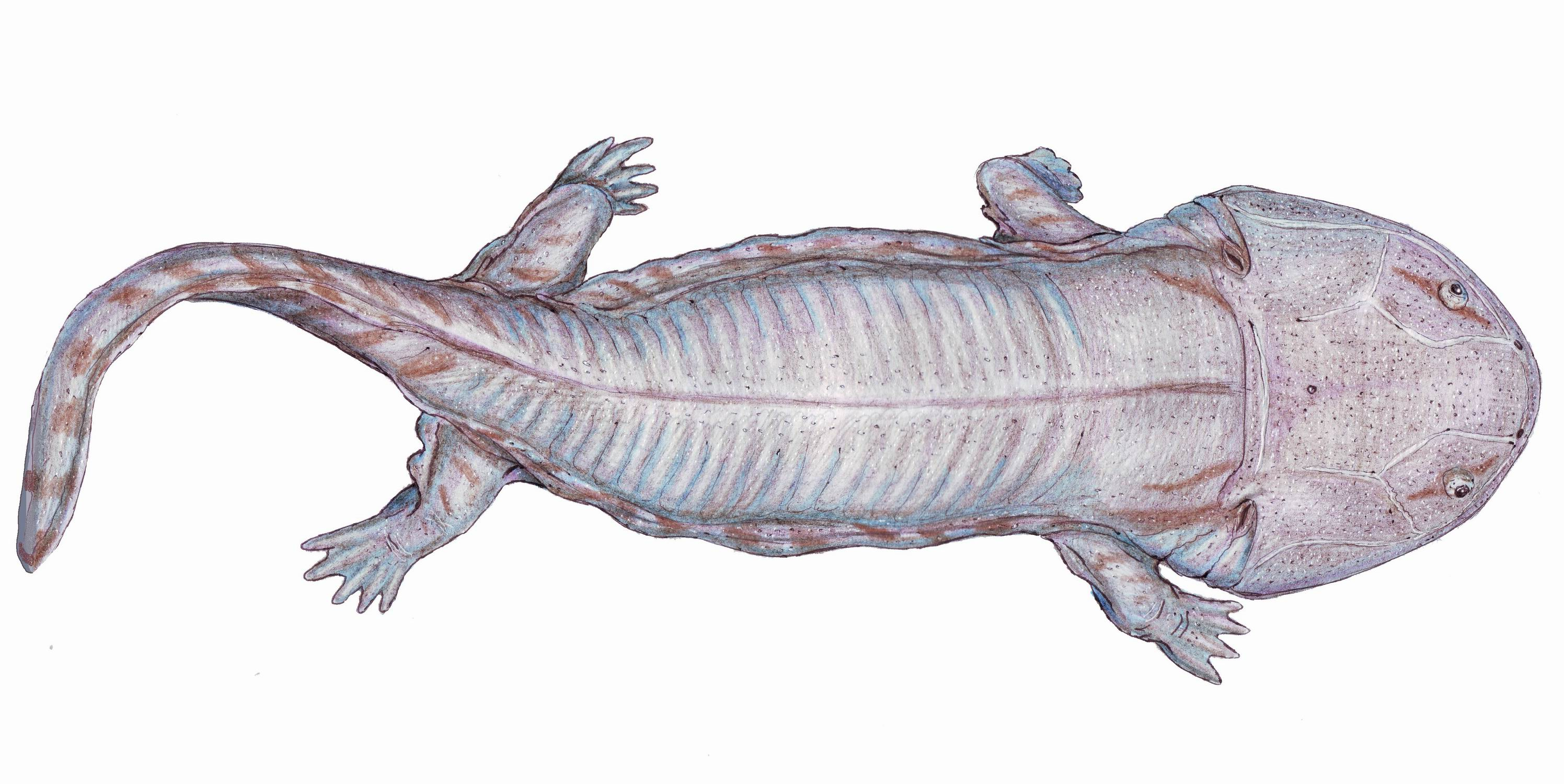
Siderops, a Jurassic temnospondyl

=== Jurassic and Cretaceous ===
Temnospondyls reached a peak diversity during the Early Triassic, and progressively declined throughout the subsequent Middle and Late Triassic, with only members of the Brachyopoidea and Trematosauroidea surviving into the Jurassic and the Cretaceous. Among brachyopoids, the brachyopids Gobiops and Sinobrachyops are known from Middle and late Jurassic deposits across Asia and the chigutisaurid Siderops is known from the Early Jurassic of Australia. The most recent known temnospondyl is the chigutisaurid Koolasuchus, known from the Early Cretaceous (Aptian) of Australia. It is thought to have survived in polar rift valleys that were too cold in the winter for crocodylomorphs that normally would have competed with them. Koolasuchus was one of the largest of the brachyopoids, with an estimated weight of 500 kg (1,100 lb).

== Classification ==
Originally, temnospondyls were classified according to the structure of their vertebrae. Early forms, with complex vertebrae consisting of a number of separate elements, were placed in the suborder Rachitomi, and large Triassic aquatic forms with simpler vertebrae were placed in the suborder Stereospondyli. With the recent growth of phylogenetics, this classification is no longer viable. The basic rhachitomous condition is found in many primitive tetrapods, and is not unique to one group of temnospondyls. Moreover, the distinction between rhachitomous and stereospondylous vertebrae is not entirely clear. Some temnospondyls have rhachitomous, semirhachitomous and sterospondylous vertebrae at different points in the same vertebral column. Other taxa have intermediate morphologies that do not fit into any category. Rachitomi is no longer recognized as an exclusive group (i.e. it includes Stereospondyli rather than being a counterpart to it), but Stereospondyli is still considered valid. Below is a simplified taxonomy of temnospondyls showing currently recognized groups:

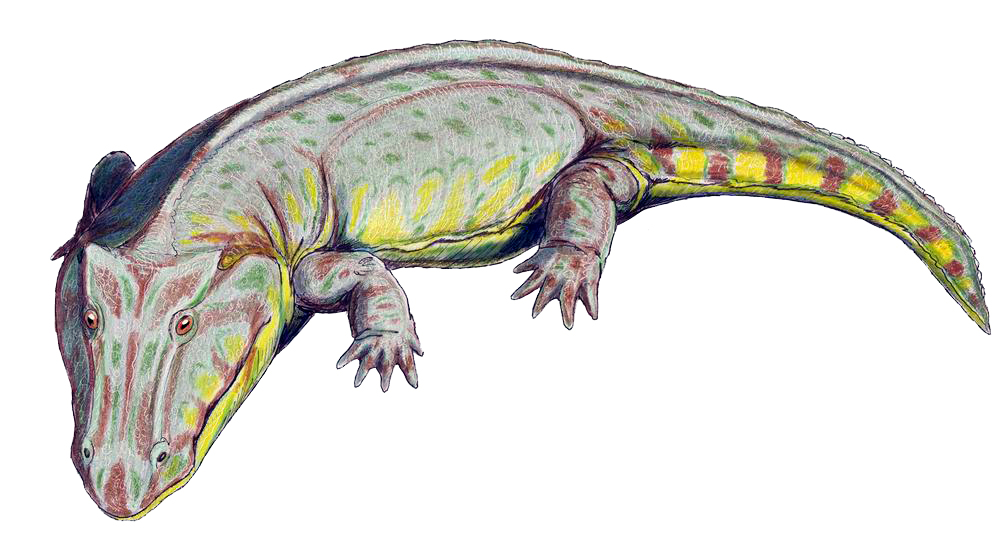
Edops, a basal edopoid

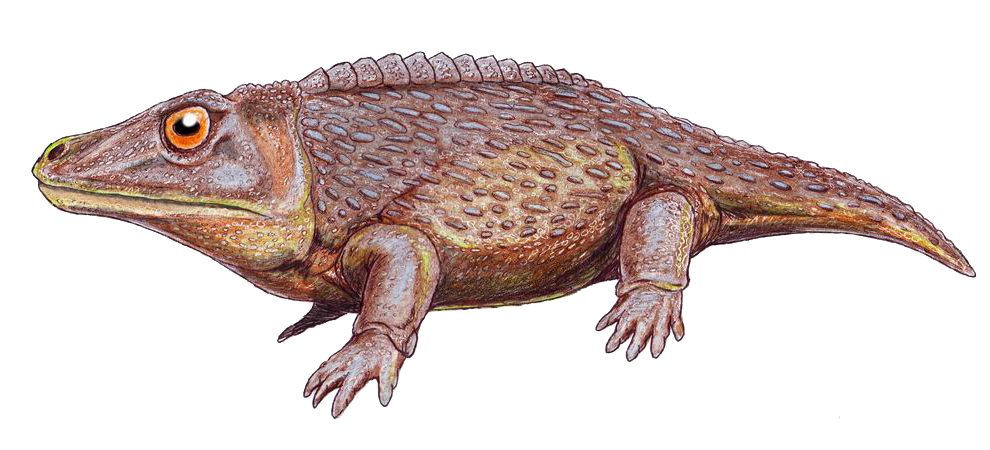
Zygosaurus, a dissorophid dissorophoid

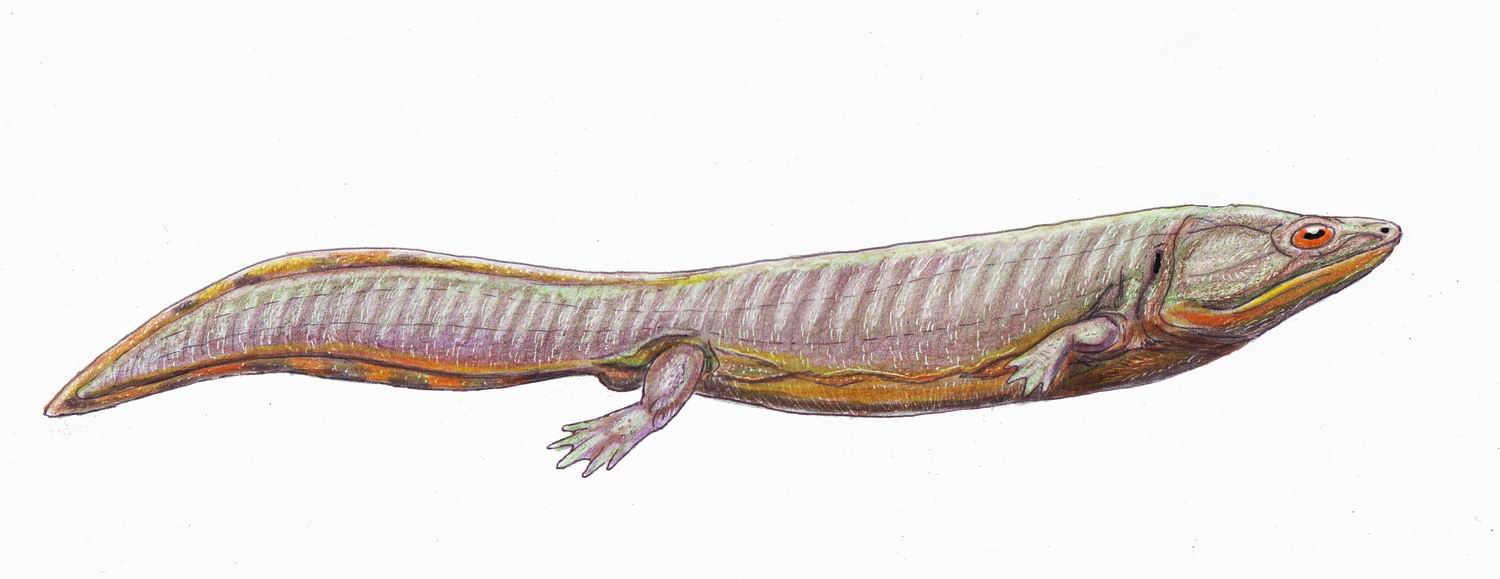
Dvinosaurus, a dvinosaurian

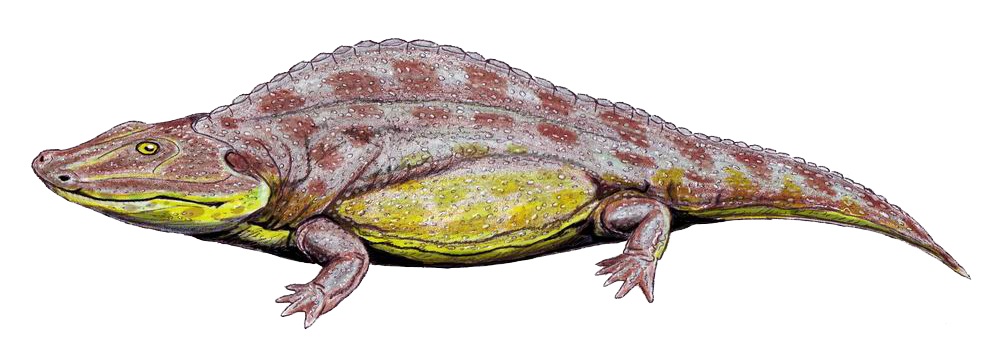
Sclerothorax, a temospondyl of uncertain affinities; possibly a sterospondyl closely related to Capitosauria

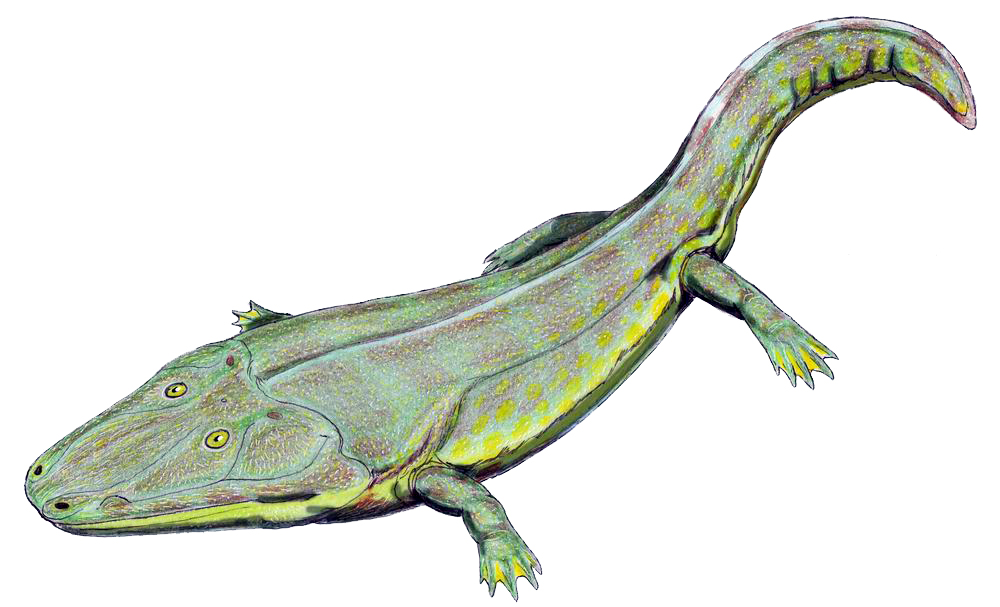
Cyclotosaurus, a capitosaurian stereospondyl

Class Amphibia

- Order Temnospondyli
  - Superfamily Edopoidea
    - Family Cochleosauridae
    - Family Edopidae
  - Clade Eutemnospondyli
    - Family Dendrerpetidae
    - Clade Rhachitomi
      - Suborder Dvinosauria
        - Family Trimerorhachidae
        - Superfamily Dvinosauroidea
          - Family Dvinosauridae
          - Family Eobrachyopidae
          - Family Tupilakosauridae
      - Superfamily Dissorophoidea
        - Family Micromelerpetontidae
        - Clade Xerodromes
          - Clade Amphibamiformes
            - Family Amphibamidae
            - Family Branchiosauridae
              - Subfamily Branchiosaurinae
            - Family Micropholidae
            - Subclass Lissamphibia? (placement is uncertain)
          - Clade Olsoniformes
            - Family Dissorophidae
              - Subfamily Dissorophinae
              - Subfamily Eucacopinae
            - Family Trematopidae
      - Family Zatracheidae
      - Clade Eryopiformes
        - Suborder Euskelia
          - Superfamily Dissorophoidea?
          - Superfamily Eryopoidea
            - Family Eryopidae
            - Family Zatracheidae?
        - Clade Limnarchia
          - Suborder Dvinosauria?
          - Clade Stereospondylomorpha
            - Superfamily Archegosauroidea
              - Family Archegosauridae
                - Subfamily Melosaurinae
                - Subfamily Platyoposaurinae
              - Family Intasuchidae?
              - Family Sclerocephalidae
            - Suborder Stereospondyli
              - Family Peltobatrachidae
              - Family Lapillopsidae?
              - Family Rhinesuchidae
                - Clade Superstes
                  - Family Lydekkerinidae
                  - Clade Neostereospondyli
                    - Clade Capitosauria
                      - Family Sclerothoracidae
                      - Superfamily Mastodonsauroidea
                        - Family Heylerosauridae
                        - Family Mastodonsauridae
                        - Family Stenotosauridae
                    - Clade Trematosauria
                      - Superfamily Trematosauroidea
                        - Family Thoosuchidae
                        - Family Trematosauridae
                          - Subfamily Tertreminae
                          - Subfamily Lonchorhynchinae
                          - Subfamily Trematosaurinae
                      - Superfamily Metoposauroidea
                        - Family Latiscopidae
                        - Family Metoposauridae
                      - Superfamily Plagiosauroidea
                        - Family Laidleriidae?
                        - Family Plagiosauridae
                      - Superfamily Rhytidosteoidea
                        - Family Indobrachyopidae?
                        - Family Rhytidosteidae
                          - Subfamily Derwentiinae
                      - Clade Brachyopomorpha
                        - Superfamily Brachyopoidea
                          - Family Brachyopidae
                          - Family Chigutisauridae

=== Phylogeny ===
In one of the earliest phylogenetic analyses of the group, Gardiner (1983) recognized five characteristics that made Temnospondyli a clade: a bone at the back of the skull, the parasphenoid, is connected to another bone on the underside of the skull, the pterygoid; large openings called interpterygoid vacuities are present between the pterygoids; the stapes (a bone involved in hearing) is connected to the parasphenoid and projects upward; the cleithrum, a bone in the pectoral girdle, is thin; and part of the vertebra called the interdorsal attaches to the neural arch. Additional features were given by Godfrey et al. (1987), including the contact between the postparietal and exoccipital at the back of the skull, small projections (uncinate processes) on the ribs, and a pelvic girdle with each side having a single iliac blade. These shared derived characteristics are called synapomorphies.

Temnospondyls are placed as basal tetrapods in phylogenetic analyses, with their exact positioning varying between studies. Depending on the classification of modern amphibians, they are either included in the crown group Tetrapoda or the stem of Tetrapoda. Crown-group tetrapods are descendants of the most recent common ancestor of all living tetrapods and stem tetrapods are forms that are outside the crown group. Modern amphibians have recently been suggested as descendants of temnospondyls, which would place them within crown Tetrapoda. Below is a cladogram from Ruta et al. (2003) placing Temnospondyli within crown Tetrapoda:

- Tetrapodomorpha
  - Acanthostega
  - - Ichthyostega
    - - Tulerpeton
      - - Colosteidae
        - - Crassigyrinus
          - - Whatcheeriidae
            - - Baphetidae
              - Crown Tetrapoda
                - - Eucritta
                  - - Temnospondyli
                    - Lissamphibia
                - - Caerorhachis
                  - - - Eoherpeton
                      - Embolomeri
                    - - Gephyrostegidae
                      - - Solenodonsaurus
                        - - Seymouriamorpha
                          - - - Diadectomorpha
                              - Amniota
                            - - Westlothiana
                              - Lepospondyli

Other studies place modern amphibians as the descendants of lepospondyls and place temnospondyls in a more basal position within the stem of Tetrapoda. Below is a cladogram from Laurin and Reisz (1999) placing Temnospondyli outside crown Tetrapoda:

- Tetrapoda
  - - Acanthostega
    - Ichthyostega
  - - Tulerpeton
    - - - Crassigyrinus
        - Baphetidae
      - - Colosteidae
        - - Temnospondyli
          - - - Gephyrostegidae
              - Embolomeri
            - - Seymouriamorpha
              - - Westlothiana
                - Crown Tetrapoda
                  - Lepospondyli
                    - - Adelospondyli
                      - Aïstopoda
                    - - Nectridea
                      - - Tuditanomorpha
                        - - Brachystelechidae
                          - - Lysorophidae
                            - Lissamphibia
                  - - Solenodonsaurus
                    - - Diadectomorpha
                      - Amniota

Most phylogenetic analyses of temnospondyl interrelationships focus on individual families. One of the first broad-scale studies of temnospondyl phylogeny was conducted by paleontologist Andrew Milner in 1990. A 2007 study made a "supertree" of all temnospondyl families, combining the family-level trees of previous studies. The following cladogram is modified from Ruta et al. (2007):

- 1
  - 2
    - Edops
    - Cochleosauridae
  - - Dendrerpetontidae
    - - 3
        - Trimerorhachis
        - - Neldasaurus
          - - Dvinosaurus
            - - Eobrachyopidae
              - - Brachyops
                - Tupilakosauridae
      - - Capetus
        - - Saharastega
          - - Iberospondylus
            - - Palatinerpeton
              - - 4
                  - 5
                    - Parioxyidae
                    - Eryopidae
                  - - Zatracheidae
                    - 6
                      - Trematopidae
                      - - Dissorophidae
                        - - Amphibamidae
                          - - Stegops
                            - - Eimerisaurus
                              - Branchiosauridae
                - 7–14

- 7
  - Lysipterygium
  - - 8
      - Actinodontidae
      - - Intasuchidae
        - - Melosauridae
          - Archegosauridae
    - 9
      - - Plagiosauridae
        - Peltobatrachidae
      - - Lapillopsidae
        - - Rhinesuchidae
          - - 10
              - Lydekkerinidae
              - - Indobrachyopidae
                - - Rhytidosteidae
                  - 11
                    - Brachyopidae
                    - Chigutisauridae
            - - 12
                - Mastodonsauroidea
              - 13
                - Benthosuchus
                - - Thoosuchidae
                  - - 14
                      - Almasauridae
                      - Metoposauridae
                    - Trematosauridae

1 Temnospondyli, 2 Edopoidea, 3 Dvinosauria, 4 Euskelia, 5 Eryopoidea, 6 Dissorophoidea, 7 Limnarchia, 8 Archegosauroidea, 9 Stereospondyli, 10 Rhytidostea, 11 Brachyopoidea, 12 Capitosauria, 13 Trematosauria, 14 Metoposauroidea

The most basal group of temnospondyls is the superfamily Edopoidea. Edopoids have several primitive or plesiomorphic features, including a single occipital condyle and a bone called the intertemporal that is absent in other temnospondyls. Edopoids include the Late Carboniferous genus Edops and the family Cochleosauridae. Dendrerpetontidae has also been included in Edopoidea, and is the oldest-known temnospondyl family. Balanerpeton woodi is the oldest species, having been present over 330 million years ago during the Viséan stage of the Early Carboniferous. Recent analyses place Dendrerpetontidae outside Edopoidea in a more derived position. Other primitive temnospondyls include Capetus and Iberospondylus. Saharastega and Nigerpeton, both described in 2005 from Niger, are also primitive yet come from the Late Permian. They are almost 40 million years younger than other basal temnospondyls, implying a long ghost lineage of species that are not yet known in the fossil record.

In 2000, paleontologists Adam Yates and Anne Warren produced a revised phylogeny of more derived temnospondyls, naming several new clades. Two major clades were Euskelia and Limnarchia. Euskelia includes the temnospondyls that were once called rhachitomes and includes two subfamilies, the Dissorophoidea and the Eryopoidea. Dissorophoids include small, mostly terrestrial temnospondyls that may be the ancestors of modern amphibians. Eryopoids include larger temnospondyls like Eryops. The second major clade, Limnarchia, includes most Mesozoic temnospondyls, as well as some Permian groups. Within Limnarchia are the superfamily Archegosauroidea and the most derived temnospondyls, the stereospondyls.

Yates and Warren also named Dvinosauria, a clade of small aquatic temnospondyls from the Carboniferous, Permian and Triassic. They placed Dvinosauria within Limnarchia, but more recent studies disagree on their position. For example, a 2007 study places them even more basal than euskelians, while a 2008 study keeps them as basal limnarchians.

Within Stereospondyli, Yates and Warren erected two major clades: Capitosauria and Trematosauria. Capitosaurs include large semiaquatic temnospondyls like Mastodonsaurus with flat heads and eyes near the back of the skull. Trematosaurs include a diversity of temnospondyls, including large marine trematosaurids, aquatic plagiosaurs, brachyopoids that survived into the Cretaceous, and metoposauroids with eyes near the front of their heads. In 2000, paleontologists Rainer Schoch and Andrew Milner named a third major clade of stereospondyls, the Rhytidostea. This group included more primitive stereospondyls that could not be placed in either Capitosauria or Trematosauria, and included groups like Lydekkerinidae, Rhytidosteidae and Brachyopoidea. While Capitosauria and Trematosauria are still widely used, Rhytidostea is not often supported as a true clade in recent analyses. Rhytidosteids and brachyopoids are now grouped with trematosaurians, but lydekkerinids are still considered to be a primitive family of stereospondyls.

A new phylogeny of temnospondyls was offered by paleontologist Rainer Schoch in 2013. It supported many of the clades that were found by Yates and Warren, but it did not find support for their division of derived stereospondyls into Euskelia and Limnarchia. Eryopids were found to be more closely related to stereospondyls than to dissorophoids, which were grouped with dvinosaurs. The clade including Eryopidae and Stereospondylomorpha was named Eryopiformes. In addition, Schoch named the clade containing all temnospondyls except edopoids Eutemnospondyli and reinstated the name Rhachitomi for the clade containing all temnospondyls except edopoids and dendrerpetontids. Below is the cladogram from Schoch's analysis:

- Temnospondyli
  - Edopoidea
  - Eutemnospondyli
    - "Dendrerpetontidae"
    - Rhachitomi
      - - Dvinosauria
        - - Zatracheidae
          - Dissorophoidea
      - Eryopiformes
        - Eryopidae
        - Stereospondylomorpha
          - Sclerocephalus
          - - Glanochthon
            - - Archegosaurus
              - - Australerpeton
                - Stereospondyli
                  - Rhinesuchidae
                  - - Lydekkerina
                    - - Capitosauria
                        - Edingerella
                        - - Benthosuchus
                          - - Wetlugasaurus
                            - - Watsonisuchus
                              - Capitosauroidea
                      - Trematosauria
                        - Brachyopoidea + Plagiosauridae
                        - Trematosauroidea
                          - - Lyrocephaliscus
                            - Peltostega
                          - Trematosauridae
                          - Metoposauridae

=== Relationship to modern amphibians ===
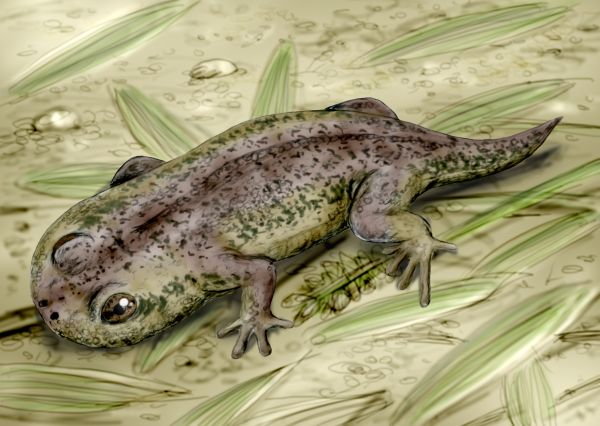
Life restoration of the dissorophoid Gerobatrachus, a close relative of lissamphibians

Modern amphibians (frogs, salamanders and caecilians) are classified in Lissamphibia. Lissamphibians appear to have arisen in the Permian. Molecular clock estimates place the first lissamphibian in the Late Carboniferous, but the first member of Batrachia (frogs and salamanders, but not caecilians) is estimated to have appeared in the Middle Permian using the same technique.

Using fossil evidence, there are three main theories for the origin of modern amphibians. One is that they evolved from dissorophoid temnospondyls. Another is that they evolved from lepospondyls, most likely the lysorophians. A third hypothesis is that caecilians descended from lepospondyls and frogs and salamanders evolved from dissorophoids.

Recently, the theory that temnospondyls were the ancestors of all lissamphibians has gained wide support. The skull morphology of some small temnospondyls has been compared to those of modern frogs and salamanders, but the presence of bicuspid, pedicellate teeth in small, paedomorphic or immature temnospondyls has been cited as the most convincing argument in favor of the temnospondyl origin of lissamphibians. Seen in lissamphibians and many dissorophoid temnospondyls, pedicellate teeth have calcified tips and bases. During the development of most tetrapods, teeth begin to calcify at their tips. Calcification normally proceeds downward to the base of the tooth, but calcification from the tip stops abruptly in pedicellate teeth. Calcification resumes at the base, leaving an area in the center of the tooth uncalcified. This pattern is apparent in both living amphibians and certain dissorophoid fossils.

The dissorophoid clade Amphibamiformes is thought to be most closely related to Lissamphibia. In 2008, an amphibamiform called Gerobatrachus hottoni was named from Texas and was nicknamed the "frogamander" for its frog-like head and salamander-like body. It was thought to be the most closely related temnospondyl to lissamphibians and was placed as the sister taxon of the group in a phylogenetic analysis. An amphibamiform species called Doleserpeton annectens was the first member of this group to be suggested to be closely related to lissamphibians. Unlike Gerobatrachus, Doleserpeton was known since 1969, and the presence of pedicellate teeth in its jaws has led some paleontologists to conclude soon after its naming that it was a relative of modern amphibians. It was first described as a "protolissamphibian", and the specific name annectens means "connecting" in reference to its inferred transitional position between temnospondyls and lissamphibians. The structure of its tympanum, a disk-like membrane that functions like an ear drum, is similar to that of frogs and has also been used as evidence for a close relationship.

Below is a cladogram from Schoch & Werneburg (2023) showing the current phylogeny of Dissorophoidea with lissamphibians as a branch:

- Temnospondyli
  - Trimerorhachis
  - - Sclerocephalus
    - - Acanthostomatops
      - - Perryella
        - Dissorophoidea
          - Micromelerpetidae
            - Micromelerpeton
            - - Branchierpeton
              - Eimerisaurus
              - Limnogyrinus
          - Xerodromes
            - Olsoniformes
              - Actiobates
              - - Palodromeus
                - - Mattauschia
                  - Mordex
              - - - Dissorophidae
                    - Dissorophinae
                    - Eucacopinae
                  - Ecolsonia
                  - Fedexia
                  - - Tambachia
                    - - Acheloma
                      - Phonerpeton
            - Amphibamiformes
              - Micropholidae
                - Eoscopus
                - - Tersomius
                  - - Micropholis
                    - Pasawioops
              - - Branchiosauridae
                  - Branchiosaurus
                  - Xerodromeus
                  - Apateon
                  - - Melanerpeton
                    - - Leptorophus
                      - Schoenfelderpeton
                - Amphibamidae
                  - Platyrhinops
                  - - Amphibamus
                    - Doleserpeton
                - - Gerobatrachus
                  - Georgenthalia
                  - Lissamphibia

Chinlestegophis, a putative Triassic stereospondyl considered to be related to metoposauroids such as Rileymillerus, has been noted to share many features with caecilians, a living group of legless burrowing amphibians. If Chinlestegophis is indeed both an advanced stereospondyl and a relative of caecilians, this means that although all lissamphibians are descended from temnospondyls, the different groups would have descended from different branches of the temnospondyl family tree. This would represent a fourth hypothesis, sometimes termed the 'diphyly hypothesis.' Anurans and urodelans would therefore be surviving dissorophoids while apodans (caecilians) are surviving stereospondyls. However, this hypothesis has been refuted by other studies on both methodological and conceptual grounds without any additional support.

== Paleobiology ==
=== Metabolism and gas exchange ===
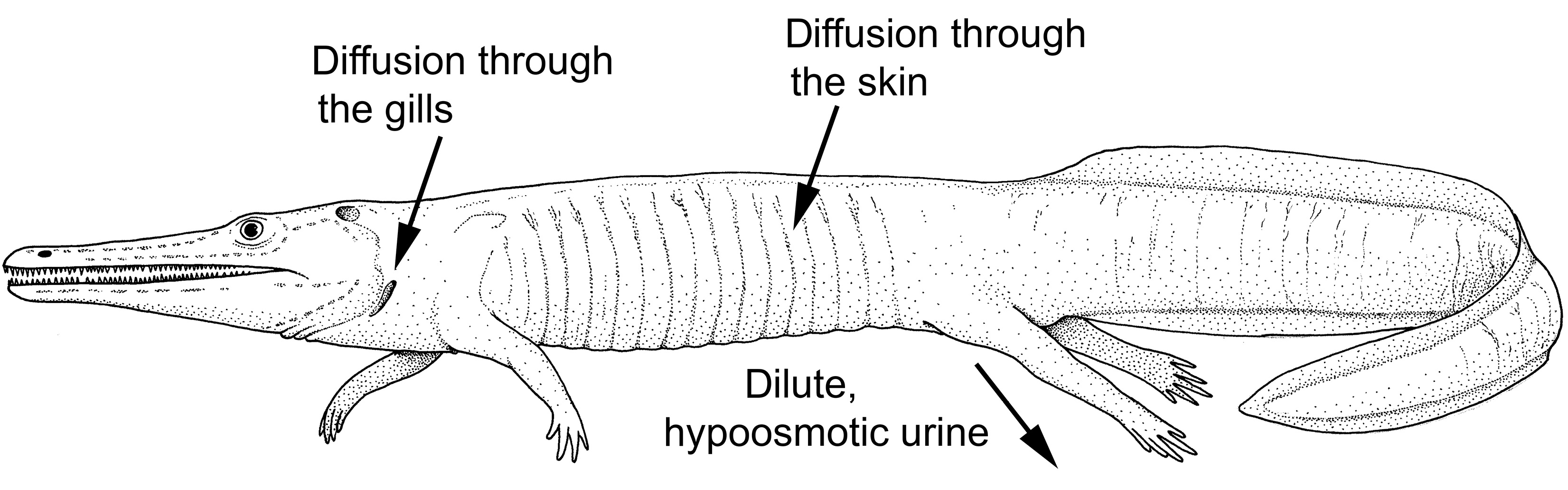
Water balance in Archegosaurus

A study on the fully aquatic Archegosaurus shows that its heat balance, gas exchange, osmoregulation, and digestion were more similar to those of fish than those of modern aquatic amphibians like salamanders.

=== Feeding ===
Although the earliest temnospondyls were primarily semiaquatic, they had the ability to feed on land. Later, eryopoids and dissorophoids, some well adapted to terrestrial life, also fed on land. Some eryopoids became better adapted toward life in water and shifted their diets toward aquatic organisms. The first primarily aquatic feeders were archegosaurs in the Permian. Trematosaurs and capitosaurs became independently aquatic and also returned to this type of feeding.

Most aquatic stereospondyls have flattened heads. When feeding, they probably opened their mouths by lifting their skulls instead of lowering their lower jaws. The jaw mechanics of the plagiosaurid Gerrothorax is well known, and is one of the most highly adapted. Gerrothorax is thought to have lifted its skull to around 50 degrees above horizontal through the flexing of the atlanto-occipital joint between the occipital condyles of the skull and the atlas vertebra of the neck. As the skull is raised, the quadrate bone pushes forward and causes the lower jaw to protrude outward. Other stereospondyls probably also lifted their skulls, but they are not as well adapted for such movement. D.M.S. Watson was the first to suggest skull lifting as a means of feeding in temnospondyls. He envisioned that Mastodonsaurus, a much larger temnospondyl than Gerrothorax, was able to make the same movement. Paleontologist A.L. Panchen also supported the idea in 1959, suggesting that Batrachosuchus also fed in this way. At the time it was thought that these temnospondyls lifted their heads with strong jaw muscles, but it is now thought that they used larger muscles in the neck that were attached to the large pectoral girdle. Plagiosuchus, a close relative of Gerrothorax, also has a hyobranchial skeleton that muscles may have attached to. Plagiosuchus has very small teeth and a large area for muscle attachment behind the skull, suggesting that it could suction feed by rapidly opening its mouth.

Unlike semiaquatic temnospondyls, terrestrial temnospondyls have skulls that are adapted for biting land-living prey. The sutures between the bones of the skull in the dissorophoid Phonerpeton are able to withstand a high degree of compression. Compressive forces would have been experienced when biting down on prey. Earlier aquatic tetrapods and tetrapod ancestors differ from temnospondyls like Phonerpeton in that their skulls were also built to withstand tension. This tension would have been experienced during suction feeding underwater. Temnospondyls like Phonerpeton were among the first tetrapods that were almost exclusively terrestrial and fed by biting.

=== Reproduction ===
Temnospondyls, like most modern amphibians, reproduced in aquatic environments. Most temnospondyls probably reproduced through external fertilization. Like most living frogs, female temnospondyls would have laid masses of eggs in water while males released sperm to fertilize them. Several fossils were described from the Early Permian of Texas in 1998 that may be egg masses of dissorophoid temnospondyls. They were the first-known fossils of amphibian eggs. The fossils consist of small disks with thin membranes that are probably vitelline membranes and halo-like areas surrounding them that are most likely mucous coatings. They are attached to plant fossils, suggesting that these temnospondyls laid eggs on aquatic plants much like modern frogs. The mucous membranes show that the eggs were laid by amphibians, not fish (their eggs lack mucous), but the type of amphibian that laid them cannot be known because no body fossils are preserved with the eggs. The eggs are thought to be from dissorophoids because they are likely to be close relatives of modern amphibians, and probably had similar reproductive strategies. They are also the most common amphibians from the deposit in which the eggs were found.

One temnospondyl, the dvinosaur Trimerorhachis, may have brooded young in an area between the gills called the pharyngeal pouch. Small bones belonging to younger Trimerorhachis individuals have been found in these pouches. The living Darwin's Frog is also a mouth brooder and would be the closest modern analogue to Trimerorhachis if it cared for its young in this way. An alternative possibility is that Trimerorhachis was cannibalistic, eating its young like many amphibians do today. If this was the case, the bones of these smaller individuals were originally located in the throat and were pushed into the pharyngeal pouch as the animal fossilized.

Body impressions of Early Carboniferous temnospondyls from Pennsylvania suggest that some terrestrial temnospondyls mated on land like some modern amphibians. They reproduced through internal fertilization rather than mating in water. The presence of three individuals in one block of sandstone shows that the temnospondyls were gregarious. The head of one individual rests under the tail of another in what may be a courtship display. Internal fertilization and similar courtship behavior are seen in modern salamanders.

=== Growth ===
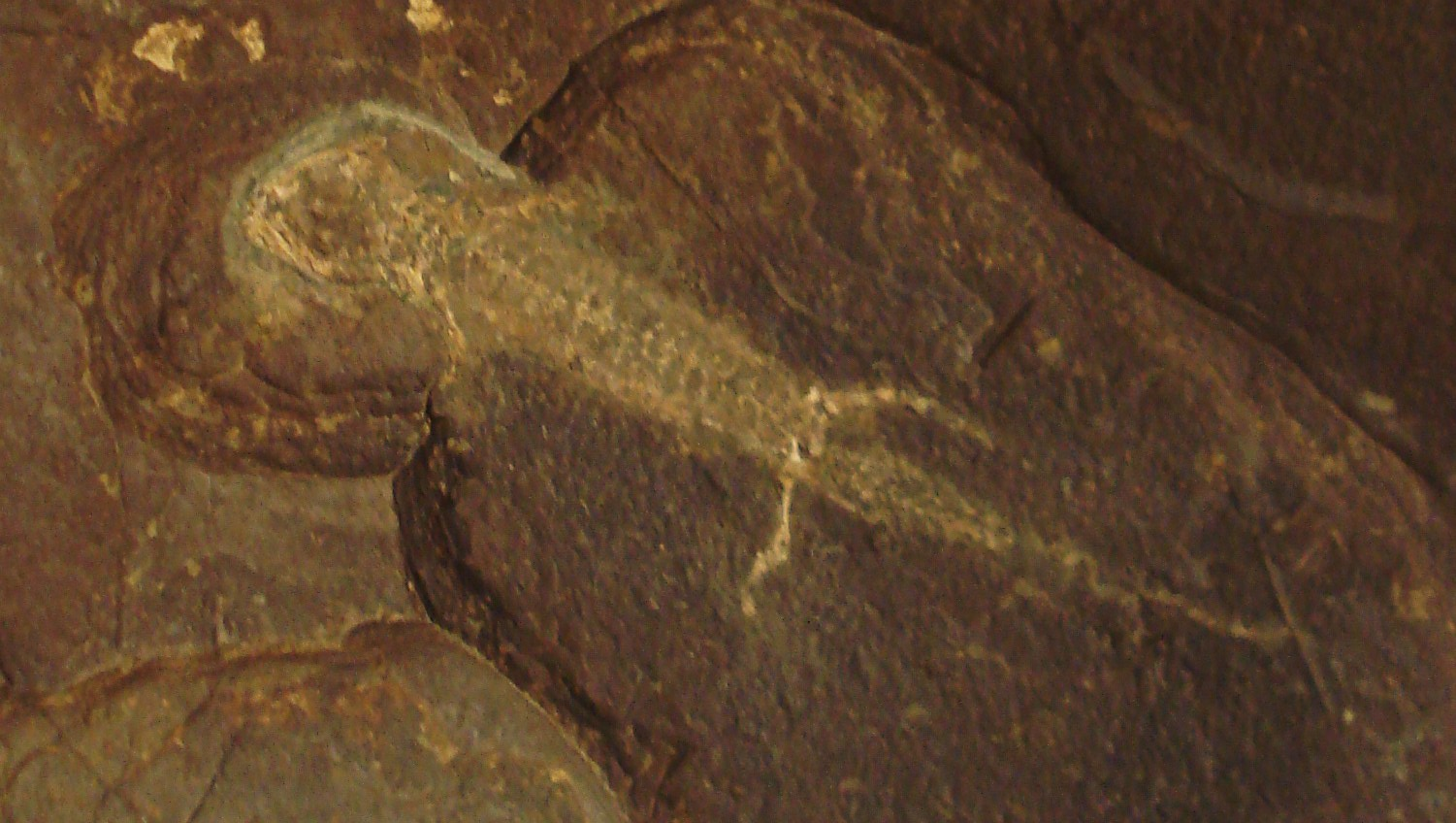
A larval fossil of Micromelerpeton

While most types of temnospondyls are distinguished on the basis of features in mature specimens, several are known from juvenile and larval specimens. Metamorphosis is seen in dissorophoids, eryopids and zatrachydids, with aquatic larvae developing into adults capable of living on land. Several types of dissorophoids, such as branchiosaurids, do not fully metamorphose, but retain features of juveniles such as external gills and small body size in what is known as neoteny. Dvinosaurians and the plagiosaurid Gerrothorax also retained gills, although recent studies found that (at least as adults) their gills were internal like those of fish, rather than external like those of salamanders.

Temnospondyl larvae are often distinguished by poorly developed bones and the presence of a hyobranchial apparatus, a series of bones that gills would attach to in life. However, some fully mature temnospondyls also possess hyobranchial bones but did not have external gills. A dense covering of scales is also seen in larvae and adults. Major body changes occur in metamorphosis, including the reshaping and strengthening of skull bones, the thickening of postcranial bones, and an increase in body size.

Temnospondyls like Sclerocephalus are known from both large adult specimens and small larvae, showing an extreme change in body shape. In these species, the shape and proportions of skull bones change in the early stages of development. The ornamentation on the surface of the skull roof also develops at this time. Small, regularly spaced pits are the first to form, followed by larger ridges. As development continues, the external gills disappear. Small teeth that once covered the palate are lost. The postcranial skeleton does not develop at the same rate as the skull, with ossification (the replacement of cartilage by bone) happening more slowly. Vertebrae and limb bones are poorly developed, ribs and fingers are absent in the early stages, and the scapulocoracoid and ischium are entirely absent through most of development. Once maturity is reached, most bones have fully formed and growth rate slows. The bones of some temnospondyls like Dutuitosaurus show growth marks, possibly an indication that growth rate varied with the change in seasons. Fossils of temnospondyls like Metoposaurus and Cheliderpeton show that individuals grew larger past maturity. The oldest individuals usually have more pitting on their skulls with deeper sulci.

One group of temnospondyls, the Branchiosauridae, is particularly well known from larval specimens. Branchiosaurids like Branchiosaurus and Apateon are represented by many fossils preserving skin and external gills. An entire growth series is exhibited in the wide range of sizes among specimens, but the lack of terrestrially adapted adult forms suggests that these temnospondyls were neotenic. Unlike other temnospondyls, their postcranial skeletons developed quickly but were still partly cartilaginous when fully mature. Adults likely had an aquatic lifestyle similar to juveniles. Recently, large specimens of Apateon gracilis were described with adaptations toward a terrestrial lifestyle, indicating that not all branchiosaurs were neotenic.

Studies of temnospondyl development have reached differing conclusions regarding what forms of gills were present in temnospondyls which possessed the organs. Although some species possessed external gills which were preserved as soft tissue, for many groups the type of gill can only be inferred from the structure of the bones which would have supported them. Scientists have disagreed on what these bones imply. Scientists who compare temnospondyls to fish find that the bones correlate with internal gills, while those who compare them closely to salamanders consider the bones to correlate with external gills. This conundrum, known as Bystrow's paradox, has made it difficult to assess the configuration of gills in aquatic temnospondyls.

Bystrow's paradox was resolved by a 2010 study. This study found that grooved ceratobrachnial structures (components of the branchial arches) are correlated with internal gills. Ancient tetrapods which preserved grooved ceratobranchials, such as the dvinosaur Dvinosaurus, probably only had internal gills as adults. Nevertheless, external gills are known to have been conclusively present in at least some temnospondyls. However, these situations only occur in larval specimens or members of specialized groups such as the branchiosaurids. One living species of lungfish (Lepidosiren) has external gills as larvae which are reconfigured into internal gills as adults. Despite adult Dvinosaurus specimens having skeletal features correlated with internal gills, another dvinosaur, Isodectes, includes larval fossils preserving external gills as soft tissue traces. Thus, the gill development of dvinosaurs (and presumably other temnospondyls) mirrored that of Lepidosiren. Despite this feature likely being an example of convergent evolution (as other lungfish exclusively possessed internal gills), it still remains a useful gauge for how temnospondyl gills developed. The study concluded that fully aquatic gilled temnospondyls (including but not limited to dvinosaurs) possessed internal gills as adults and external gills as larvae.

While most temnospondyls are aquatic in early stages of life, most metoposaurids appear to have been terrestrial in their juvenile stage. Like other Mesozoic temnospondyls, adult metoposaurids were adapted to a semiaquatic lifestyle. Their bones are not highly developed for movement on land. The cross-sectional thickness of limb bones in adult metoposaurids shows that they could not withstand the stress of terrestrial locomotion. Juvenile individuals have bones that are thick enough to withstand this stress, and could probably move about on land. To maintain a terrestrial lifestyle, a temnospondyl's limb bones would have to thicken with positive allometry, meaning that they would grow at a greater rate than the rest of the body. This is not the case in metoposaurids, meaning that as their bodies grew larger they became less adapted toward a terrestrial lifestyle.

=== Hearing ===
Temnospondyls and other early tetrapods have rounded otic notches in the back of the skull that project into the cheek region. In life, the otic notch would have been covered by a membrane called the tympanum, which is seen as a disk-like area in living frogs. The tympanum is involved in hearing, and is similar to the ear drum of more advanced tetrapods. It was traditionally thought that the tympanum developed very early in tetrapod evolution as a hearing organ and progressed to form the eardrum of amniotes. Thus, temnospondyls possessed a hearing system supposedly ancestral to that of living amphibians and reptiles.

Frogs and all other living tetrapods have a rod-like bone called the stapes that aids in hearing by transferring vibrations from the ear drum—or homologous tympanum—to the inner ear. Temnospondyls also have a stapes, which projects into the otic cavity. The stapes likely evolved from the hyomandibula of lobe-finned fishes. The positioning of the stapes and the shape of the otic region suggests that the tympani of temnospondyls and frogs are homologous, but the tympani of these amphibians are no longer considered homologous with the hearing systems of reptiles, birds and mammals. Therefore, ear structures in temnospondyls were not ancestral to those of all other tetrapods.

The ability of the tympanum and stapes to effectively transmit vibrations is called impedance matching. Early tetrapods like temnospondyls have thick stapes with poor impedance matching, so it is now thought that they were not used for hearing. Instead, these thick stapes may have functioned to support the tissue that covers the otic notch. Early temnospondyls, like Dendrerpeton, could not hear airborne sound but would have been able to detect vibration in the ground. Later temnospondyls like Doleserpeton had otic regions adapted to hearing. Doleserpeton has a structure in the inner ear called the perilymphatic duct, which is also seen in frogs and is associated with hearing. Its stapes is also a better transmitter of sound. The hearing system of Doleserpeton and related temnospondyls was able to detect airborne sound and may have been ancestral to that of living amphibians.

== Notes ==
1. Owen placed Labyrinthodon in Batrachia, a group that includes frogs, and classified Batrachia within Reptilia. What are today classified as reptiles (lizards, snakes, crocodilians and turtles) were called saurian reptiles.
