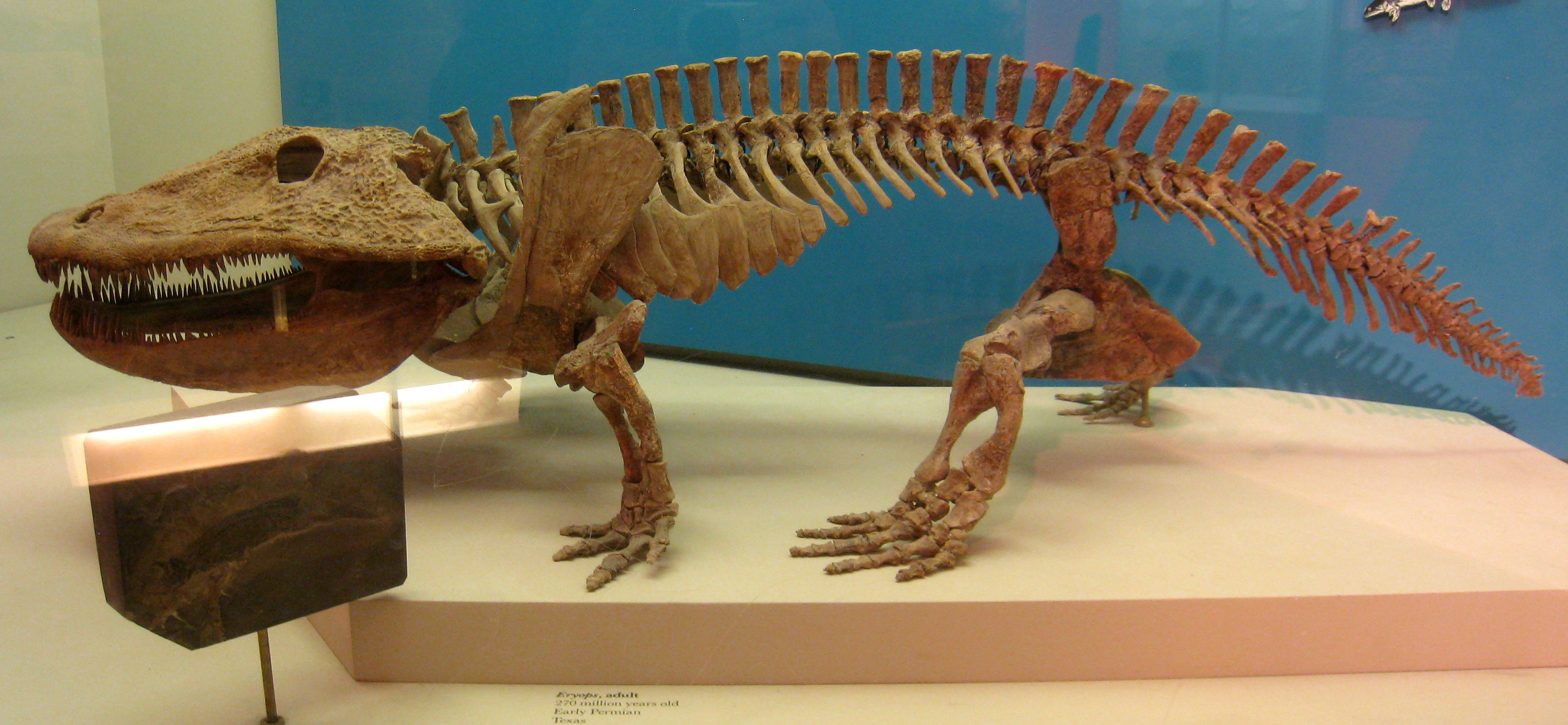
- Skeleton cast of Eryops megacephalus

Scientific classification
- Domain: Eukaryota
- Kingdom: Animalia
- Phylum: Chordata
- Order: †Temnospondyli
- Clade: †Rhachitomi
- Clade: †Eryopiformes; Schoch, 2013

Clades
- †Eryopidae; †Stereospondylomorpha

= Eryopiformes =

Eryopiformes Temporal range: Early Carboniferous - Early Cretaceous, 330–120 Ma Possible descendant taxon Lissamphibia survives to present.

Extinct clade of temnospondyls

Eryopiformes is a group of rhachitomi temnospondyls. Eryopiformes was named by the German paleontologist Rainer R. Schoch in 2013. He defined it as a node-based taxon to include Eryopidae and Stereospondylomorpha. Unlike previous analyses, a phylogenetic analysis he performed found no support for a monophyletic Euskelia, that is defined to include Dissorophoidea and Eryopidae (and also usually includes Zatracheidae), in relation to Stereospondylomorpha. In this analysis, Eryopidae and Stereospondylomorpha usually formed a monophyletic clade that excludes the clade formed by Zatracheidae and Dissorophoidea. Thus, he named this newly identified group as Eryopiformes.
