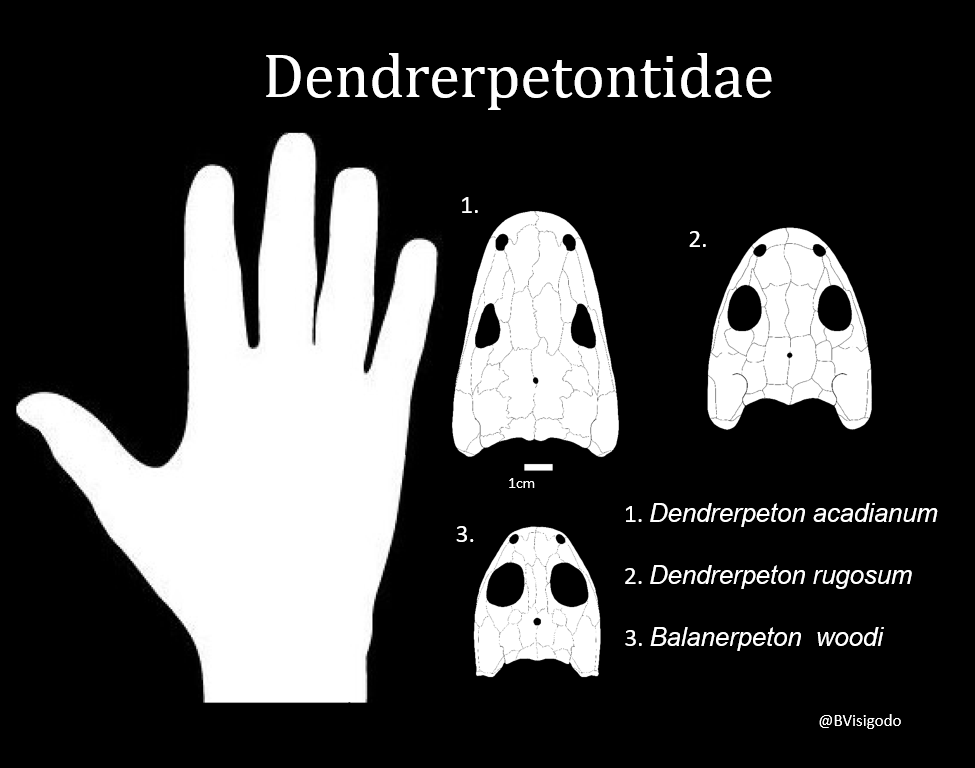
- Diagram of dendrerpetontid skulls

Scientific classification
- Kingdom: Animalia
- Phylum: Chordata
- Clade: Tetrapoda
- Order: †Temnospondyli
- Family: †Dendrerpetontidae; Frič, 1885

Genera
- †Balanerpeton?; †Dendrerpeton

= Dendrerpetontidae =

Dendrerpetontidae Temporal range: 342 Ma

Extinct family of temnospondyls

Dendrerpetontidae is a family of basal temnospondyls that lived during the Carboniferous period.

== Gallery ==
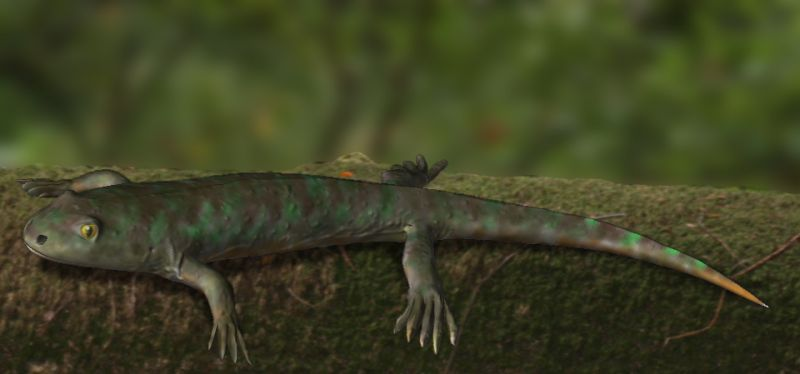
Balanerpeton woodi, of the early Carboniferous of Scotland

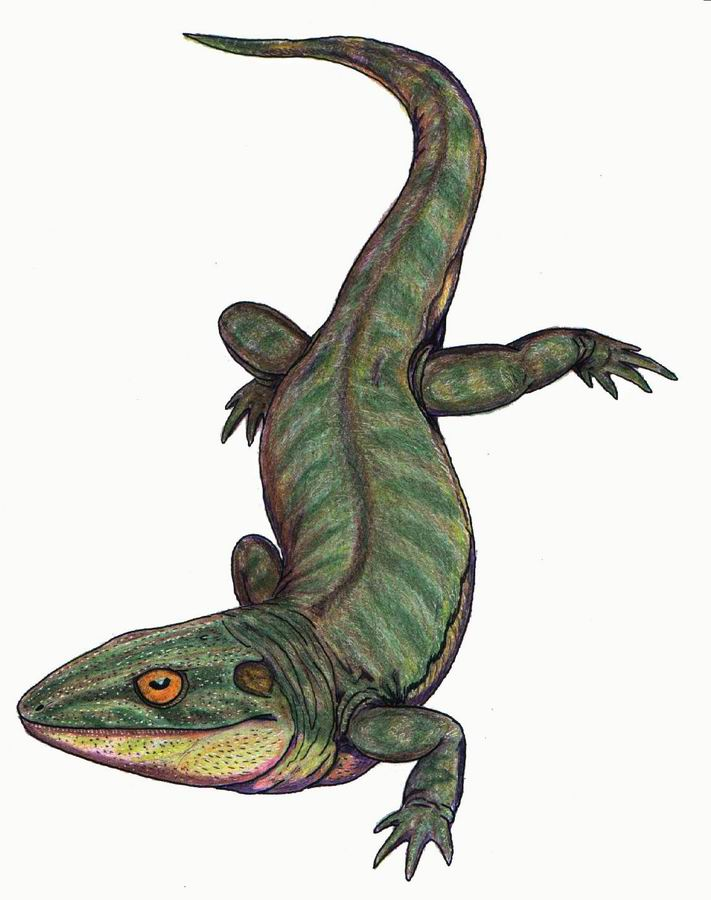
Dendrerpeton, of the late Carboniferous of Nova Scotia and Ireland
