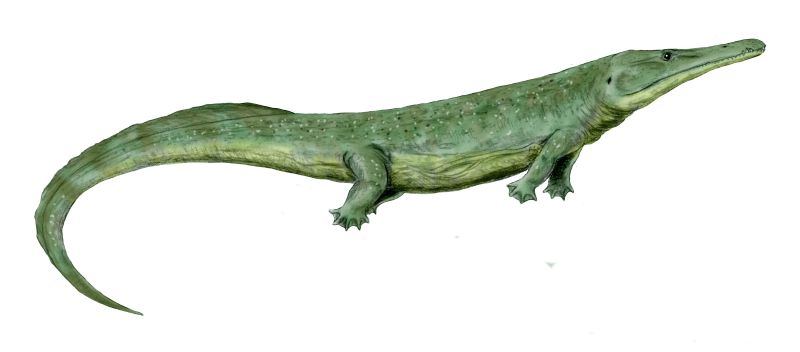
- Life restoration of Prionosuchus plummeri

Scientific classification
- Domain: Eukaryota
- Kingdom: Animalia
- Phylum: Chordata
- Order: †Temnospondyli
- Clade: †Limnarchia
- Clade: †Stereospondylomorpha; Yates and Warren, 2000

Clades
- †Archegosauroidea; †Stereospondyli

= Stereospondylomorpha =

Stereospondylomorphs Temporal range: 301–120 Ma

Extinct clade of temnospondyls

Stereospondylomorpha is a clade of temnospondyls. It includes the superfamily Archegosauroidea and the more diverse group Stereospondyli. Stereospondylomorpha was first proposed by Yates and Warren (2000), who found Archegosauroidea and Stereospondyli to be sister taxa in their phylogenetic analysis. A similar clade is Archegosauriformes, named by Schoch and Milner (2000), which includes Stereospondyli and some Permian temnospondyls that are similar in appearance to stereospondyls, including the archegosauroids. However, according to Schoch and Milner's phylogeny, Archegosauroidea is a paraphyletic group of taxa that are successively basal to Stereospondyli, rather than a monophyletic sister taxon.

Chinlestegophis, a putative Triassic stereospondyl considered to be related to metoposauroids such as Rileymillerus, has been noted to share many features with caecilians, a living group of legless burrowing amphibians. If Chinlestegophis is indeed both an advanced stereospondyl and a relative of caecilians, this means that stereospondylomorphs (in the form of caecilians) survived to the present day.
