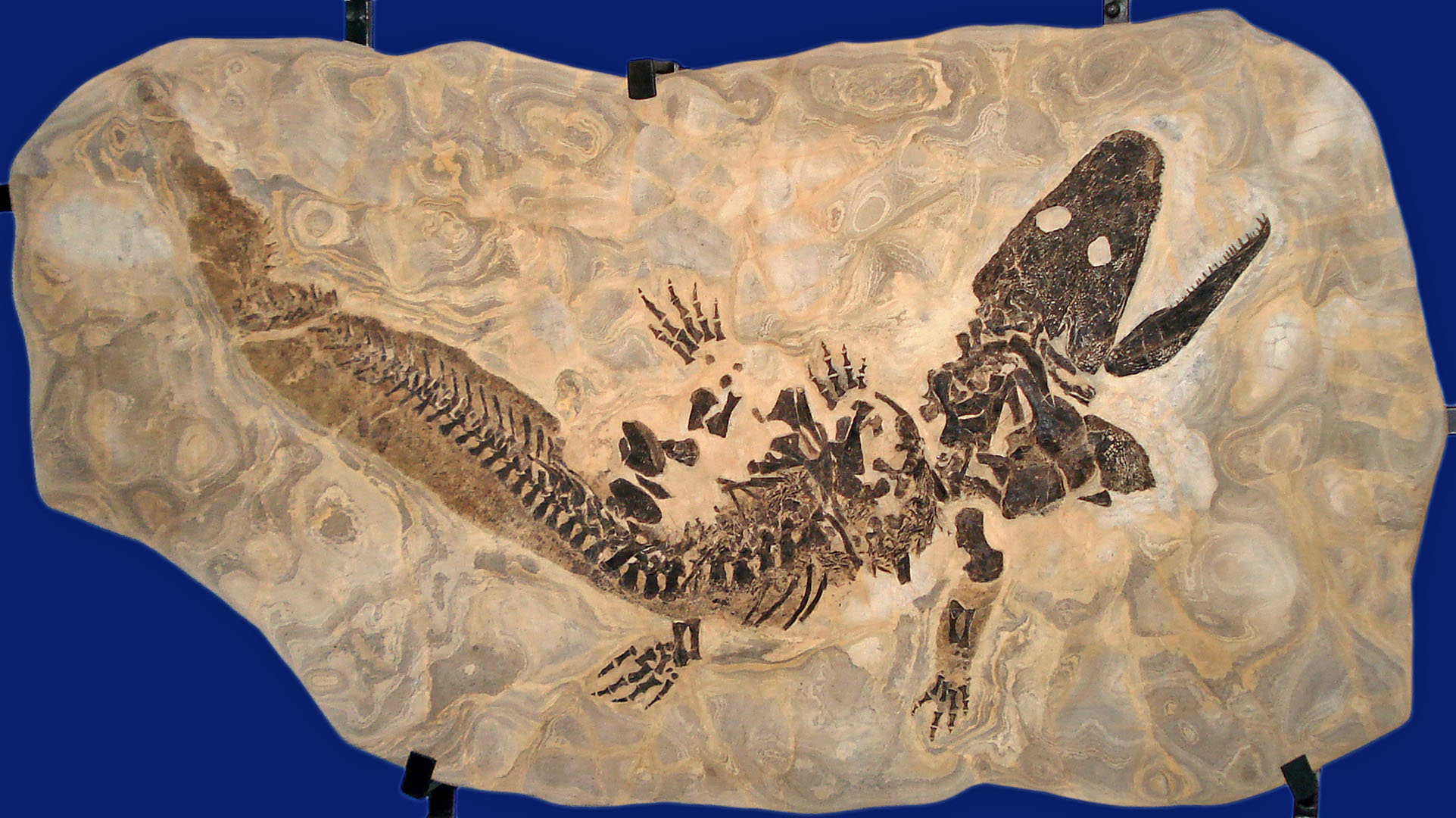
- One of the best preserved fossil skeletons of Sclerocephalus haeuseri

Scientific classification
- Kingdom: Animalia
- Phylum: Chordata
- Clade: Tetrapoda
- Order: †Temnospondyli
- Family: †Sclerocephalidae; Jaekel, 1909
- Genus: †Sclerocephalus; Goldfuss, 1847

Species
- †S. haeuseri Goldfuss, 1847 (type); †S. bavaricus (Branco, 1887); †S. concordiae Schoch & Sobral, 2021; †S. credneri Fritsch, 1901; †S. jogischneideri Werneburg, 1992; †S. megalorhinus Schoch, 2025; †S. nobilis Werneburg, 1992; †S. odernheimensis Schoch, 2025; †S. stambergi Klembara & Steyer, 2012

Synonyms
- Genus-level: Weissia Branco, 1887; Klauswaldia Krätschmer & Resch, 2005; Species-level: Weissia bavarica Branco, 1887; Klauswaldia nobile Krätschmer & Resch, 2005

= Sclerocephalus =

Sclerocephalus Temporal range: Late Carboniferous – Early Permian, 301–297 Ma

Extinct genus of amphibians

Sclerocephalus is an extinct genus of temnospondyl amphibian from the lowermost Permian of Germany and Czech Republic with nine valid species, including the type species S. haeuseri. It is one of the most completely preserved and most abundant Palaeozoic tetrapods. Sclerocephalus was once thought to be closely related to eryopoid temnospondyls, but it is now thought to be more closely related to archegosauroids. It is the only genus in the family Sclerocephalidae.

== Description and lifestyle ==
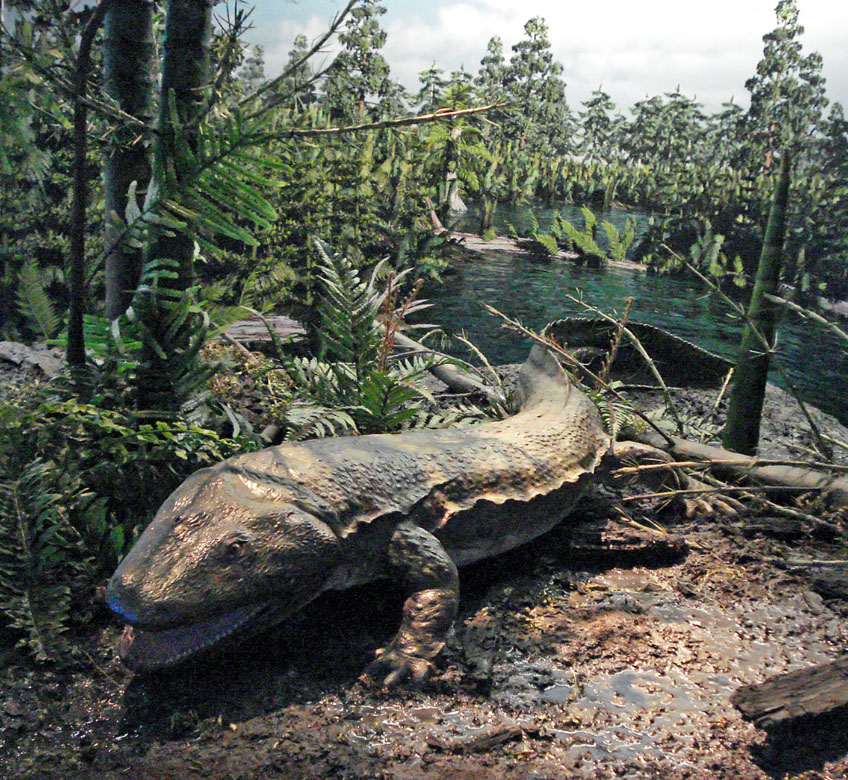
Diorama with model reconstruction of Sclerocephalus haeuseri

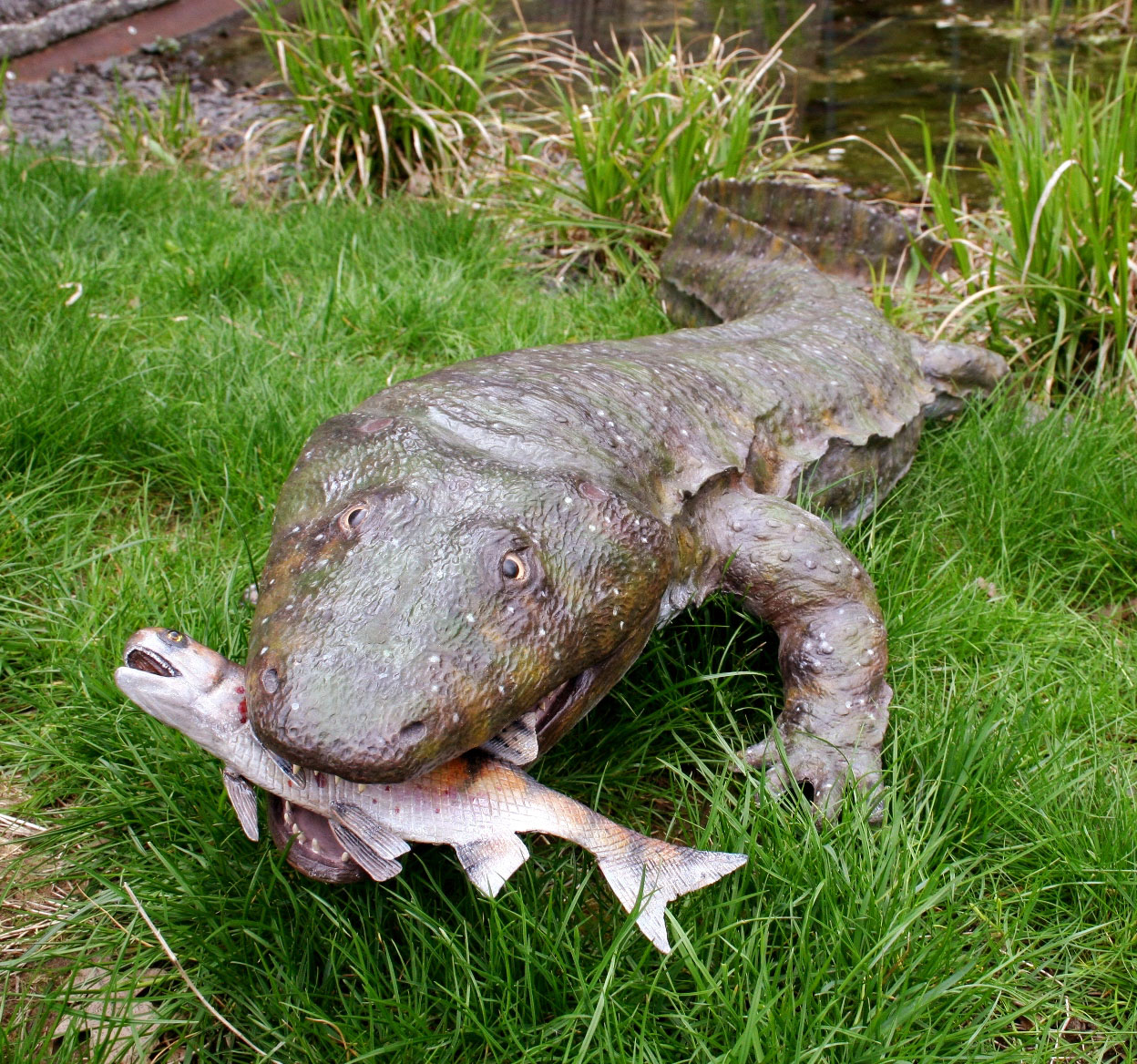
Sclerocephalus (model) with prey Paramblypterus

The adults animals reached a body length of ca. 150 cm, and had an elongate trunk and a laterally compressed tail. In some specimens lateral line sulci are retained. These body features suggest an aquatic mode of life, with aquatic larvae that probably breathed with external gills like modern tadpoles, while the adults breathed with lungs. Sclerocephalus underwent significant changes during its ontogeny, for example the eyes are much larger and the tail much longer in larvae than in adults. The latest revision, redescription and phylogenetic study of this genus was provided by Schoch & Witzmann (2009).

Sclerocephalus was often classified within the deprecated paraphyletic taxa Stegocephalia and Labyrinthodontia, because of a skull that was connected to the shoulder girdle and teeth of labyrinthodont type. The skull had a distinct pineal foramen. Besides the usual row of teeth in the upper and lower jaw, Sclerocephalus also had three additional pairs of palatine teeth. From specimens with fossilized stomach content we know the adults mainly fed on fish of the genus Paramblypterus, but sometimes also on other amphibians (Branchiosaurus, Micromelerpeton) and even small conspecifics.

== Discovery ==
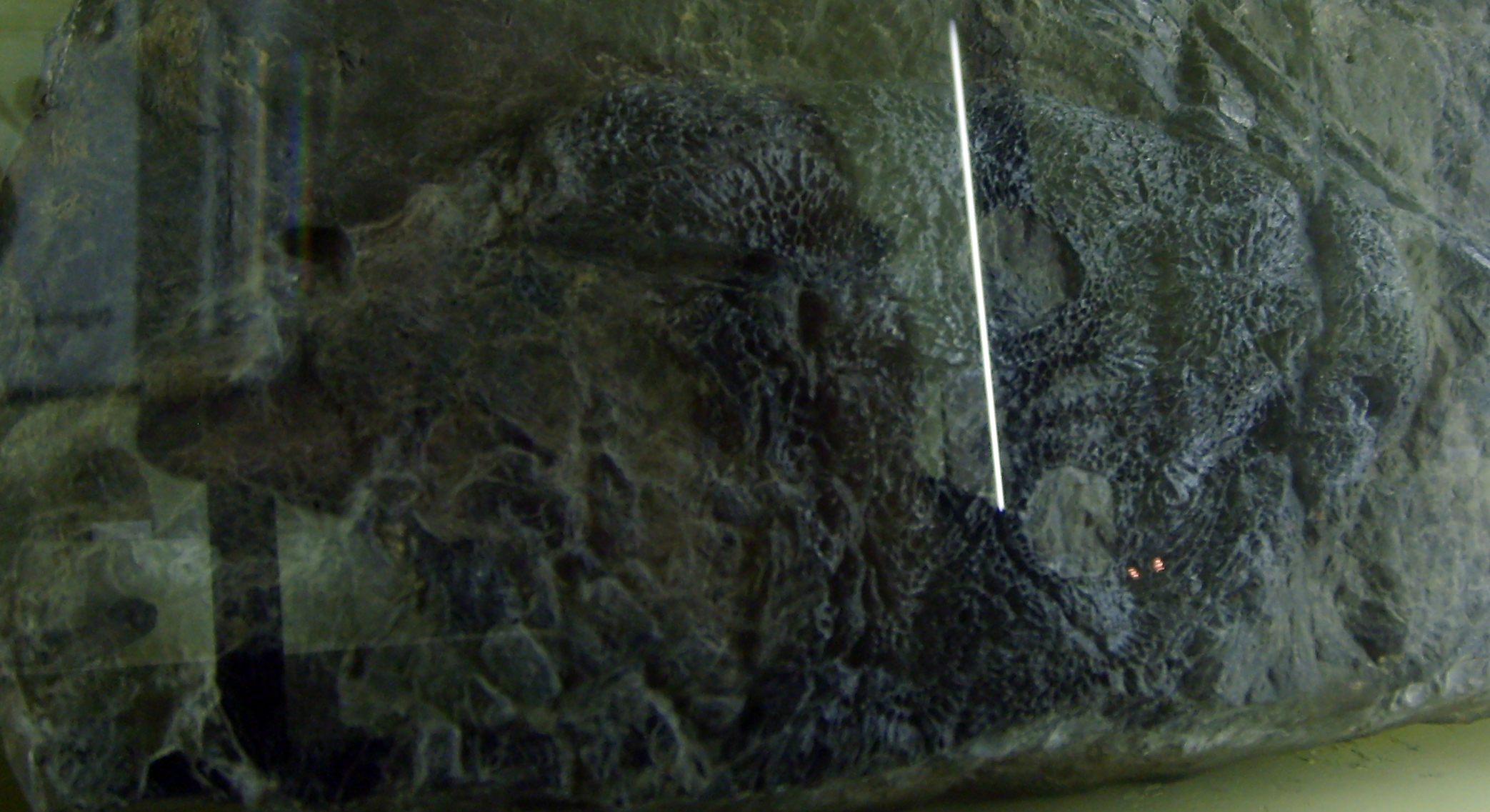
S. bavaricus skull at the Museum für Naturkunde, Berlin

The holotype of Sclerocephalus haeuseri was described 1847 by the German paleontologist Georg August Goldfuss, who misidentified the fossil as skull of a fish. The famous American vertebrate paleontologist Alfred Romer recognized in 1939 that the fossil amphibians described as Leptorophus levis are the larvae of Sclerocephalus. The most important modern research on Sclerocephalus was published by Boy (1988) and Schoch (2000, 2002, 2003, 2009).

A famous locality that yielded numerous excellently preserved fossils of Sclerocephalus is Odernheim am Glan in Rhineland-Palatinate (Germany), where the Permian sediments of the Rotliegend have even been named "Stegocephalenkalke" (= Stegocephalia limestones).

== Taxonomy ==
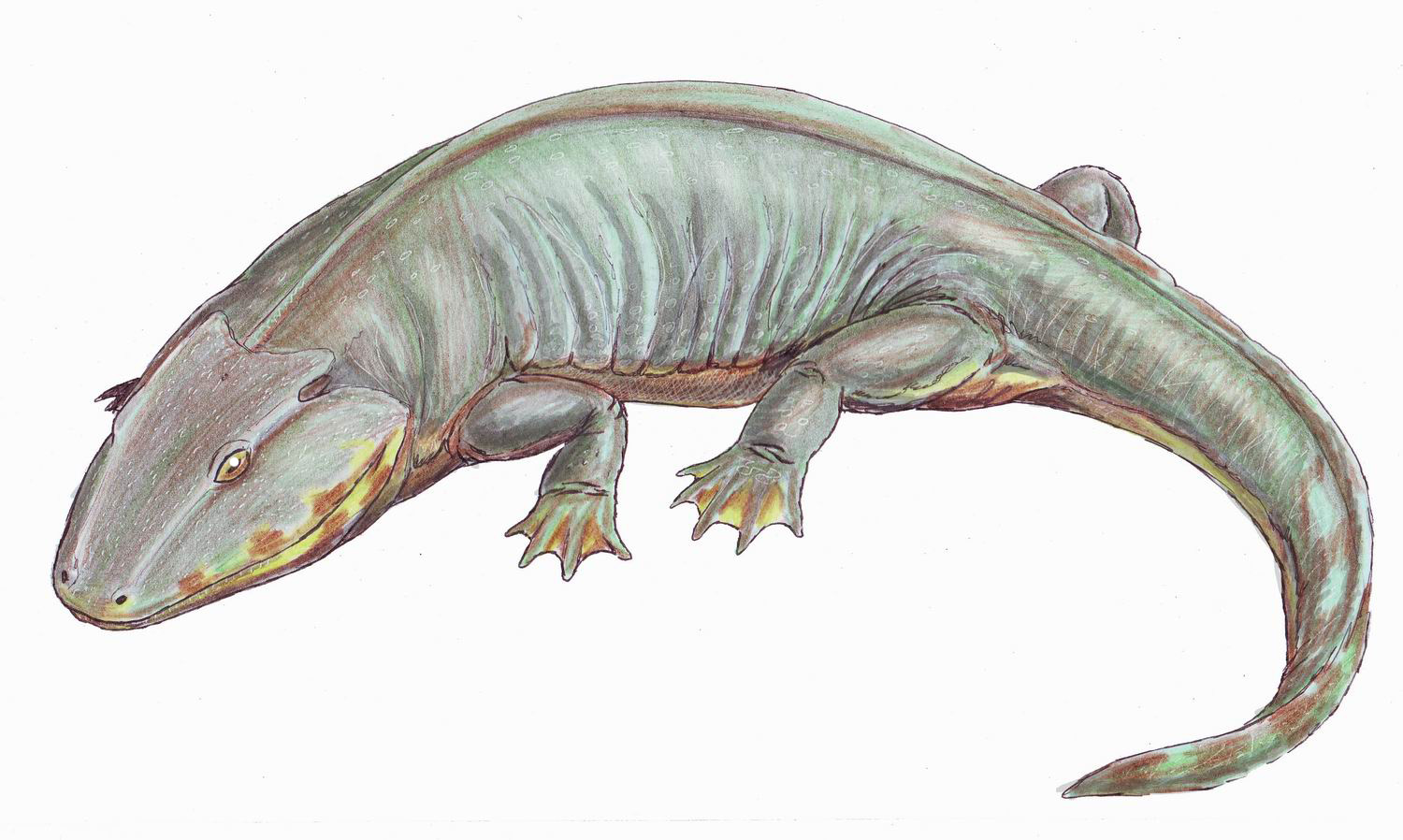
Life restoration of Sclerocephalus haeuseri

Krätschmer (2004) questioned the validity of the type species Sclerocephalus haeuseri, of which the holotype is lost, and considered Pfarrwaldia jeckenbachensis as valid name for the neotype designated by Boy (1988). This was refuted in the revision of Schoch & Witzmann (2009), who considered P. jeckenbachensis as younger synonym of S. haeuseri.

The following four species are recognized as valid by Schoch & Witzmann (2009):

- Sclerocephalus haeuseri Goldfuss, 1847 from the Asselian (Lower Rotliegend) of Rhineland-Palatinate in Germany.
- Sclerocephalus bavaricus (Branco, 1887) from the Asselian (Lower Rotliegend) or uppermost Pennsylvanian (Gzhelian) of Rhineland-Palatinate in Germany.
- Sclerocephalus jogischneideri Werneburg, 1992 from the Asselian (Lower Rotliegend) of Thuringia in Germany
- Sclerocephalus nobilis (Krätschmer & Resch, 2005) from the Asselian (Lower Rotliegend) of Rhineland-Palatinate in Germany.

== Phylogeny ==
Relationships according to Yates and Warren, 2000

- - Euskelia
    - Dissorophoidea
    - - Zatracheidae
      - Eryopidae
  - Limnarchia
    - Dvinosauria
    - - Stereospondylomorpha
        - Archegosauroidea
          - Sclerocephalus
          - Archegosaurus
        - Stereospondyli

Relationships according to Boy, 1990

- - Dissorophoidea
  - Eryopoidea
    - Zatracheidae
    - Eryopidae
    - Stereospondylomorpha

The phylogenetic relationships of Sclerocephalus are uncertain. It was traditionally considered a close relative of the genus Onchiodon, and both were placed in the family Actinodontidae. Actinodontidae was thought to be closely related to the family Eryopidae, and is now considered a synonym of that group. However, while Sclerocephalus shares some similarities with eryopids, it also shares much in common with a group of large-bodied, semiaquatic temnospondyls called Stereospondylomorpha. Sclerocephalus and Onchiodon are no longer thought to be closely related, and while Onchiodon remains a close relative of eryopids, Sclerocephalus is often grouped near the genus Archegosaurus as a basal stereospondylomorph.

The most commonly accepted phylogeny of temnospondyls (first proposed by Yates and Warren [2000]) divides the group into two different branches called Limnarchia and Euskelia. Limnarchia is a diverse Mesozoic clade that includes Stereospondylomorpha. Euskelia is a smaller Paleozoic clade that includes Eryopidae and the group Dissorophoidea, which may have given rise to modern amphibians. An earlier phylogeny proposed by Boy (1990) takes a different view, combining Eryopidae and Stereospondylomorpha into the group Eryopoidea, with dissorophoids as distant relatives. If this phylogeny is correct, Sclerocephalus would be a basal member of Eryopoidea, close to the ancestry of most other stereospondylomorphs.

Schoch & Witzmann (2009) found support for the Eryopoidea clade. They included Sclerocephalus in their phylogenetic analysis and found it to nest at the base of Stereospondylomorpha. Below is a cladogram from their study:

- Temnospondyli
  - Capetus palustris
  - - Dendrerpeton acadianum
    - - Trimerorhachis insignis
      - - Dissorophoidea
          - Acanthostomatops vorax
          - - Ecolsonia cutlerensis
            - Micropholis stowi
        - Iberospondylus schultzei
        - - Palatinerpeton kraetschmeri
          - Eryopoidea
            - Eryopidae
              - "Onchiodon" frossardi (now Actinodon frossardi)
              - - Onchiodon labyrinthicus
                - Eryops megacephalus
            - Stereospondylomorpha
              - Sclerocephalus spp.
              - - Cheliderpeton latirostre
                - Archegosaurus decheni

== Palaeobiology ==
=== Life history ===
Sclerocephalus had an exceptionally plastic ontogeny evidencing very wide developmental reaction norms that may have enabled high adaptability to different abiotic environmental conditions. Alternatively, it is possible that the fossil assemblages showing highly divergent life histories within Sclerocephalus represent different times in Earth's history and indicate very rapid evolution of the developmental sequence of this temnospondyl.
