= Palatinerpeton =

Palatinerpeton Temporal range: Asselian ~298–290 Ma

Scientific classification
- Domain: Eukaryota
- Kingdom: Animalia
- Phylum: Chordata
- Order: †Temnospondyli
- Clade: †Stereospondylomorpha (?)
- Genus: †Palatinerpeton; Boy, 1996

Type species
- †Palatinerpeton kraetschmeri Boy, 1996

Extinct genus of amphibians

Palatinerpeton is an extinct genus of temnospondyl amphibian. Fossils have been found in the Lauterecken-Odernheim Formation of Germany.

== Phylogeny ==
Palatinerpeton is one of several Late Carboniferous and Early Permian European temnospondyls with uncertain affinities; the others include Iberospondylus, Sclerocephalus, and Cheliderpeton. Phylogenetic studies have placed them as either early representatives of a group called Stereospondylomorpha, or close relatives of a group called Eryopidae. Stereospondylomorpha is a large clade mostly made up of Mesozoic taxa, while Eryopidae is a small family consisting of several Carboniferous and Permian temnospondyls. These two groups are usually considered distantly related. Schoch & Witzmann (2009) conducted a phylogenetic analysis in which Eryopidae and Stereospondylomorpha were found to be closely related, both members of a clade called Eryopoidea. Palatinerpeton was found to be the sister taxon of Eryopoidea. Below is a cladogram from their study:

- Temnospondyli
  - Capetus palustris
  - - Dendrerpeton acadianum
    - - Trimerorhachis insignis
      - - Dissorophoidea
          - Acanthostomatops vorax
          - - Ecolsonia cutlerensis
            - Micropholis stowi
        - Iberospondylus schultzei
        - - Palatinerpeton kraetschmeri
          - Eryopoidea
            - Eryopidae
              - "Onchiodon" frossardi
              - - Onchiodon labyrinthicus
                - Eryops megacephalus
            - Stereospondylomorpha
              - Sclerocephalus spp.
              - - Cheliderpeton latirostre
                - Archegosaurus decheni
