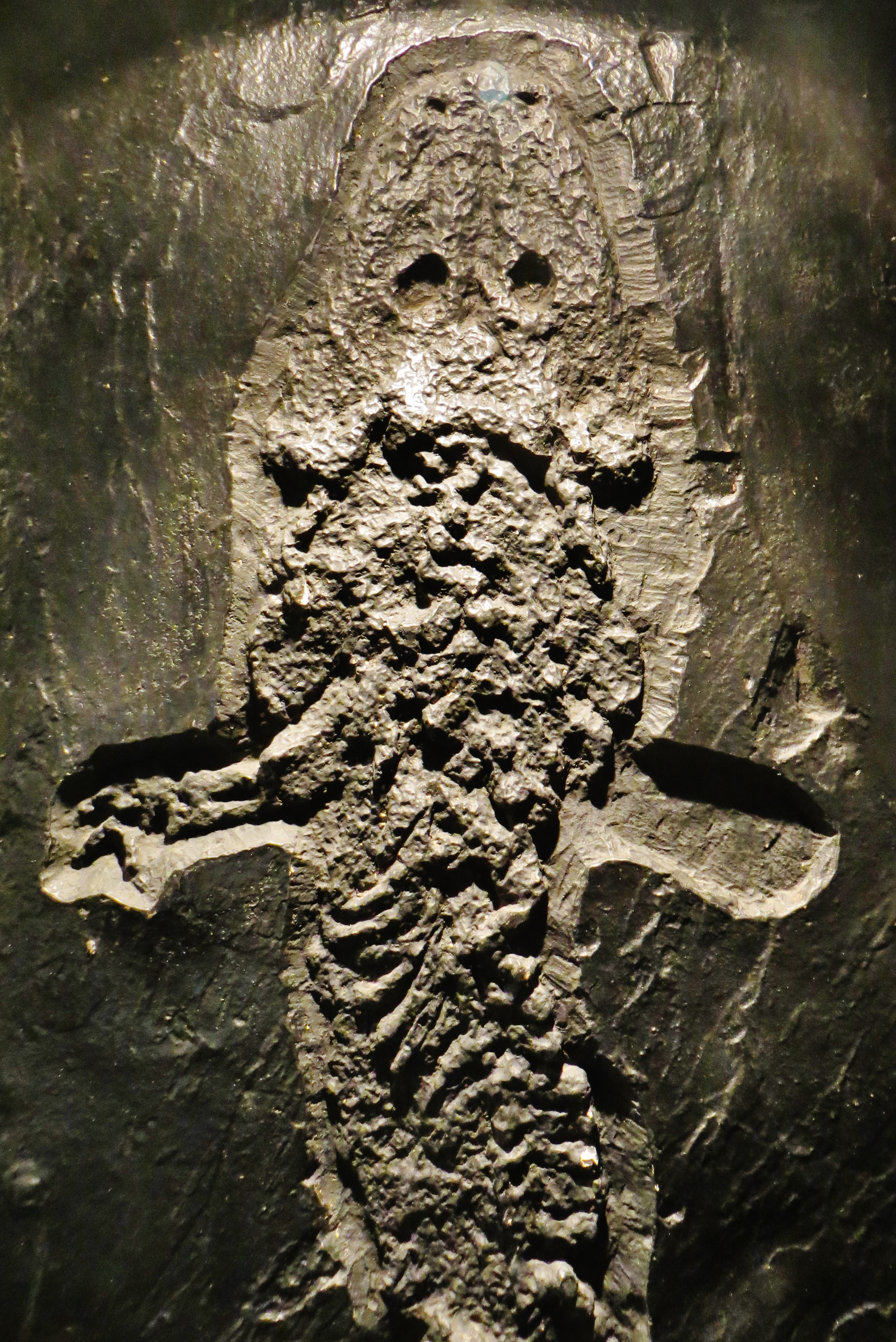
- Actinodon sp. at the Museum of Natural History, Autun
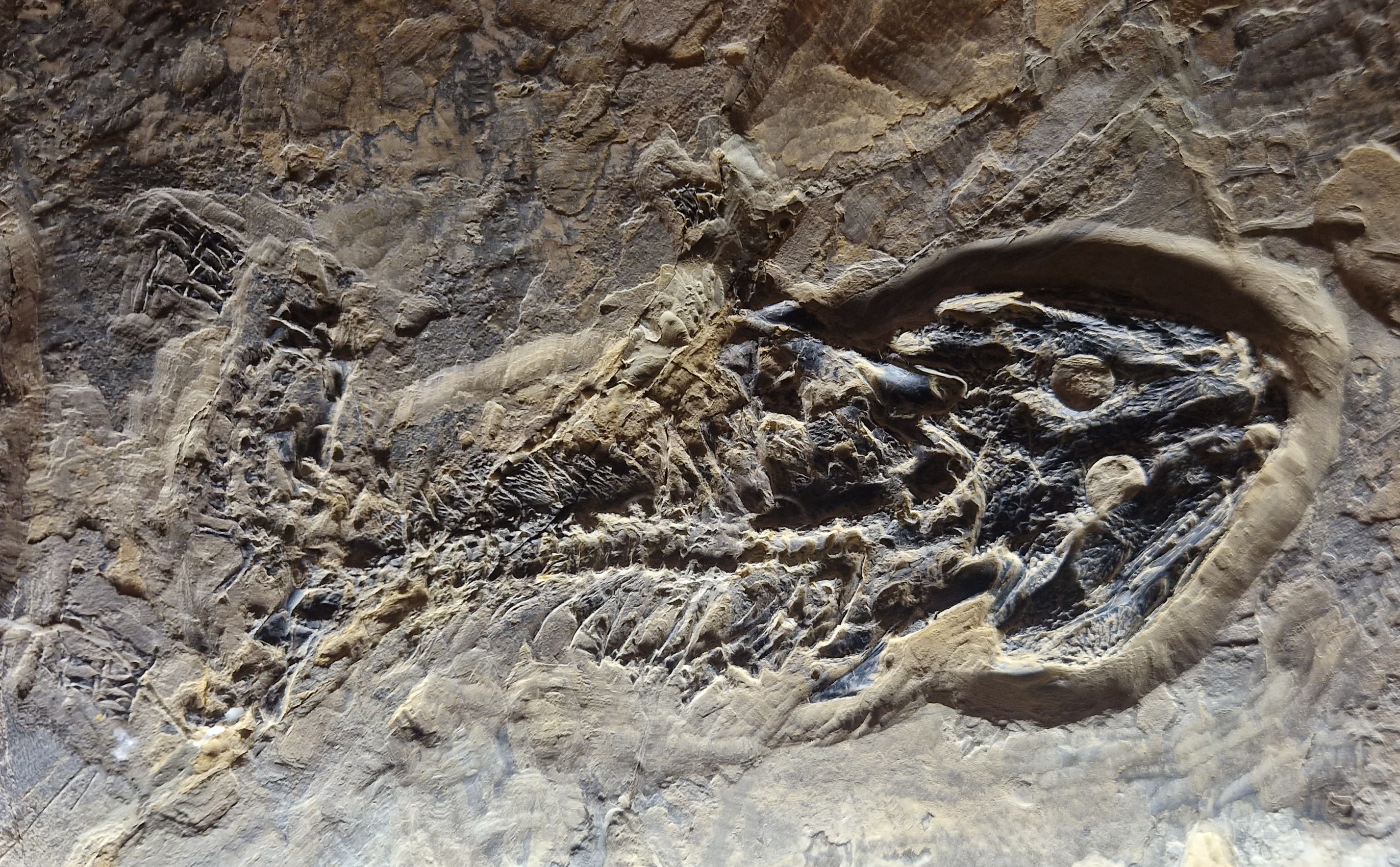
- Actinodon fossil from Germany

Scientific classification
- Kingdom: Animalia
- Phylum: Chordata
- Clade: Tetrapoda
- Order: †Temnospondyli
- Family: †Eryopidae
- Genus: †Actinodon; Gaudry, 1866

Type species
- †Actinodon frossardi Gaudry, 1866

= Actinodon =

Actinodon Temporal range: Early Permian, 298.9–273.01 Ma

Extinct genus of amphibians

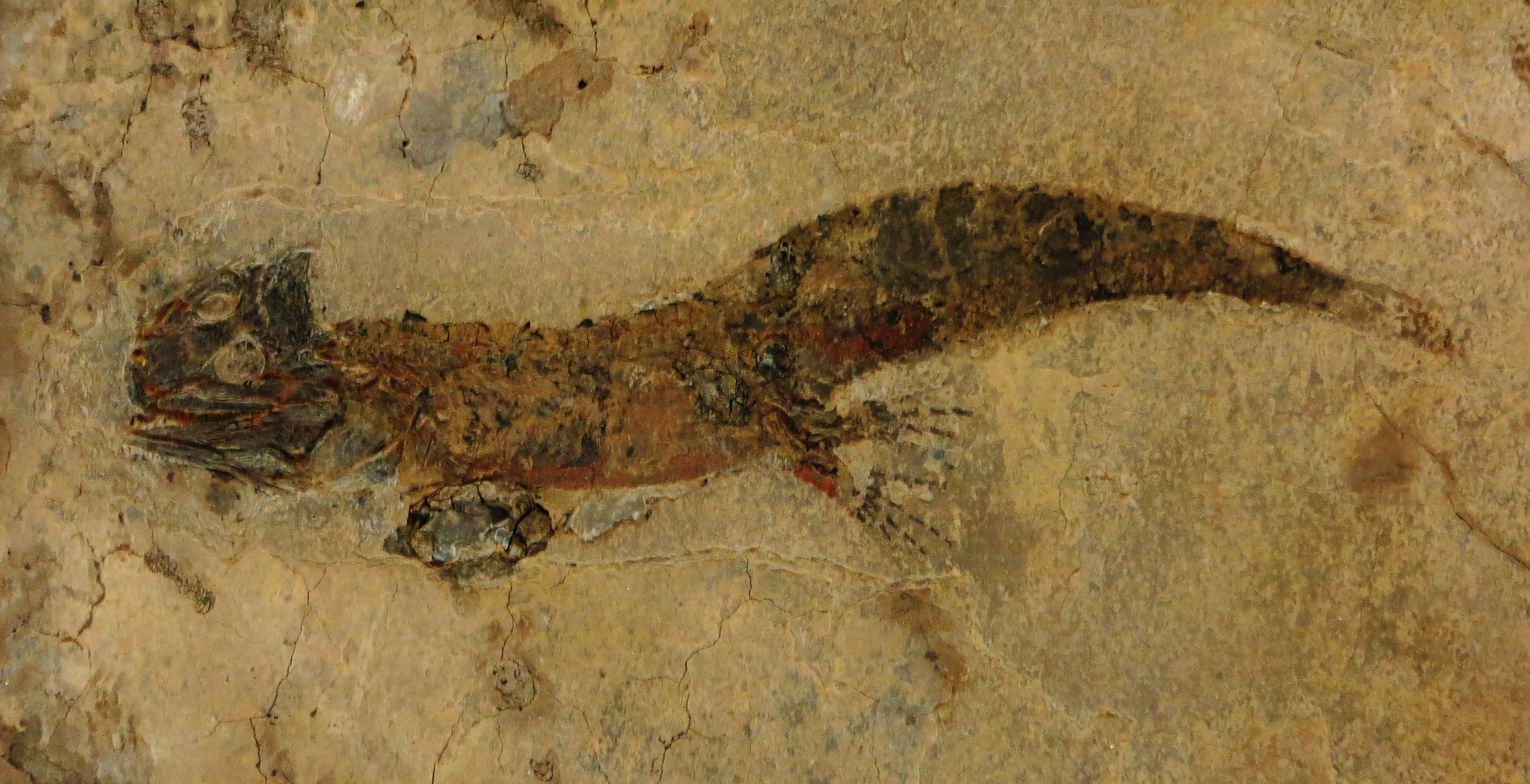
Actinodon juvenile (Senckenberg Museum, Frankfurt)

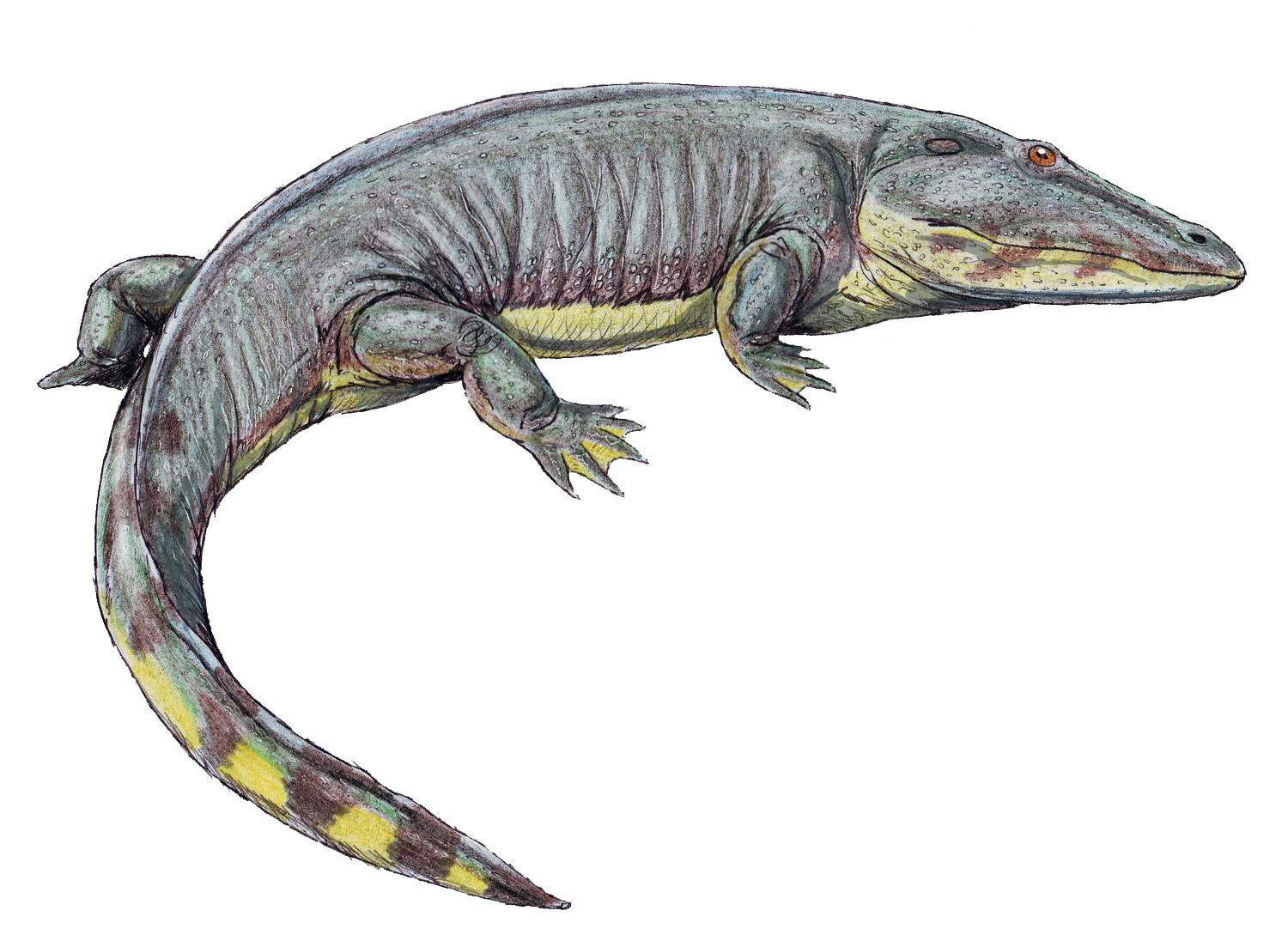
Life restoration of Actinodon frossardi

Actinodon is an extinct genus of eryopoidean temnospondyl within the family Eryopidae.

== History of study ==
Actinodon was named in 1866 by French paleontologist Jean Albert Gaudry based on a holotype skull that was collected by Charles Frossard near Muse in the Autun Basin (early Permian) of France. The status and relationship of the taxon was long problematic because the holotype was thought to be lost, until it was rediscovered in the collections of the Museum d'Histoire Naturelle in 1996. In the intervening 130 years, a variety of specimens were described by other workers, some of which were attributed to other species or only to the genus level. Werneburg & Steyer (1999) were the most recent to redescribe material of this taxon, and they referred it to the eryopoid Onchiodon as a valid species, while Schoch & Milner (2000) argued that it might be a species of the stereospondylomorph Sclerocephalus, but phylogenetic analyses have not recovered A. frossardi in a clade with the type species of either genus (O. labyrinthicus, S. haeuseri), and Schoch & Milner (2014) maintained it separate from Onchiodon.

Other species of Actinodon remain synonymized with other species: A. brevis and Euchirosaurus rochei with A. frossardi; and A. germanicus with Cheliderpeton vranyi. Several other species have been previously placed in Actinodon after being named in other genera, but have since been restored to their original genera or placed elsewhere: Glanochthon latirostris and Lysipterygium risinense. In the present concept, A. frossardi is the only species within the genus, and material of this taxon is only known from the early Permian of France.

== Anatomy ==
Actinodon has a similar skull profile to stereospondylomorphs like Sclerocephalus, but like other eryopoids, it has a proportionately shorter and wider posterior skull table; a longer prefrontal with a pointed anterior end; and a sutured basicranial articulation. Within eryopoids, the anatomy is indeed very similar to Onchiodon, and the continued separation of these genera by Schoch & Milner (2014) is based on a disagreement over the interpretation of two features purportedly shared between them, a wide choana and palatal fangs only on the palatine and ectopterygoid, that Werneburg & Steyer (1999) identified. Schoch & Milner argued that the choana is actually slit-like, and that the size and number of teeth is more variable. Some of this also stems from perceptions over the monophyly of Onchiodon, of which there are several valid species. Material of Actinodon tends to be smaller than that of many other eryopoids, which may account for some of the more proportional differences.

== Relationships ==
Below is the phylogeny of Eryopidae from Schoch (2021):

- Eryopidae
  - Actinodon frossardi
  - - Osteophorus roemeri
    - - Glaukerpeton avinoffi
      - - - Onchiodon labyrinthicus
          - Onchiodon thuringiensis
        - - Clamorosaurus nocturnus
          - - Eryops sp. Moran
            - - Eryops anatinus
              - Eryops megacephalus
