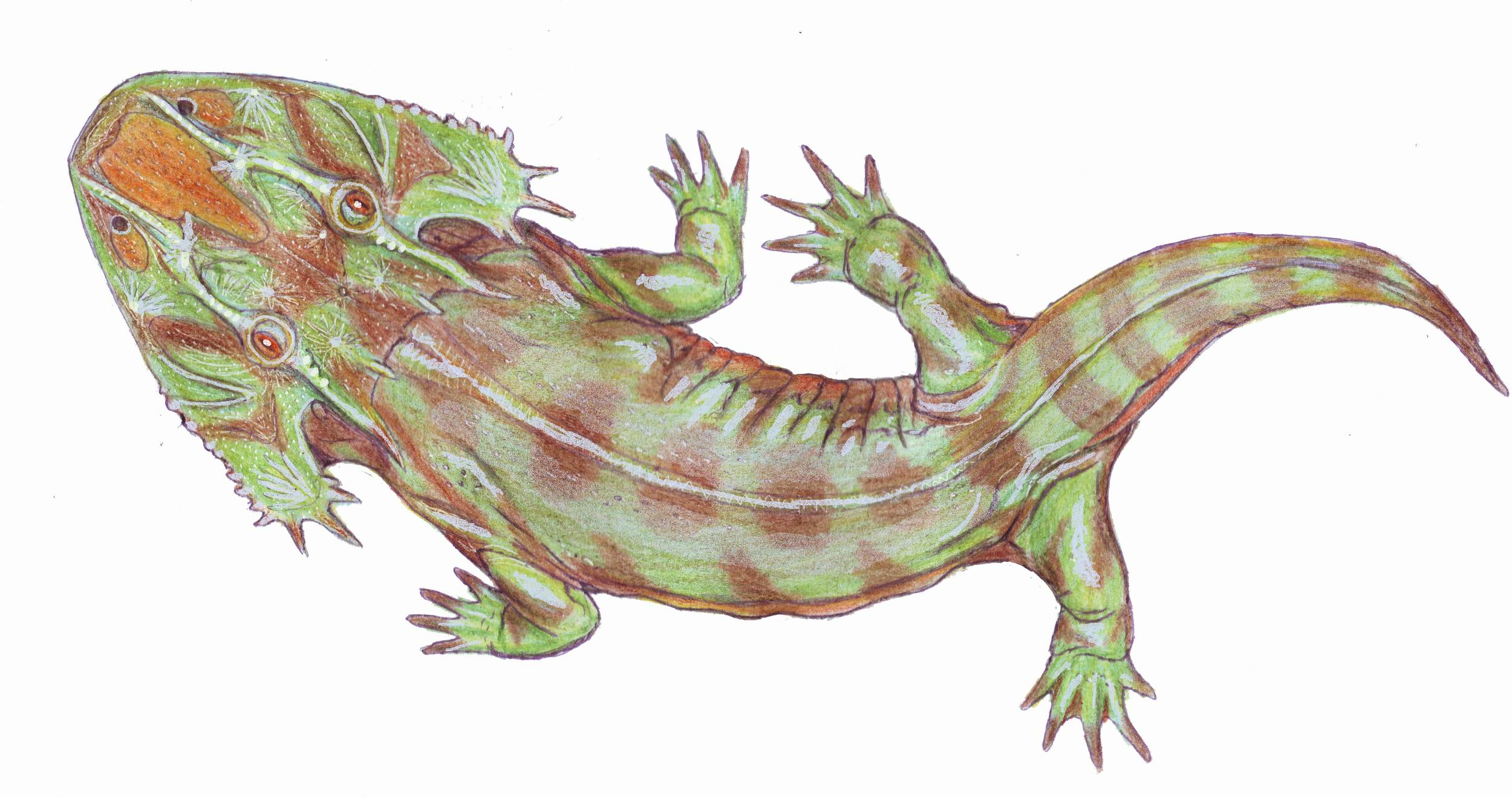
- Zatrachys serratus

Scientific classification
- Domain: Eukaryota
- Kingdom: Animalia
- Phylum: Chordata
- Order: †Temnospondyli
- Family: †Zatracheidae
- Genus: †Zatrachys; Cope, 1878

= Zatrachys =

Zatrachys Temporal range: Late Carboniferous to Early Permian, 303–272 Ma

Extinct genus of temnospondyls

Zatrachys is an extinct genus of large and flat-headed zatracheid temnospondyl from the early Permian of North America.

== History of study ==
Zatrachys was named by American paleontologist Edward Drinker Cope in 1878 for the type species, Z. serratus, based on a partial skull from the early Permian of Texas. Additional material has been reported from the early Permian of New Mexico and Oklahoma. Urban et al. (2007) reported material attributed to Z. serratus from the late Carboniferous and the early Permian of West Virginia. This is the only record of Zatrachys in the Carboniferous.

Zatrachys microphthalmus is now placed within Dasyceps.

== Anatomy ==
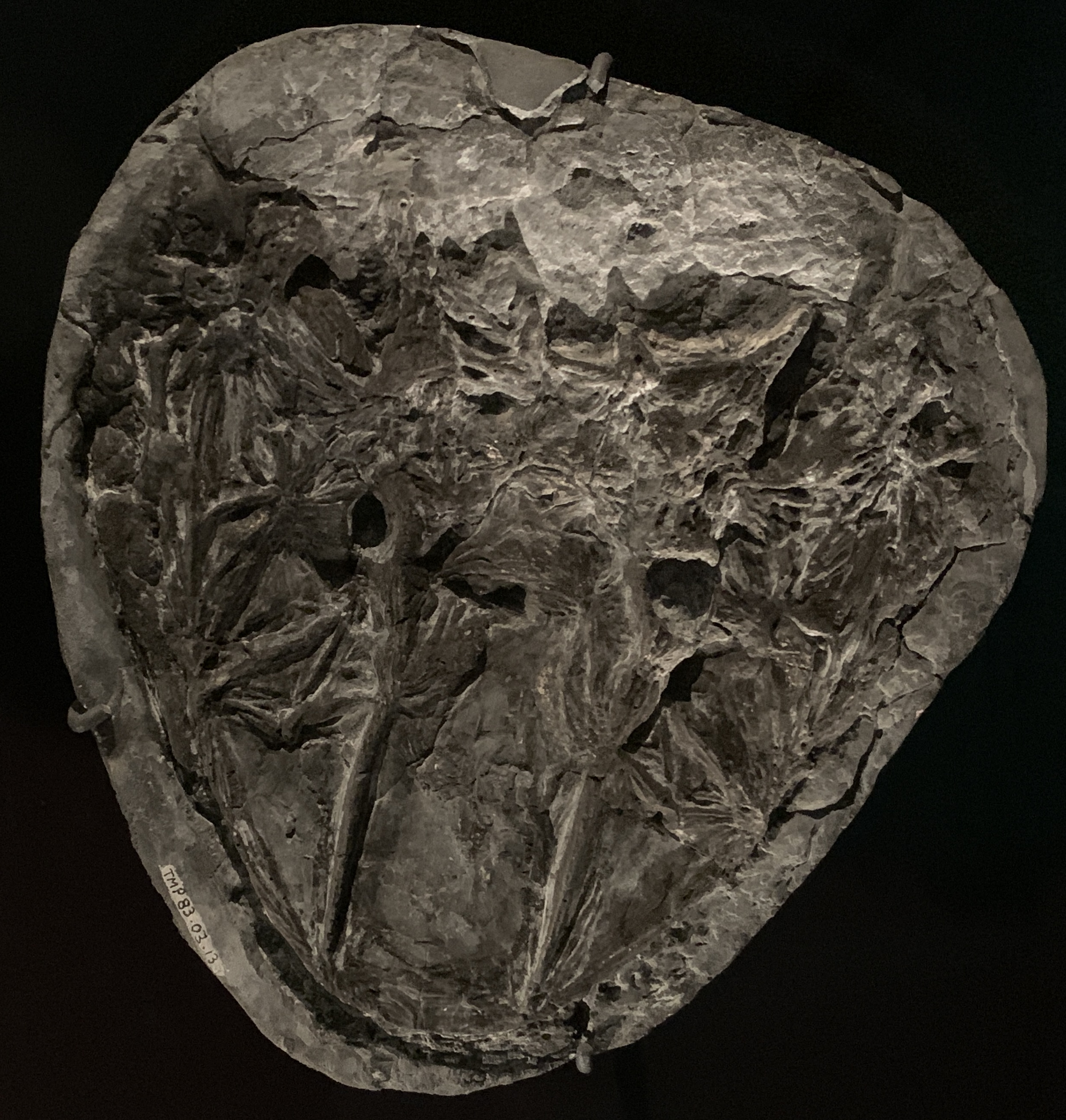
Zatrachys skull cast. At the Royal Tyrrell Museum of Palaeontology.

Like all zatracheids, Zatrachys is easily recognized by the presence of a large opening in the snout, the internarial fontanelle or fenestra. Of the three genera of zatracheids, that of Zatrachys is the largest, extending as far back as to fully divide the nasals and to partially divide the frontals, a unique feature (autapomorphy). Other features that distinguish this genus are the presence of prominent spiky projections from the posterior skull (maxilla and quadratojugal), bosses and ridges on the lower jaw, a supratemporal that borders the otic notch, long and slender tabular horns and short postparietal horns, contact between the palatine and the vomer to fully enclose the choana on the palate, and a U-shaped skull profile intermediate to that of Acanthostomatops (broad and parabolic) and Dasyceps (elongate).

Although there are numerous reports of postcranial material attributed to Zatrachys, all of this was referred to species that are now reassigned to other temnospondyl taxa (e.g., "Zatrachys crucifer") or material of other taxa that was mistakenly attributed to cranial material of Z. serratus due to close proximity during preservation (e.g., Platyhystrix). This often led to hypothesized close relationships with Platyhystrix in particular.
