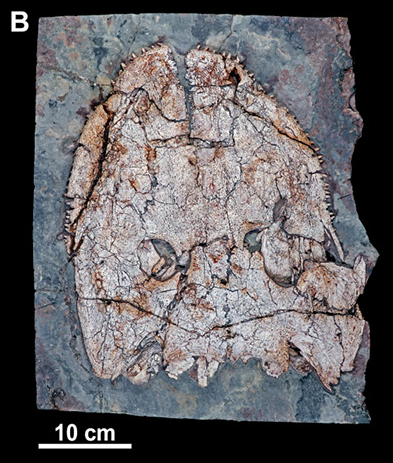
- Holotype specimen, NHMMZ/LS PW 2019/5025

Scientific classification
- Kingdom: Animalia
- Phylum: Chordata
- Clade: Tetrapoda
- Order: †Temnospondyli
- Family: †Eryopidae
- Genus: †Stenokranio; Werneburg et al., 2024
- Species: †S. boldi

Binomial name
- †Stenokranio boldi Werneburg et al., 2024

= Stenokranio =

Stenokranio Temporal range: Gzhelian–Asselian

Extinct genus of temnospondyls

Stenokranio (from the Greek στενός [stenos] for narrow and κρανίο [kranio] for skull) is a genus of eryopid temnospondyl from the Permo-Carboniferous Remigiusberg Formation of Germany. It is represented by the type species, Stenokranio boldi, which was named for two specimens collected from the Remigiusberg quarry near Kusel, Saar–Nahe Basin, southwest Germany.

== Description ==
The type and only species, S. boldi, is diagnosed by three autapomorphic features of the skull that differentiate it from all other eryopids: (1) the relatively narrow posterior skull table, therefore nearly parallel lateral margins of the skull; (2) the short postparietals and tabulars; and (3) the wide ectopterygoid. The two known skulls measure 24.7 centimetres (9.7 in) (holotype) and 27 centimetres (11 in) (paratype) and are thought to represent adult, though not fully mature, individuals. The holotype is represented by a nearly complete skull and mandibles, while the paratype is represented by a partial skull, mandible, and anterior postcrania. The holotype also preserves a few isolated bones associated with diadectomorphs and 'microsaurs,' although it is not clear that these represent consumed items. In general, the skulls preserve many of the features observed in other eryopids, such as a coarsely pitted ornamentation on the surface of the skull; prominent longitudinal ridges and some transverse ridges that frame depressions on the skull; and relatively thick cranial bones. The most distinctive feature of S. boldi is a proportionately narrow skull; rather than continually broadening posteriorly, the "cheek" (temporal) region of the skull in S. boldi is squared-off such that the margins run parallel to each other. It is differentiated from an isolated eryopid mandible previously reported from the site on the basis of tooth positions (48–50 in Stenokranio vs. 35–40 in the isolated mandible). The postcrania differ little from those previously described in the North American Eryops, which is the sister taxon of Stenokranio based upon phylogenetic analysis.

== Discovery and species ==
Stenokranio boldi is based on two specimens discovered in 2013 and 2018 from the Remigiusberg quarry in Rhineland-Palatinate. The quarry is a large open-cast mine that is mined for subvolcanic rock that is used in road and railroad gravel; this rock was formed from Permian-aged volcanic intrusions into rocks dated to between the latest Carboniferous and the earliest Permian (Gzhelian/Asselian) Remigiusberg Formation.

The taxon was named by paleontologists Ralf Werneburg (Naturhistorisches Museum Schloss Bertholdsburg Schleusingen), Florian Witzmann (Museum für Naturkunde Berlin), Larry Rinehart (New Mexico Museum of Natural History and Science), Jan Fischer (Urweltmuseum GEOSKOP/Burg Lichtenberg), and Sebastian Voigt (Urweltmuseum GEOSKOP/Burg Licthenberg) in the Journal of Paleontology. The species epithet honors Rudolf Bold who discovered the holotype of Cryptovenator hirschbergeri.

== Paleobiology ==
As with other eryopids, the exact paleobiology of Stenokranio is disputed; Werneburg et al. (2024) propose that it was semi-aquatic, capable of moving around on land in order to migrate between habitats while also being capable of catching, and primarily feeding on, aquatic prey items such as fish, similar to modern crocodilians. As with some eryopids such as Eryops, Stenokranio lacks lateral line grooves on the skull, which is typically regarded as evidence of relative terrestriality. Of interest is that the similarly large and semi-aquatic stereospondylomorph Sclerocephalus, which is abundantly known from Germany, is unknown from Remigiusberg. This indicates that these taxa may have had sufficient ecological overlap such that only one could be present in a given locality.

== Palaeoecology ==
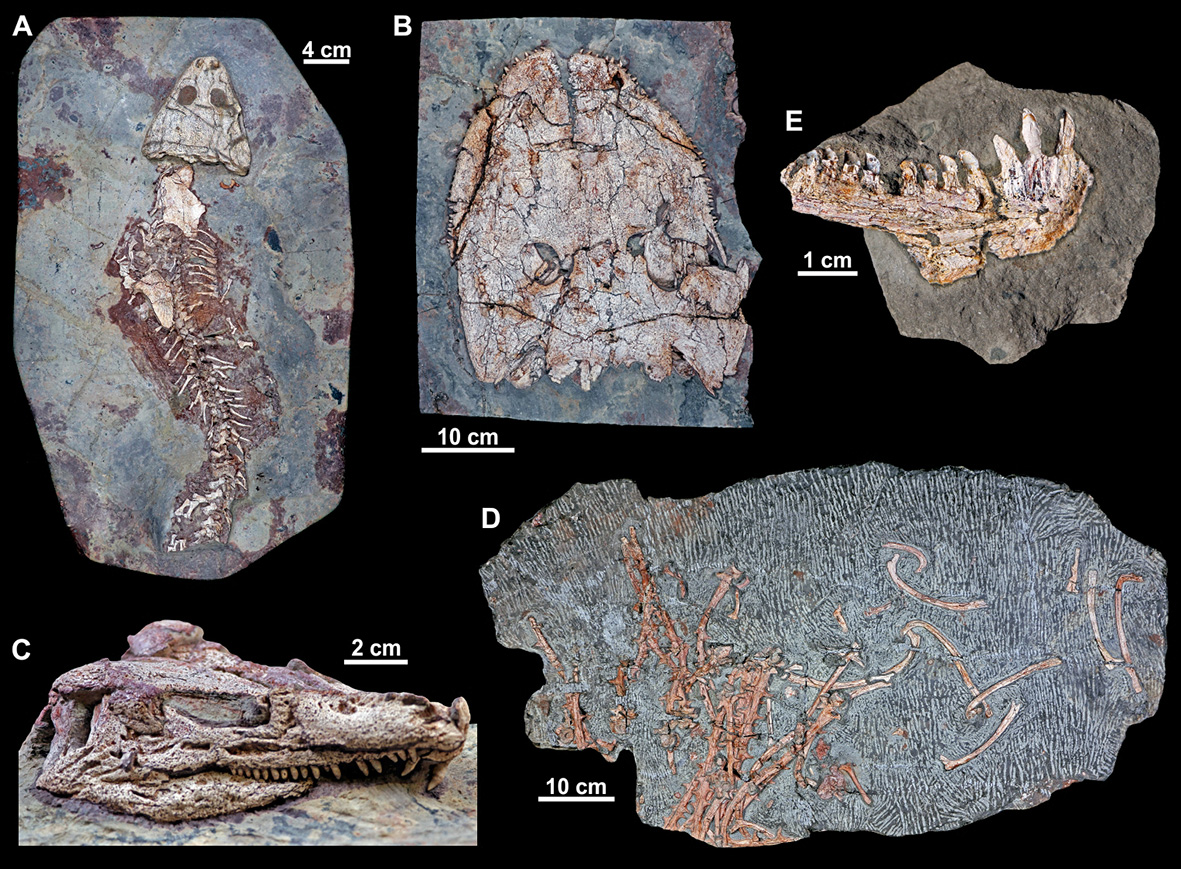
Fossils known from Remigiusberg Formation, Trypanognathus (A), Stenokranio (B), unnamed diadectomorph (C), Remigiomontanus (D), Cryptovenator (E).

Remigiusberg Formation has produced a diverse record of vertebrates, including a variety of fish, 'lepospondyls', a trimerorhachid dvinosaur (Trypanognathus remiguisbergensis), diadectomorphs, an edaphosaurid 'pelycosaur' (Remigiomontanus robustus), and a sphenacodontid 'pelycosaur' (Cryptovenator hirschbergeri). The jaw of another eryopid distinct from S. boldi was also recovered from the site, indicating the presence of at least two eryopids at the locality. The two specimens of S. boldi were recovered from different horizons at the locality and are thought to represent decomposed skeletons that were transported into the marginal lacustrine environment.
