= Osteophorus =

Osteophorus Temporal range: Permian, 298.9–254.0 Ma

Scientific classification
- Kingdom: Animalia
- Phylum: Chordata
- Clade: Tetrapoda
- Order: †Temnospondyli
- Family: †Eryopidae
- Genus: †Osteophorus; Meyer, 1856

Type species
- †Osteophorus roemeri Meyer, 1856

Extinct genus of amphibians

Osteophorus is an extinct genus of eryopoidean temnospondyl within the family Eryopidae. It is only known from the Permian of Poland.

== See also ==
- Prehistoric amphibian
- List of prehistoric amphibians
