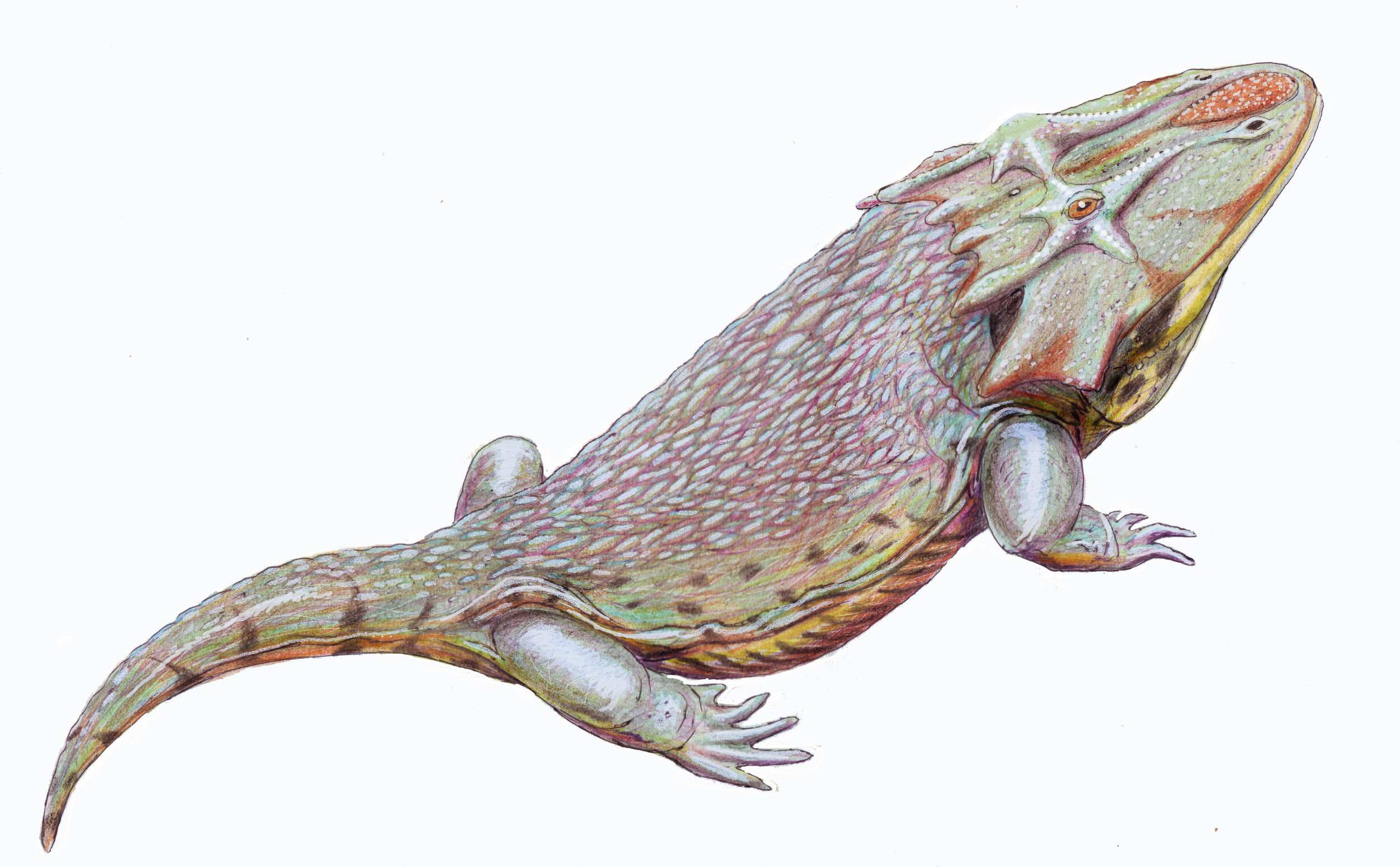
- Dasyceps bucklandi

Scientific classification
- Domain: Eukaryota
- Kingdom: Animalia
- Phylum: Chordata
- Order: †Temnospondyli
- Family: †Zatracheidae
- Genus: †Dasyceps; Huxley, 1859

Type species
- †Labyrinthodon bucklandi Lloyd, 1850

Synonyms
- Labyrinthodon bucklandi

= Dasyceps =

Dasyceps Temporal range: Early Permian

Extinct genus of amphibians

Dasyceps is an extinct genus of zatracheidid temnospondyl from the early Permian of England.

== History of study ==
Dasyceps was originally named in 1850 for the type species, D. bucklandi, which honors English paleontologist William Buckland, but under the now defunct genus "Labyrinthodon," which is now regarded as a junior synonym of the Triassic capitosaur Mastodonsaurus. The new genus name for the species was created by Thomas Huxley in 1859. A detailed description of the taxon was given in German by the German paleontologist Friedrich von Huene in 1910. The most recent description is that of Paton (1975). A second species from Texas, D. microphthalmus, was originally named as a species of Zatrachys but was moved to Dasyceps by Paton (1975).

== Anatomy ==
Dasyceps is the largest of the three zatracheidid genera, with a skull length approaching 30 cm. It is diagnosed by the following features: (1) proportionately long, U-shaped skull and elongate premaxillae; (2) relatively posteriorly situated nares; (3) dorsal exposure of septomaxilla replaced by nasal and maxilla, which contact posterior to the naris, excluding the lacrimal; (4) quadratojugal expanded but without spikes; (5) tabular posteriorly expanded; (6) long suture between squamosal and tabular. Compared to other zatracheidids, the internarial fontanelle of D. bucklandi forms a nearly perfect teardrop-shaped opening that divides the nasals more than in Acanthostomatops but that does not divide the frontals as is found in Zatrachys.

Dasyceps bucklandi is only known from a holotype skull split into a part and counterpart block. Dasyceps microphthalmus is known from the holotype and two referred specimens.
