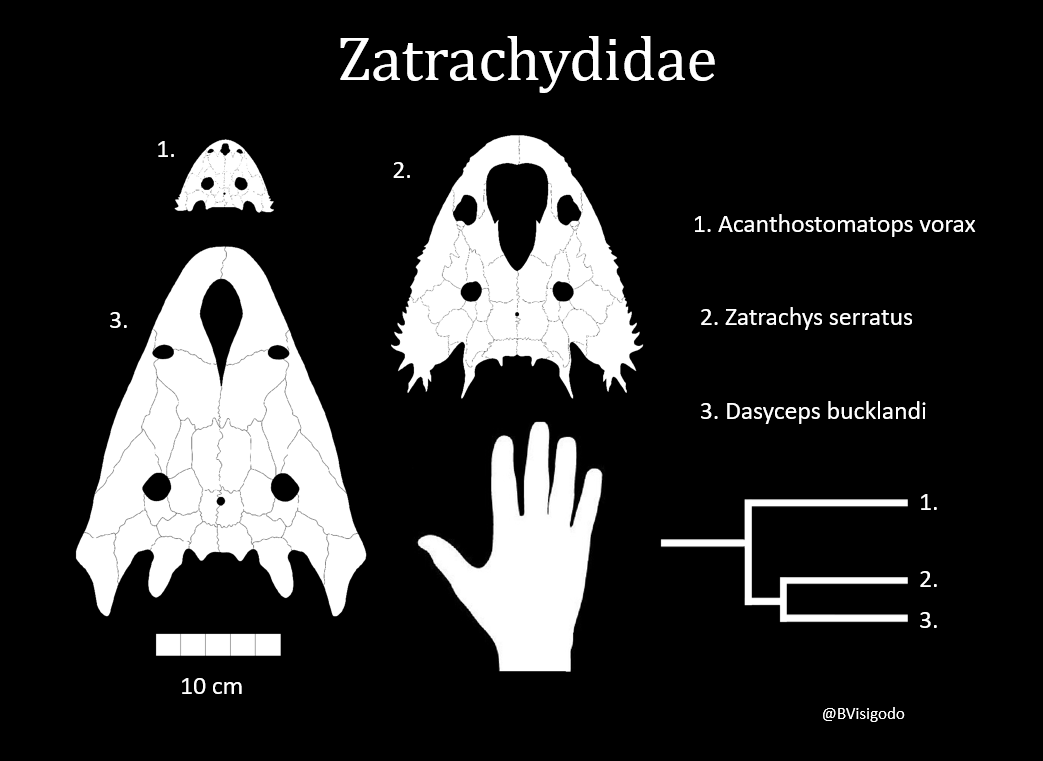
- Diagram of zatracheid skulls

Scientific classification
- Domain: Eukaryota
- Kingdom: Animalia
- Phylum: Chordata
- Order: †Temnospondyli
- Superfamily: †Eryopoidea
- Family: †Zatracheidae; Cope, 1882

Genera
- Acanthostomatops; Chemnitzion; Dasyceps; Zatrachys

Synonyms
- Synonyms: Acanthostomidae; Acanthostomatidae; Acanthostomatopsidae; Zatrachydae; Zatrachidae; Zatrachydidae

= Zatracheidae =

Extinct family of temnospondyls

Zatracheidae (sometimes mistakenly spelled Zatrachydidae or Zatrachysdidae) is a family of Late Carboniferous and Early Permian temnospondyls known from North America and Europe. Zatracheidids are distinguished by lateral (sideways) bony protuberances of the quadratojugal bone of the skull, and a large opening in the snout called the internarial fontanelle (sometimes the internarial fenestra) that is bordered by enlarged premaxillae. The skull is flattened, with small orbits or eye sockets set far back. The opening in the snout may have housed a gland for producing a sticky substance so that prey would adhere to the tongue. If so, this indicates that these animals spent a large part of their time on land.

== History of study ==
There are three genera of zatracheidids: Acanthostomatops Kuhn, 1961; Dasyceps Huxley 1859; and Zatrachys Cope, 1878. Only Dascyeps is represented by a species in addition to the type species. The name Zatracheidae was first coined by Cope (1882). Numerous variations on this, such as 'Zatrachydae' and 'Zatrachydidae' have been used in the literature, as have permutations derived from Acanthostomatops such as 'Acanthostomidae.'

== Anatomy ==
Zatracheidids are recognized by their wide and flat skulls with a greatly enlarged preorbital region that is distinguished by the large internarial fontanelle, with corresponding large premaxillae. A correspondingly large intervomerine fontanelle is found on the palate. The quadratojugal is expanded, and in Acanthostomatops and Zatrachys, bears discrete spiky projections. The quadratojugal also obscures the quadrate in dorsal profile. Dasyceps and Zatrachys are only confidently known from cranial material.

== Development ==
Zatracheidids are one of several temnospondyl groups that are speculated to have undergone metamorphosis from young to adult. Both Zatrachys and Acanthostomatops are known from ontogenetic series, but that of Acanthostomatops is more complete and is the only one that would definitively capture metamorphosis. Spikes developed during metamorphosis, and as zatrachydids continued growing as adults, the pits and grooves on their skulls grew more extensive and the otic notch at the back of the skull grew wider. These notches likely supported membranes called tympana, which serve as ear drums in living amphibians. The choanae also grew larger during metamorphosis, and are distinguished by their irregular shape, which differs from the more circular shape seen in other temnospondyls. Zatrachydids also possess a hole in the center of their palates called the inter-vomerine fontanelle, which grows larger during metamorphosis. This hole is seen in living salamanders and frogs and is associated with an organ called the intermaxillary gland, which produces secretions that make the tongue sticky. It may also have been present in zatrachydids.

== Gallery ==
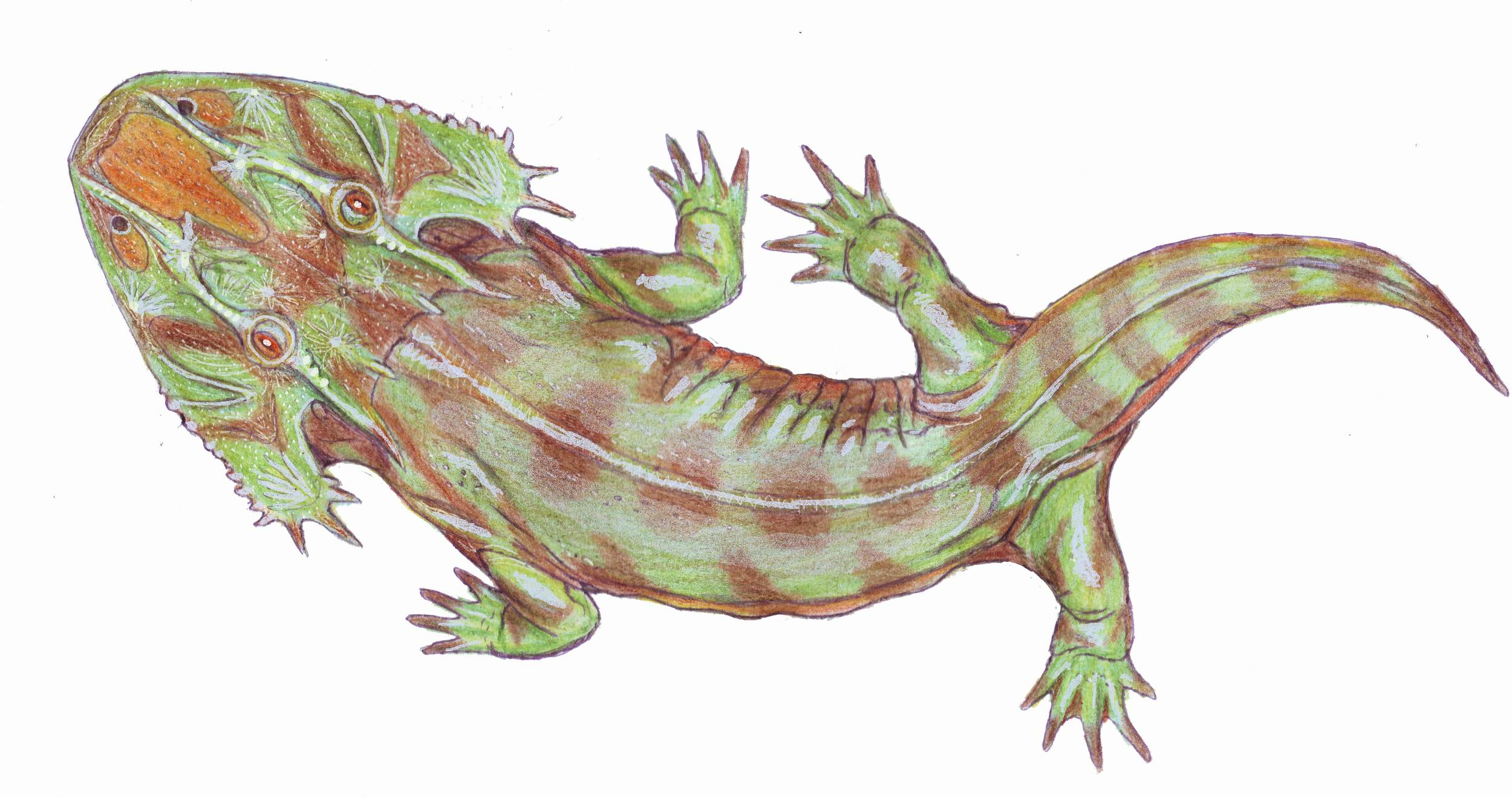
Zatrachys serratus, of the late Carboniferous and early Permian of North America

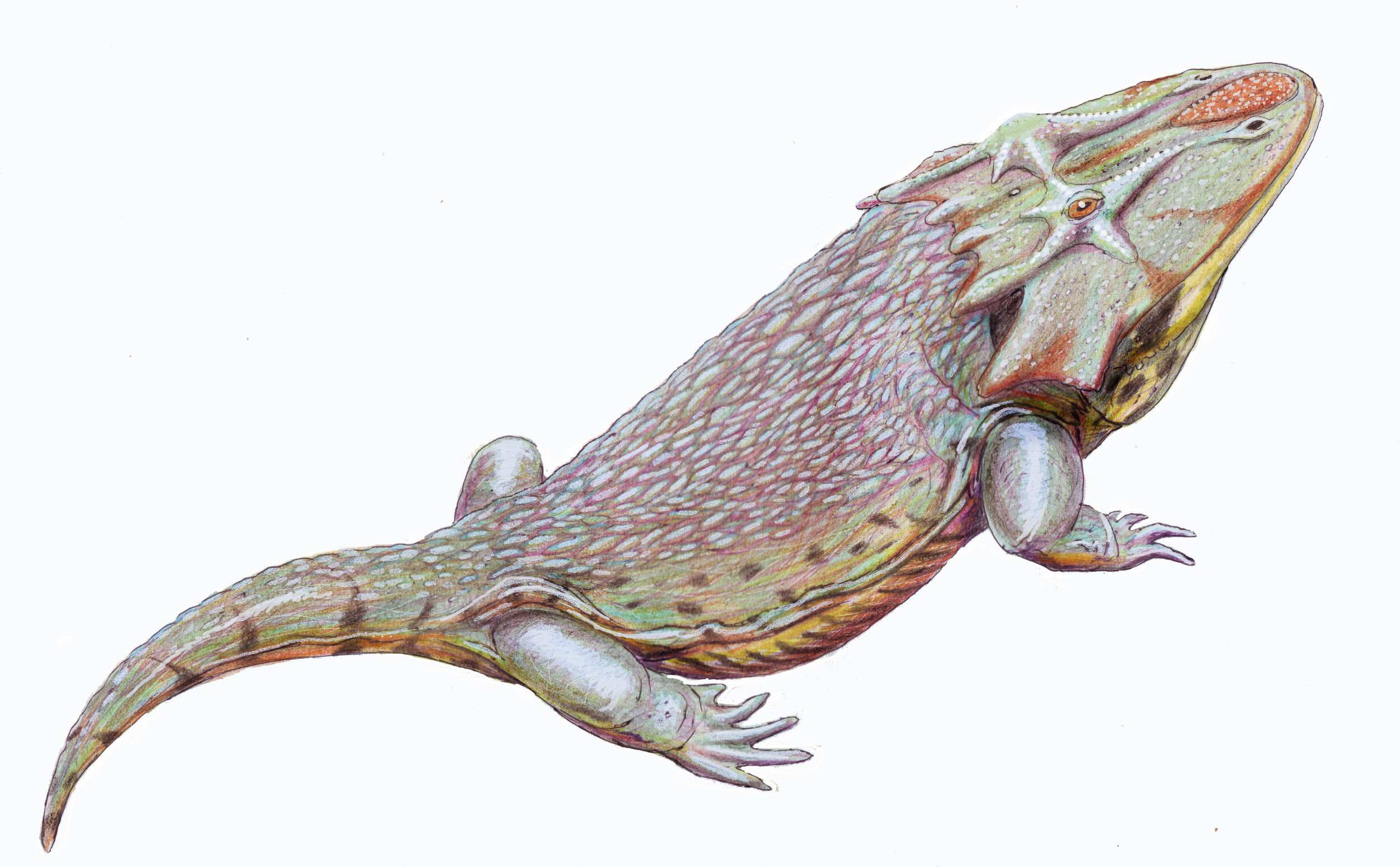
Dasyceps bucklandi, of the early Permian of England

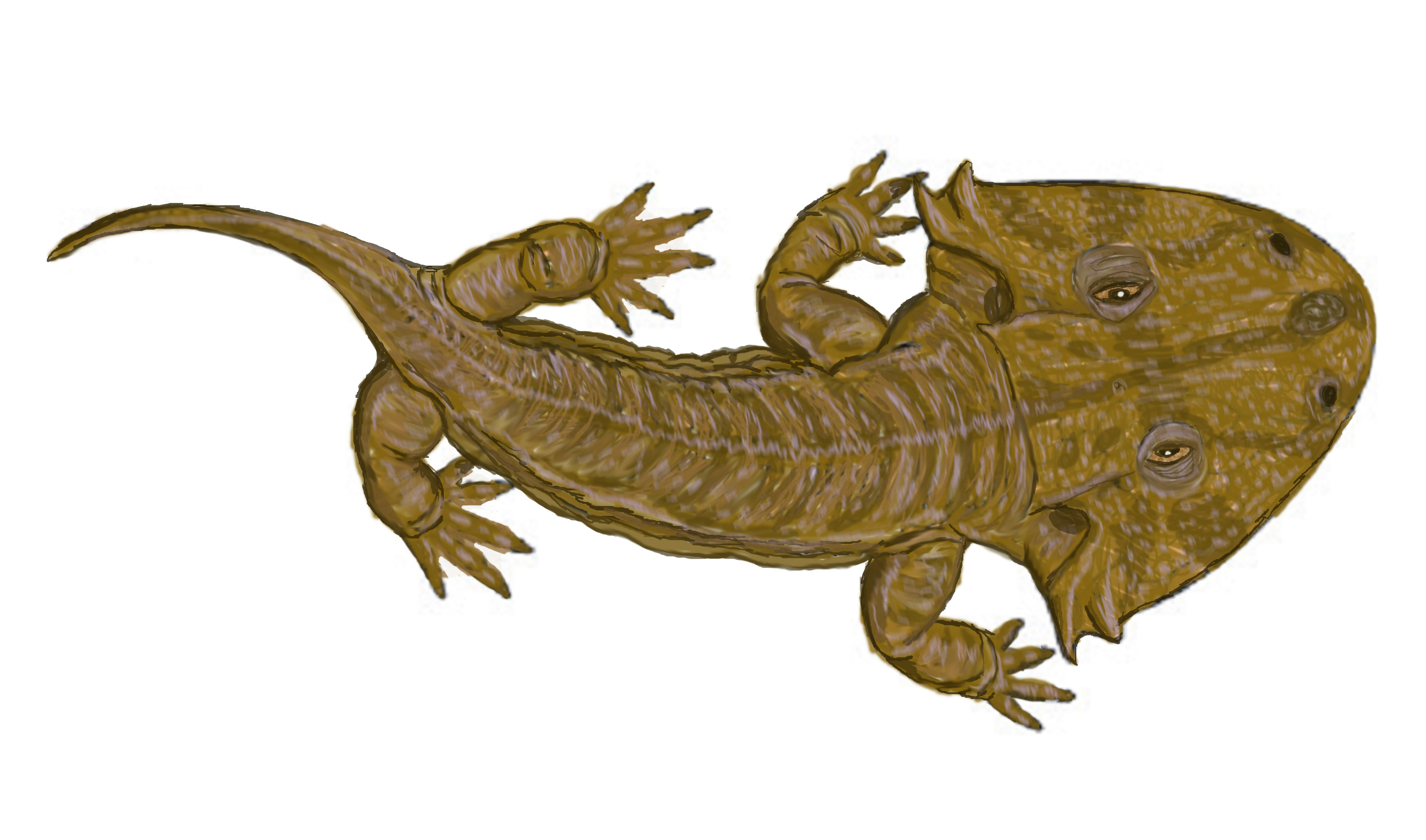
Acanthostomatops vorax, of the early Permian of Germany
