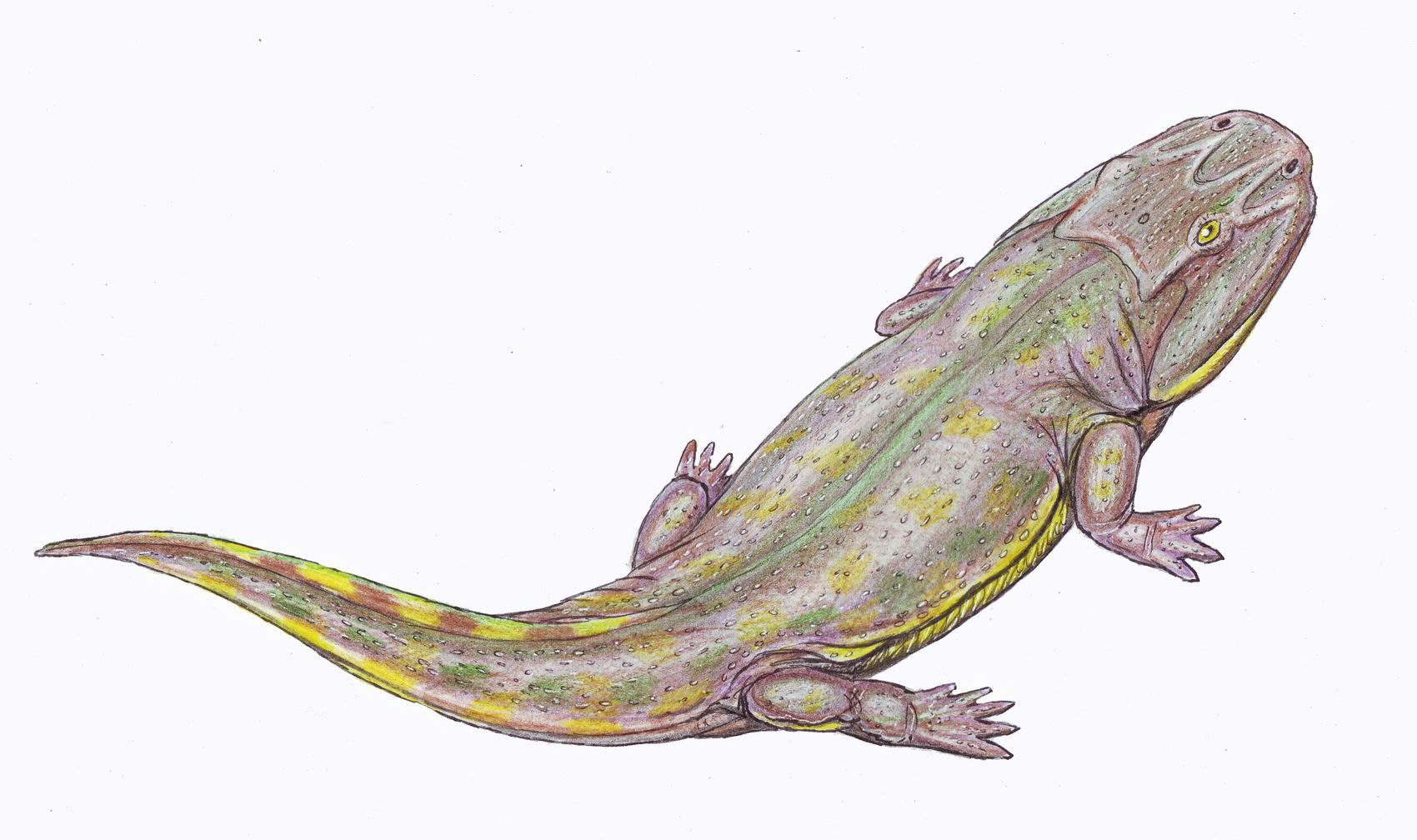

Scientific classification
- Kingdom: Animalia
- Phylum: Chordata
- Clade: Tetrapoda
- Order: †Temnospondyli
- Family: †Eryopidae
- Genus: †Clamorosaurus; Gubin, 1983

Type species
- †Clamorosaurus nocturnus Gubin, 1983

Other species
- †Clamorosaurus borealis Gubin, 1983

= Clamorosaurus =

Clamorosaurus Temporal range: Permian 272.5 Ma

Extinct genus of amphibians

Clamorosaurus is an extinct genus of temnospondyl amphibian. Fossils of Clamorosaurus have been found in the Inta Formation (Vorkuta series) in Russia. They are dated to about 272.5 million years ago, which was during the Ufimian interval of the Permian.

Clamorosaurus had a skull length of about 23 cm. (9 inches). The vacuities between the pterygoid bones of Clamorosaurus were rounded at the front. The external nares were large. Both of these characteristics are features of all members of Eryopidae.
