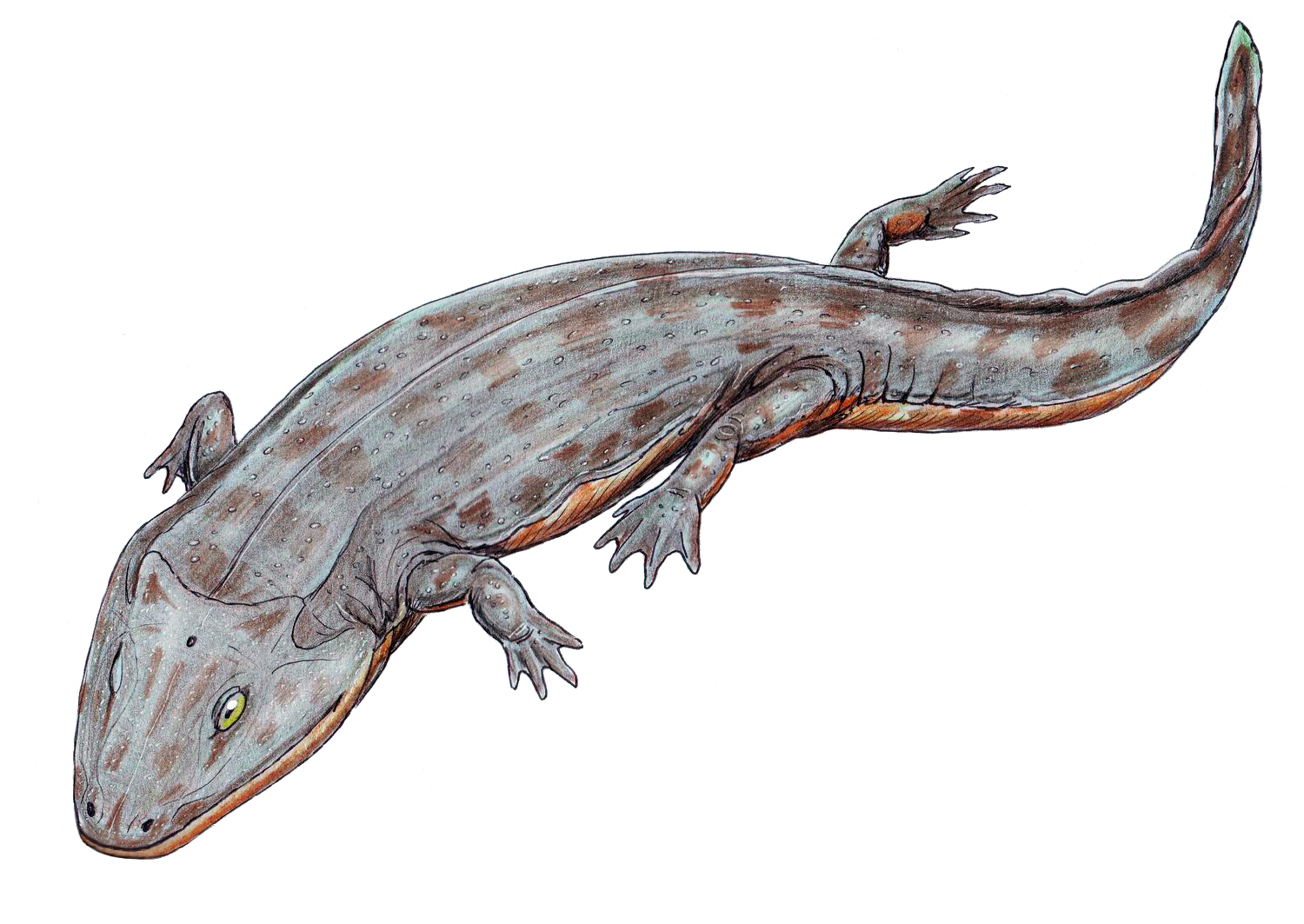
- Iberospondylus schultzei

Scientific classification
- Kingdom: Animalia
- Phylum: Chordata
- Clade: Stegocephali
- Clade: Tetrapoda
- Order: †Temnospondyli
- Genus: †Iberospondylus; Laurina & Soler-Gijóna, 2001

Type species
- †Iberospondylus schultzei Laurina & Soler-Gijóna, 2001

= Iberospondylus =

Iberospondylus Temporal range: Stephanian ~302 Ma

Extinct genus of amphibians

Iberospondylus is an extinct genus of basal temnospondyl amphibian which lived in a marine environment. The type material was found in the Emma Quarry Amphibian Bed of the Puertollano Basin, Ciudad Real province, southern Spain and extended the record for temnospondyls on the peninsula by 45 million years. Along with the holotype, a skull with several disarticulated vertebrae and ribs, two other partial skeletons are known. The name is derived from "Iberia" name of the peninsula where Spain is located, plus "spodylos", Greek for vertebra. The species name is in honor of Dr. Hans-Peter Schultze.

Skull of Iberospondylus schultzei, holotype of the species
