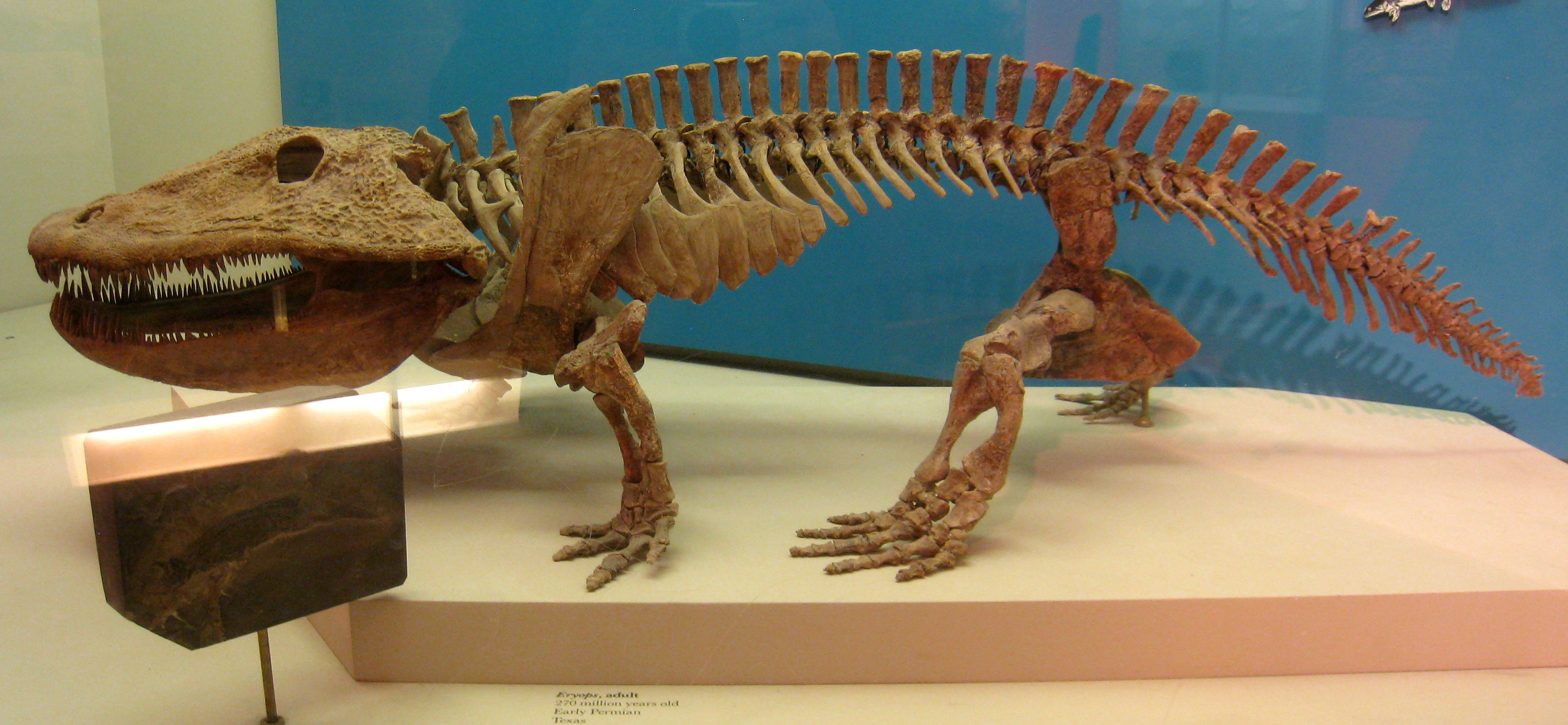
- Cast of a skeleton of Eryops megacephalus, National Museum of Natural History

Scientific classification
- Kingdom: Animalia
- Phylum: Chordata
- Clade: Tetrapoda
- Order: †Temnospondyli
- Superfamily: †Eryopoidea
- Family: †Eryopidae; Cope, 1882

Genera
- Actinodon; ?Chelydosaurus; ?Syndyodosuchus; Stenokranio; Eryopinae Schoch & Milner, 2014; Clamorosaurus; Eryops; Glaukerpeton; Onchiodon; Osteophorus

= Eryopidae =

Eryopidae Temporal range: Pennsylvanian- Early Permian, 300–272.5 Ma

Extinct family of temnospondyls

Eryopidae are an extinct family of medium to large sized amphibious temnospondyls that lived from the latest Carboniferous (Pennsylvanian) to the early Permian period and inhabited North America and Europe. They were apex predators in the stream and lake habitats they inhabited. Their life cycle (exemplified by Onchiodon) consist of a small larvae that grows into a heavily ossified adult. This group are unusual in their variability in their morphology and development.

They have interpterygoid vacuities (spaces in the interpterygoid bone) that are rounded at the front and large external nares.

Clamorosaurus and Syndyodosuchus appear to be amongst the last members of Eryopidae.

Not all of the genera previously included in the Eryopidae (Carroll 1988) are retained under the cladistic revisions.

== Distribution ==
They had a broad geographic range inhabiting much of the northern regions of the supercontinent Pangea in what would become North America and the eastern margins of Europe.

In Texas, many fossils of Eryops have been found. There are also a few genera of European Eryopsids distributed throughout. Fossils have been found in France (Actinodon), Germany (Onchiodon and Stenokranio), Czech Republic (Onchiodon), Poland (Osteophorus) and in Pechora Basin, Russia (Clamorosaurus).

== Taxonomy ==
Eryopidae is a member of Eryopiformes along with Stereospondylomorpha. Below is a list of genera that belongs to this family and the subfamily Eryopinae:

- Actinodon
- ?Chelydosaurus
- ?Syndyodosuchus (possibly a Actinodontid)
- Stenokranio

Eryopinae

- Clamorosaurus
- Eryops
- Glaukerpeton
- Onchiodon
- Osteophorus

== Gallery ==
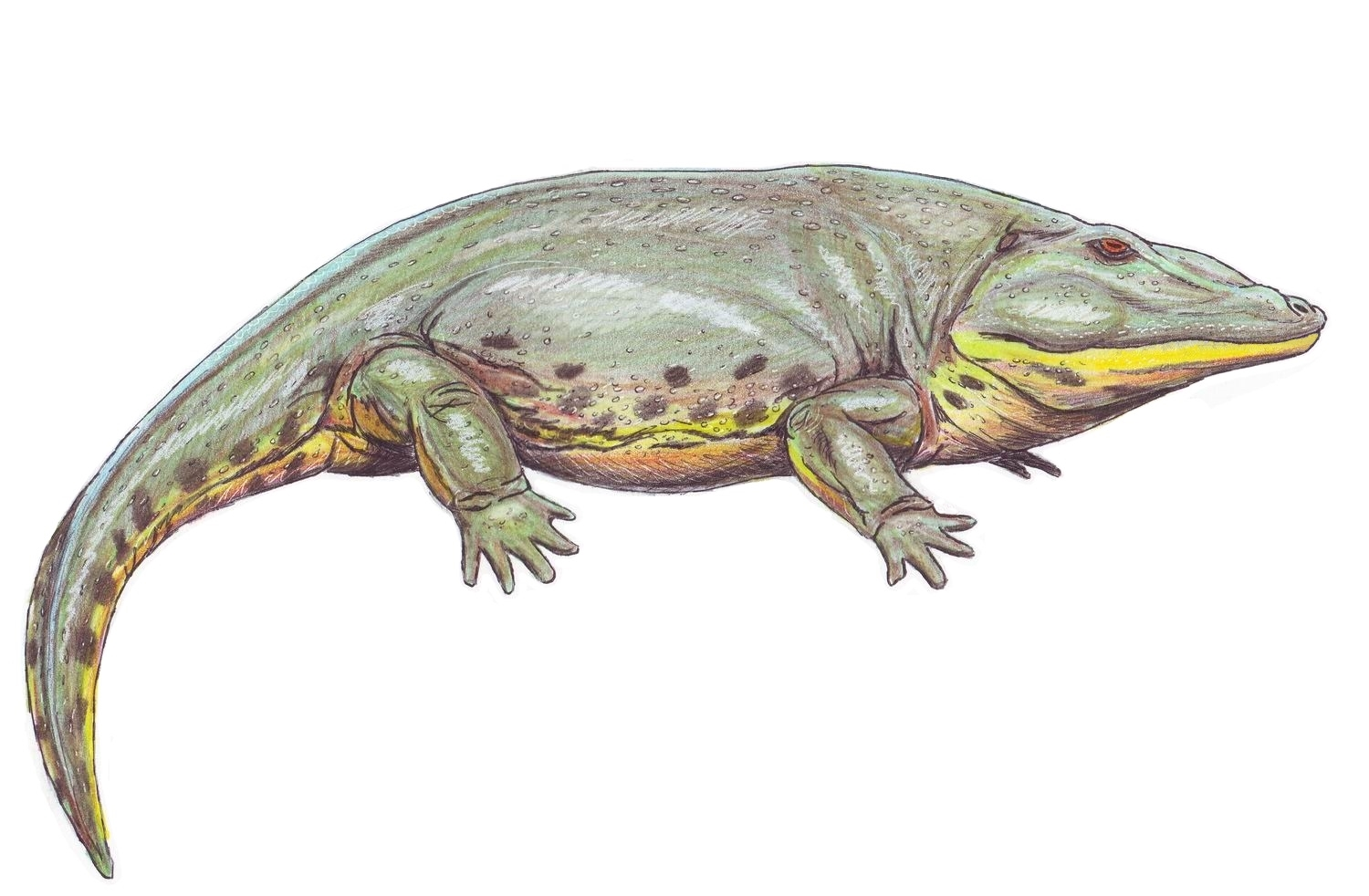
Eryops megacephalus, of the late Carboniferous to early Permian of North America

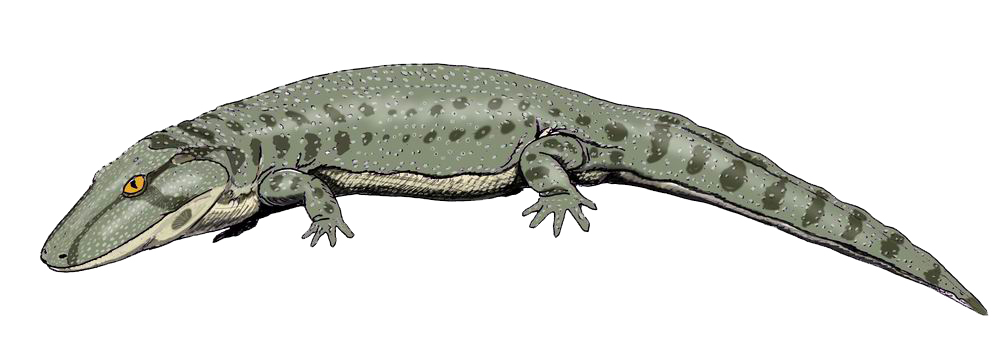
Onchiodon, of the late Carboniferous to early Permian of Europe and North America

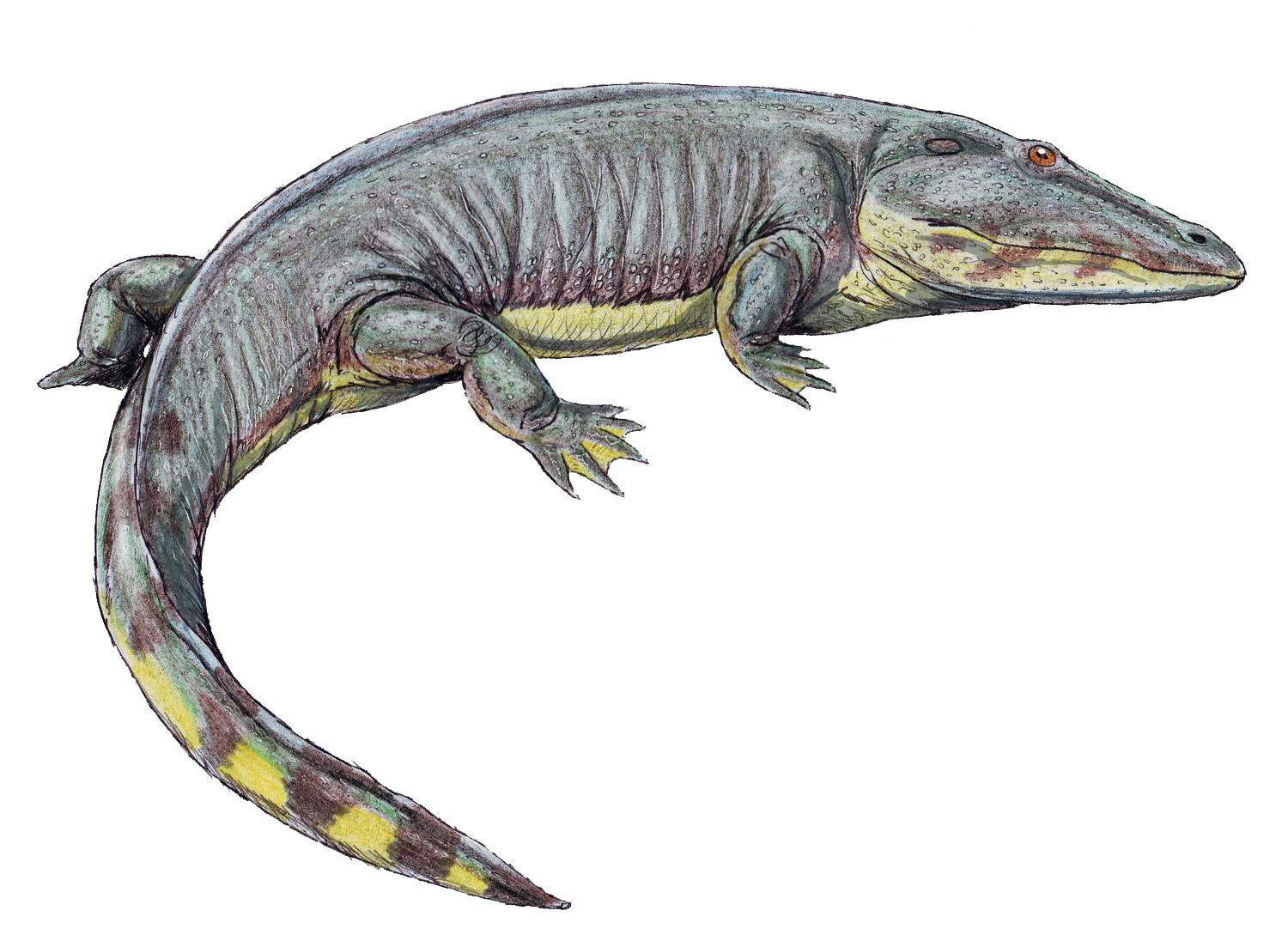
Actinodon frossardi, of the early Permian of France

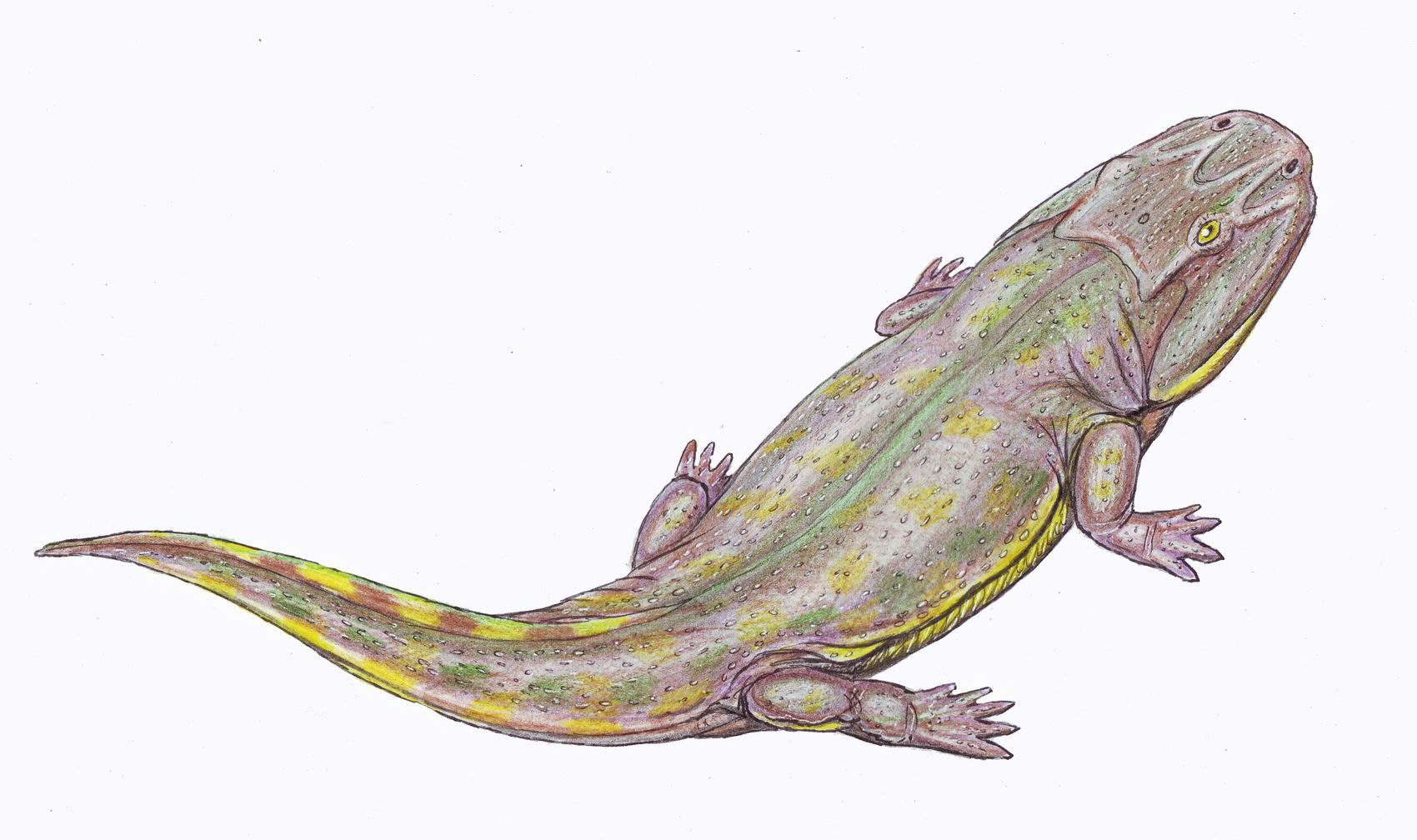
Clamorosaurus nocturnis, of the early Permian of Russia
