= Onchiodon =

Onchiodon Temporal range: Permian, 298.9–290.1 Ma

Scientific classification
- Kingdom: Animalia
- Phylum: Chordata
- Clade: Tetrapoda
- Order: †Temnospondyli
- Family: †Eryopidae
- Genus: †Onchiodon; Geinitz, 1861

Extinct genus of amphibians

Onchiodon is an extinct genus of temnospondyl. It is primarily known from the Carboniferous and Permian of Europe, but also from the Permian of North America. It was an amphibious carnivore.

A number of species have been described:

- Onchiodon credneri Fritsch, 1901
- Onchiodon labyrinthicus Geinitz, 1861 – type species
- Onchiodon langenhani Werneburg, 1989
- Onchiodon manebachensis Langenhan, 1909
- Onchiodon thuringiensis Werneburg, 2008

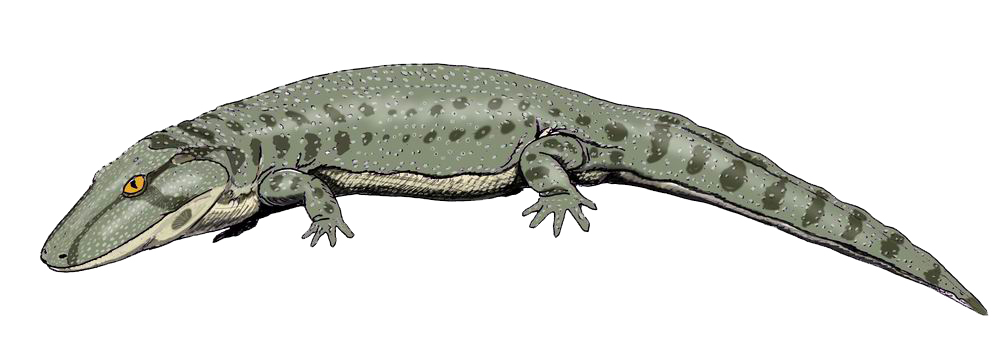
Life restoration
