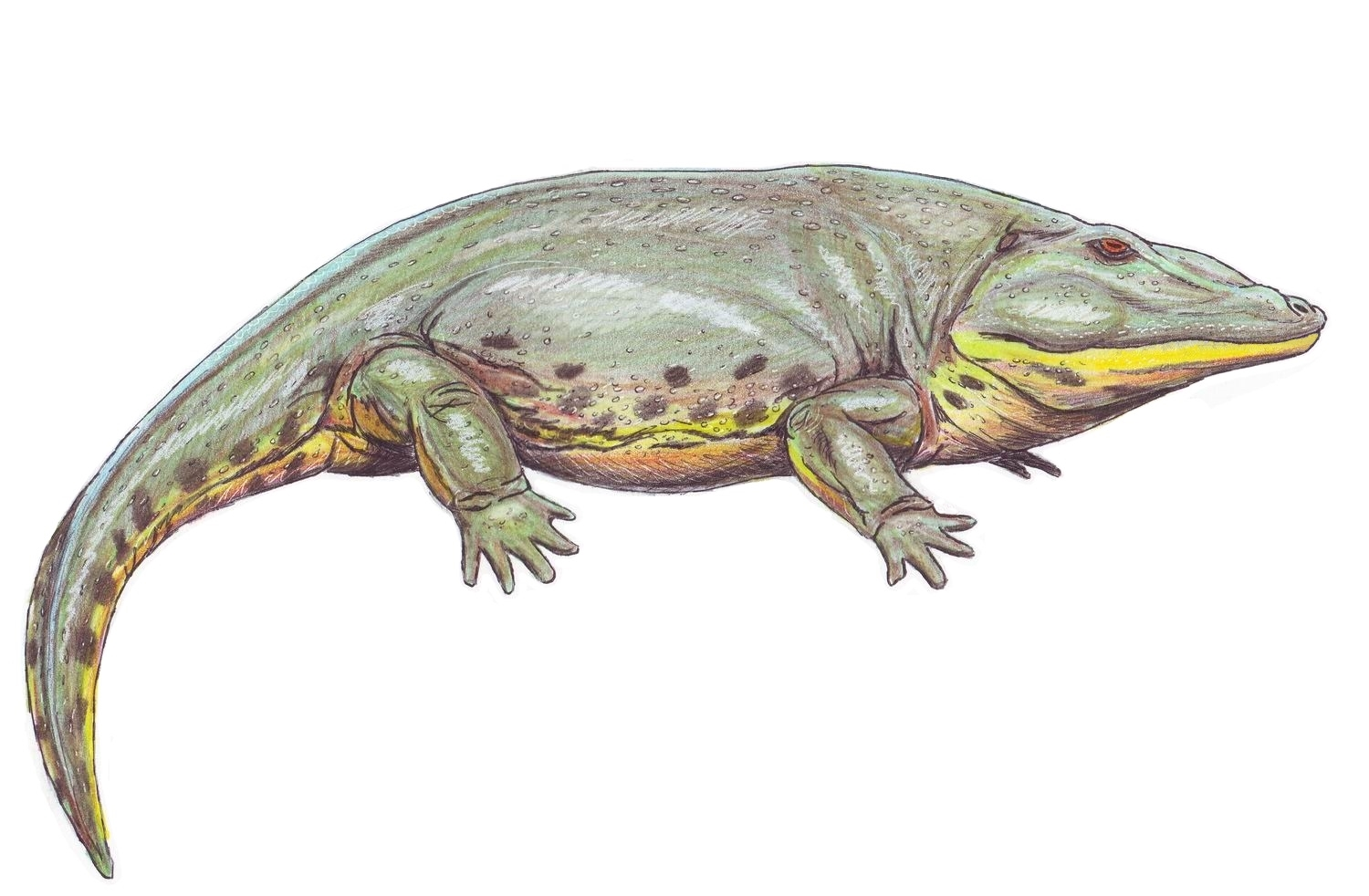
- Life restoration of Eryops megacephalus

Scientific classification
- Domain: Eukaryota
- Kingdom: Animalia
- Phylum: Chordata
- Order: †Temnospondyli
- Suborder: †Euskelia
- Superfamily: †Eryopoidea; Cope, 1882

Families
- †Eryopidae; †Parioxyidae; †Zatrachydidae

= Eryopoidea =

Eryopoidea Temporal range: Pennsylvanian - Permian, 300–272.5 Ma

Extinct superfamily of amphibians

Eryopoidea is a clade of late Carboniferous and Permian temnospondyl amphibians, known from North America and Europe. Carroll (1998) includes no fewer than ten families, but Yates and Warren (2000) replaced this with a cladistic approach that includes three closely related families, the Eryopidae, Parioxyidae and Zatrachydidae. They define the Eryopoidea as all members of Euskelia in which the choana are relatively rounded and the iliac blade is vertical. A similar definition (without specifically naming Euskelia) is provided by Laurin and Steyer (2000).
