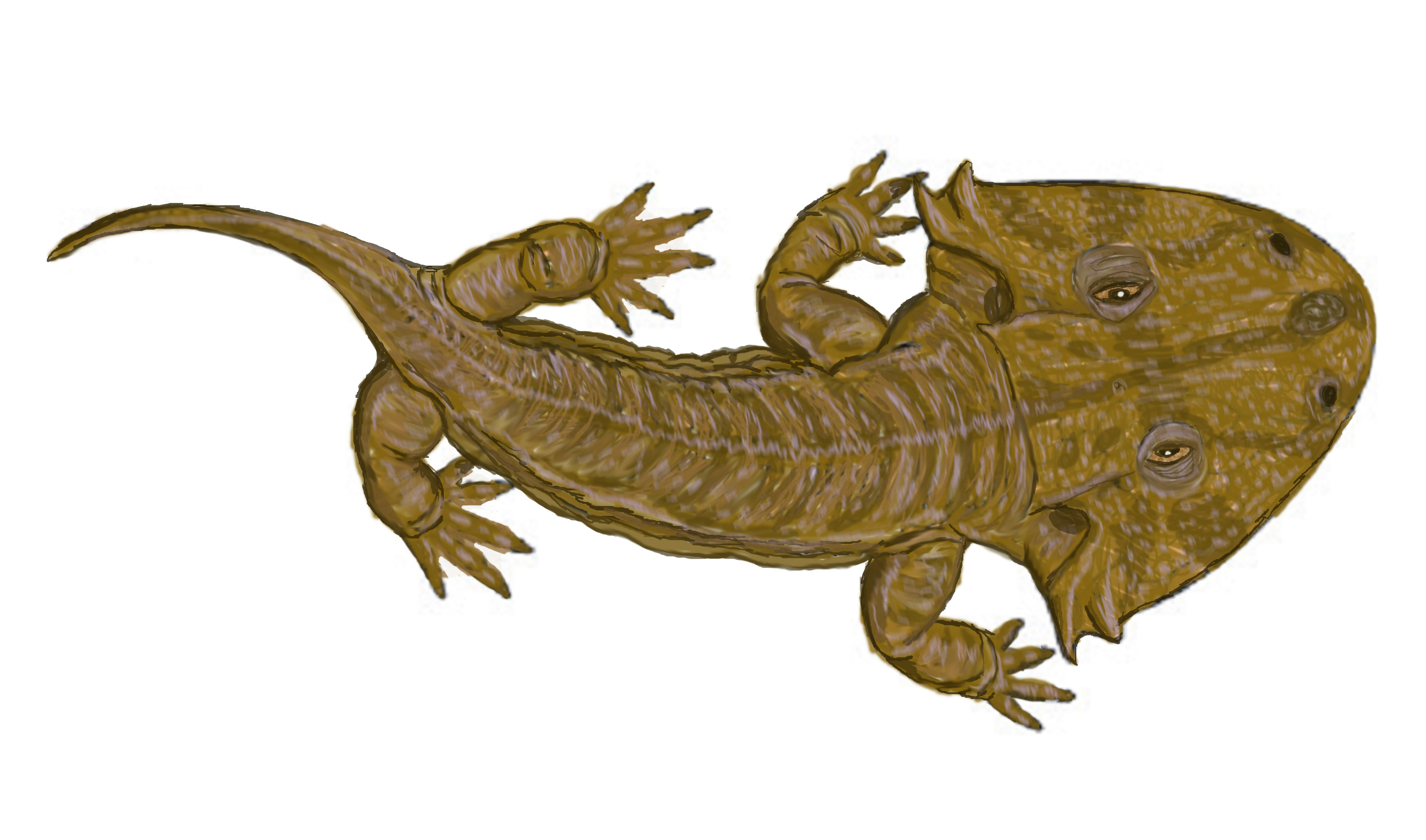
- Restoration of Acanthostomatops vorax

Scientific classification
- Domain: Eukaryota
- Kingdom: Animalia
- Phylum: Chordata
- Order: †Temnospondyli
- Family: †Zatracheidae
- Genus: †Acanthostomatops; Kuhn, 1961

Type species
- †Acanthostoma vorax Credner, 1883

Synonyms
- Melanerpeton spiniceps Geinitz & Deichmüller, 1882

= Acanthostomatops =

Acanthostomatops Temporal range: Early Permian ~295–290 Ma

Extinct genus of amphibians

Acanthostomatops is an extinct genus of zatracheidid temnospondyl from the Lower Permian Döhlen Basin of Saxony.

== History of study ==
Acanthostomatops was originally named as the type species Acanthostoma vorax, in 1883. However, the genus name Acanthostoma was previously used for a polychaete worm back in 1813, and the present name was given in 1961. Detailed descriptions of the taxon were given by Steen & Brough (1937), with an emphasis on the ontogeny of the taxon based on the large sample size given by Boy (1989) and Witzmann & Schoch (2006). Werneburg (1998) described a larval specimen of A. vorax, but this was later proven to be a specimen of the micromelerpetid Branchierpeton amblystomum.

== Anatomy ==
Acanthostomatops is diagnosed by six features: (1) lacrimal and prefrontal projecting into orbital; (2) quadratojugal with two lateral spikes; (3) choana laterally constricted by palatal tusk sockets; (4) small, rectangular interclavicle; (5) large and robust humerus present in larval stages; (6) 21-22 presacral vertebrae positions. Compared to the other zatracheidids, it has the proportionately widest skull and the smallest internarial fontanelle, which only slightly divides the nasals. it also lacks posteriorly extensive tabular horns and postparietal horns. It is also the only zatracheidid with definitively known postcranial material.

== Development ==
Over 30 specimens of A. vorax are known from the type locality near Dresden. The ontogenetic changes have been described in detail most recently by Witzmann & Schoch (2006). Among the changes that occur are a proportional shortening of the femur and the trunk relative to the skull and a distinct remodeling of the hyobranchial apparatus, with resorption of the larval form's ceratobranchials and the formation of a complex apparatus of hypobranchials that the authors suggested was for supporting the tongue. Based on the changes to the skeleton and the distribution of size classes within the locality, Witzmann & Schoch (2006) suggested that A. vorax had a biphasic life history, with an aquatic larval to juvenile form and a terrestrial adult form.
