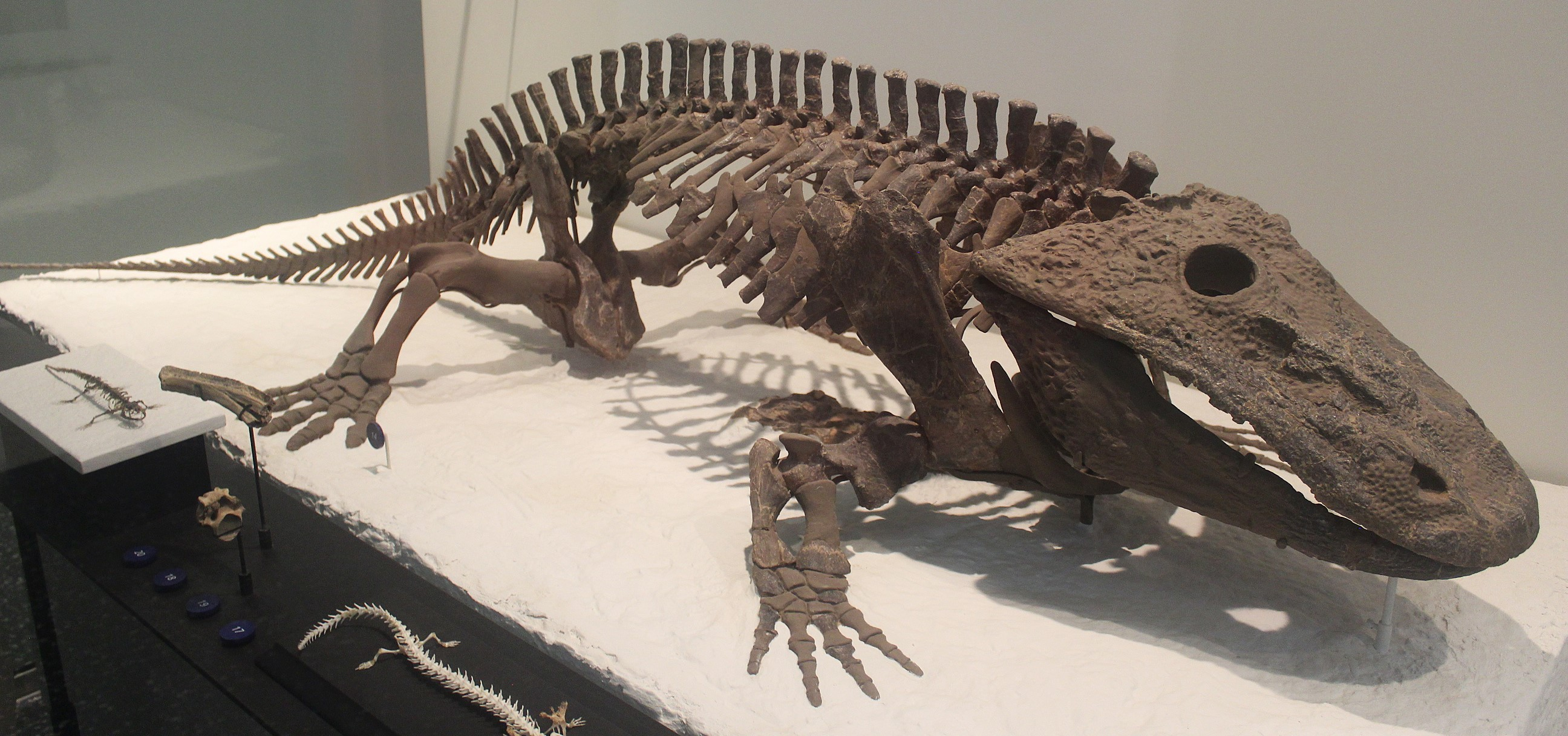
- Skeleton of Eryops megacephalus at the American Museum of Natural History

Scientific classification
- Kingdom: Animalia
- Phylum: Chordata
- Clade: Tetrapoda
- Order: †Temnospondyli
- Family: †Eryopidae
- Genus: †Eryops; Cope, 1877
- Species: †E. megacephalus

Binomial name
- †Eryops megacephalus Cope, 1877

= Eryops =

Eryops Temporal range: Pennsylvanian to Cisuralian (Gzhelian to Kungurian), 303–275 Ma

Species of amphibian

Eryops (/ˈɛri.ɒps/; from Greek ἐρύειν, eryein, 'drawn-out' + ὤψ, ops, 'face', because most of its skull was in front of its eyes) is a genus of extinct, amphibious temnospondyls. It contains the type species Eryops megacephalus, the fossils of which are found mainly in early Permian deposits of the Texas Red Beds, and Eryops grandis from New Mexico. Fossils have also been found in late Carboniferous rocks from New Mexico and early Permian deposits of Oklahoma, Utah, the Pittsburgh tri-state region, and Prince Edward Island. Several complete skeletons of Eryops have been found in lower Permian rocks, but skull bones and teeth are its most common fossils.

== Description ==
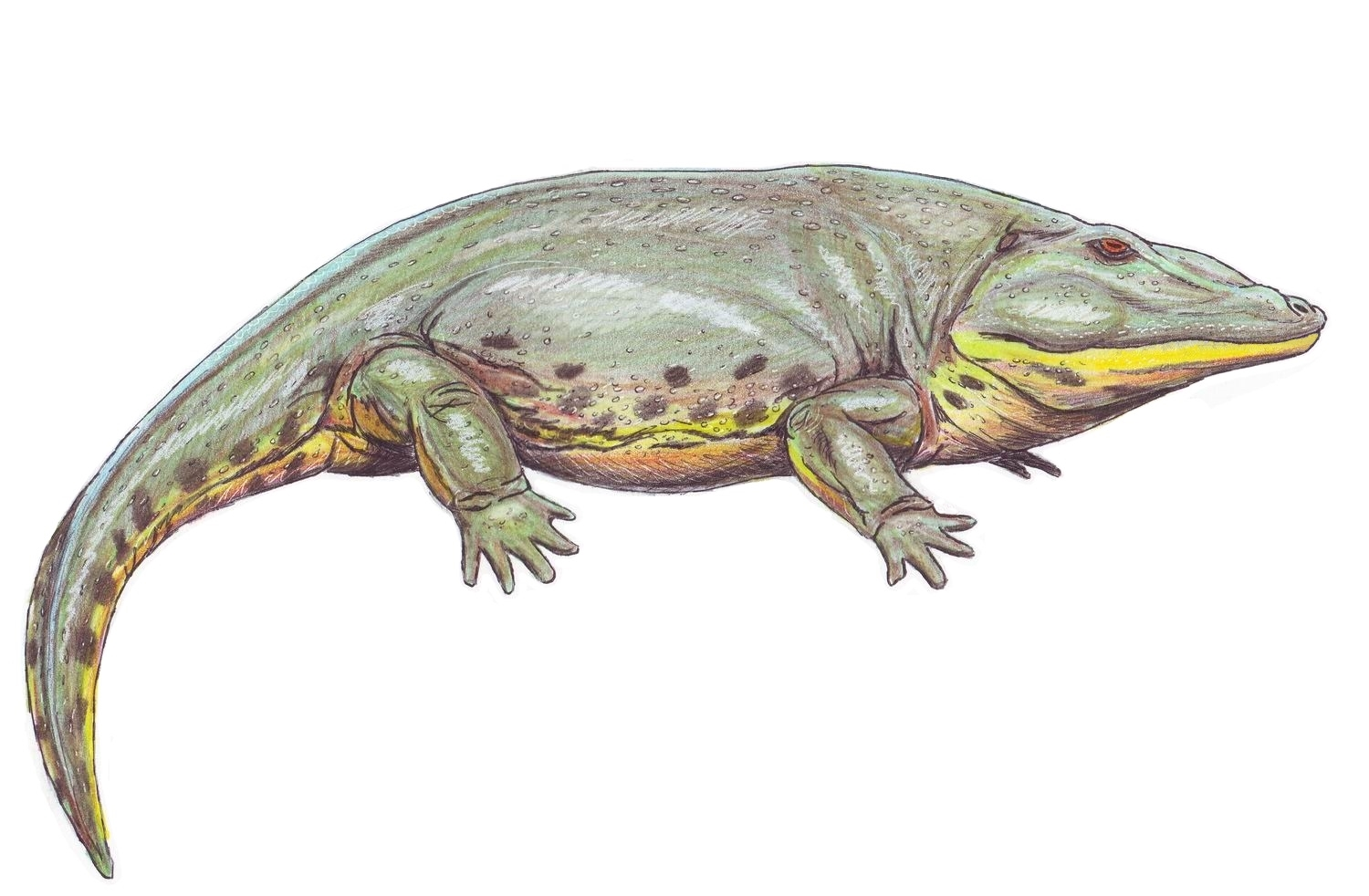
Life restoration

Eryops averaged a little over 1.5–2.0 m (4 ft 11 in – 6 ft 7 in) long and could grow up to 3 m (9 ft 10 in), making them among the largest land animals of their time. Adults have been estimated to weigh between 102 and 222 kg (225 and 489 lb). The skull was large and relatively broad compared to coeval temnospondyls; the skull reached lengths of around 45 cm (18 in).

The postcranial skeleton of Eryops is among the most completely known of all temnospondyls. The configuration of the postcrania is similar to that of other temnospondyls, but the relative degree of ossification and overall size of the animal produce some of the sturdiest and most robust postcrania among Paleozoic temnospondyls.

The texture of Eryops skin was revealed by a fossilized "mummy" described in 1941. This mummy specimen showed that the body in life was covered in a pattern of oval bumps.

== Discovery and species ==
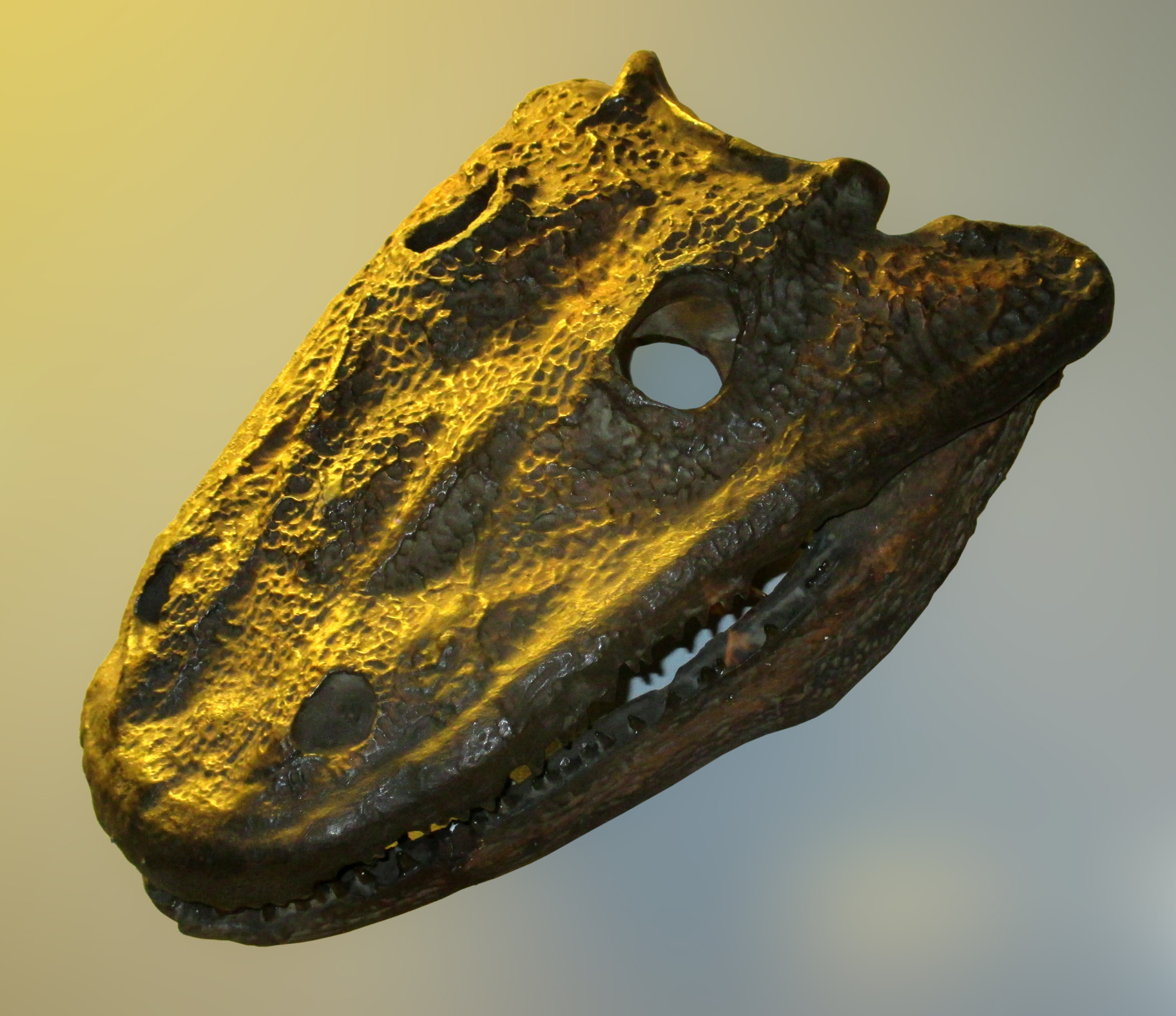
Cast of the skull

Eryops is currently thought to contain two presently valid species. The type species, E. megacephalus, refers to the "large-headed" aspect of the genus. Remains of E. megacephalus have been found in rocks dated to the early Permian period (Sakmarian age, about 293 million years ago) in the southwestern United States. Most of these specimens, including the type material, have little to no locality information other than that they are from the early Permian of Texas, but more definitively placed specimens are recorded for much of the Cisuralian, including the Putnam, Admiral, Belle Plains, and Clyde Formations. The second nominal species is Eryops grandis, which was described from the Cutler Formation of New Mexico and also known from Colorado.

Various other valid temnospondyl taxa were previously placed in the genus. During the mid-20th century, some older fossils were classified as a second species of Eryops, E. avinoffi. This species, known from Carboniferous period fossil found in Pennsylvania, had originally been classified in the genus Glaukerpeton. Beginning in the late 1950s, some scientists concluded that Glaukerpeton was too similar to Eyrops to merit taxonomic distinction. However, revision of the material confirmed that it could be differentiated from Eryops based on various morphological features. 'Eryops anatinus' and 'Eryops latus' are both junior synonyms of E. megacephalus. 'Eryops' ferricolus is now recognized as a dissorophid, Parioxys, 'Eryops platypus' is a junior synonym of the amphibamid Platyrhinops lyelli, and 'Eryops africanus' and 'Eryops oweni' are rhinesuchids. 'Eryops reticulatus' is regarded as a nomen vanum, though it is alternatively regarded as a junior synonym of E. grandis.

Material only tentatively referred to E. megacephalus or only to the genus has been reported from Kansas, New Mexico, Utah, Oklahoma, and Prince Edward Island. The primary material of Eryops that has been reported from the Conemaugh Group in West Virginia has also been reidentified as Glaukerpeton, although unpublished specimens referred to Eryops sp. (and with acknowledgment of the validity of Glaukerpeton) have been listed from this region.

== Paleobiology ==
Eryops was one of the largest non-amniote tetrapods of the early Permian; among temnospondyls, it was rivaled in size only by edopoids, which were relatively rare. The ecology of Eryops has been extensively debated and remains without consensus due to conflicting signals from different lines of evidence, such as external morphology, biomechanical modeling, and bone histology. Eryops lived in lowland habitats in and around ponds, streams, and rivers, and the arrangement and shape of their teeth suggests that they probably ate mostly large fish and aquatic tetrapods. The torso of Eryops was relatively stiff and the tail stout, which would have made them poor swimmers. While they probably fed on fish, adult Eryops must have spent most of their time on land.

Like other large primitive temnospondyls, Eryops would have grown slowly and gradually from aquatic larvae, but they did not go through a major metamorphosis like many modern amphibians. While adults probably lived in ponds and rivers, perhaps venturing onto their banks, juvenile Eryops may have lived in swamps, which possibly offered more shelter from predators.
