= Perryella =

Perryella Temporal range: Early Permian

Scientific classification
- Kingdom: Animalia
- Phylum: Chordata
- Order: †Temnospondyli
- Suborder: †Dvinosauria
- Genus: †Perryella; Carlson, 1987

Species
- †P. olsoni Carlson, 1987 (type)

Extinct genus of amphibians

Perryella is an extinct genus of dvinosaurian(?) temnospondyl from the Permian of Oklahoma.

== History of study ==
The type and only species, P. olsoni, was named in 1987 from the Wellington Formation exposures of Noble County, Oklahoma, which is Early Permian in age. It is known from several skulls and partial remains of vertebrae and limbs. The genus name is for the nearby town of Perry, Oklahoma. The specific name honors the American paleontologist Everett C. Olson. A subsequent study by Ruta & Bolt (2006) was based on the further preparation of the cranial material in particular.

== Anatomy ==
Perryella has a melange of different features, which contributes to uncertainty regarding its phylogenetic position (see below). It has proportionately large orbits and interpterygoid vacuities and a well-developed otic notch. Ruta & Bolt (2006) listed an extensive number of features that contribute to a unique combination of features, such as a frontal entering the orbit; orbits positioned at the approximate midlength of the skull; the absence of lateral line grooves; and parasphenoid denticles restricted to the region anterior to the basipterygoid processes. These were based on autapomorphies identified from their phylogenetic analysis, and the more recent diagnosis listed by Schoch & Milner (2014) only lists seven features, some shared with Ruta & Bolt and others new (e.g., humerus with supinator process).

== Phylogeny ==
As originally interpreted by Carlson (1987), Perryella shared features with both trimerorhachid dvinosaurs and with dissorophoids based on select comparisons. For example, it shares a medial process of the quadratojugal that participates in the jaw articulation with Micromelerpeton, but this process does not wrap around a dorsal process of the quadrate as in many dissorophoids. A large exposure of the palatine bone on the skull roof (typically only exposed on the palate), termed a 'lateral exposure of the palatine' (LEP) is also common to dissorophoids and is found in Perryella, but it also occurs in some dvinosaurs like Acroplous and Isodectes. Carlson also cited proportions of the orbits, otic notches, and interpterygoid vacuities; the presence of denticles on the parasphenoid; the absence of an intertemporal; the presence of a double occipital condyle; and a retroarticular process on the lower jaw as evidence of dissorophoid affinities, although as he noted, these are commonly shared with other "advanced" temnospondyls and are perhaps better viewed as evidence against dvinosaur affinities. Carlson's reticence to place it within Dissorophoidea stemmed from the anatomy of the otic notch, as well as the separation between the lacrimal and the orbit and an anteriorly extensive jugal. Carlson (1987) originally did not place it within a particular family or superfamily as a result.

Other workers more confidently placed Perryella as a dissorophoid. In 2006, a phylogenetic analysis of Perryella as part of a larger redescription placed it within Dvinosauria as an intermediate form between trimerorhachids and other dvinosaurs. This analysis included stem tetrapods and Paleozoic temnospondyls and recovered dissorophoids and dvinosaurs as sister groups. Below is a portion of their phylogenetic topology:

- - - Capetus
    - - Zatracheidae
      - - Eryops
        - - Onchiodon
          - Stereospondylomorpha
  - - - Dendrerpeton confusum
      - Dissorophoidea
        - Olsoniformes
        - - Platyrhinops
          - - Eoscopus
            - - - Amphibamus
                - Doleserpeton
              - - Micromelerpeton
                - Branchiosauridae
    - - Dendrerpeton acadianum
      - - Balanerpeton
        - Dvinosauria
          - Eugyrinus
          - - - Trimerorhachis
              - Neldasaurus
            - - Perryella
              - - - Acroplous
                  - Isodectes
                - - Dvinosaurus
                  - - Slaugenhopia
                    - - Thabanchuia
                      - Tupilakosaurus

Schoch & Milner (2014) placed Perryella as an indeterminate dissorophoid, arguing that it shared certain features such as the LEP with 'amphibamids' (now amphibamiforms) and micromelerpetids; this classification was based on qualitative comparisons, as they did not perform a phylogenetic analysis. Schoch (2018) included Perryella in an analysis and recovered it as a "stem dissorophoid" (closely related to Dissorophoidea). Below is Schoch's phylogeny:

- - Dvinosauria
    Trimerorhachis
  - - Acanthostomatops
    - Sclerocephalus
    - - Perryella
      - Dissorophoidea
        - Micromelerpetontidae
        - - - Trematopidae
            - Dissorophidae
          - - - Platyrhinops
              - Eoscopus
            - - Micropholidae
              - - Amphibamidae
                - - Branchiosauridae
                  - - Gerobatrachus
                    - Lissamphibia
