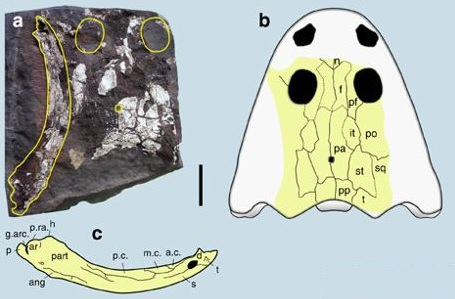
- Photo and diagram of fossils of Procuhy nazariensis

Scientific classification
- Kingdom: Animalia
- Phylum: Chordata
- Clade: Tetrapoda
- Order: †Temnospondyli
- Suborder: †Dvinosauria
- Family: †Trimerorhachidae
- Genus: †Procuhy; Cisneros et al., 2015

Type species
- †Procuhy nazariensis Cisneros et al., 2015

= Procuhy =

Procuhy Temporal range: Early Permian, 278 Ma

Extinct genus of amphibians

Procuhy is an extinct genus of dvinosaurian temnospondyl amphibian in the family Trimerorhachidae represented by the type species Procuhy nazariensis from the Early Permian of Brazil.

== History of study ==
Procuhy was named in 2015 on the basis of a partial skull from the lower part of the Pedra de Fogo Formation in Parnaíba Basin, which is about 278 million years old. The genus name comes from the words for 'frog' (prôt) and 'fire' (cuhy) in the local Timbira language of the Macro-Jê group and refers to the name of the Pedra de Fogo Formation. The species name comes from the Nazaria Municipality where the holotype was collected from. A second specimen, discovered in 2015, was described by Marsicano et al. (2021), who provided a more complete description of this taxon.

== Anatomy ==
Both specimens of P. nazariensis are relatively fragmentary, and the taxon is diagnosed only by a unique combination of characters rather than by any autapomorphies. Per Marsicano et al., this combination is: anteriormost extension of the squamosal posterior to parietal midlength; combined width of both parietals equal to interorbital width; pineal foramen positioned posterior to the midlength of the parietal; supratemporal exposed on the posterior border of the skull table; length of the parietal more than three times its width; in the mandible, presence of postglenoid process of the surangular separated from the retroarticular process of the articular by the mandibular sulcus.

== Phylogeny ==
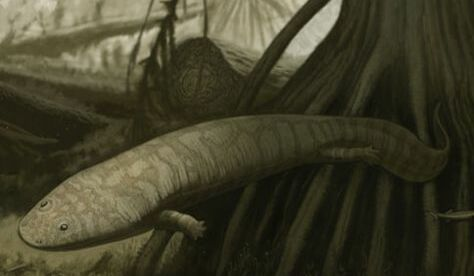
Restoration of Procuhy nazariensis

Below are the phylogenetic results of Marsicano et al. (2021):

- - - Erpetosaurus
    - - - Neldasaurus
        - Trypanognathus
      - - Procuhy
        - Trimerorhachis
  - - Dvinosaurus
    - - Timonya
      - - Isodectes
        - - Acroplous
          - - Thabanchuia
            - Tupilakosaurus

Both these results and those of the original description by Cisneros et al. (2015) show that Procuhy is more closely related to the North American Trimerorhachis than to the other dvinosaur from the Pedra de Fogo Formation, Timonya, although both are more closely related to North American taxa than to younger taxa from the southern hemisphere like the Early Triassic Thabanchuia from South Africa. A close connection to the North American taxa is also corroborated by the occurrence of the captorhinid Captorhinikos in the Pedra de Fogo Formation.
