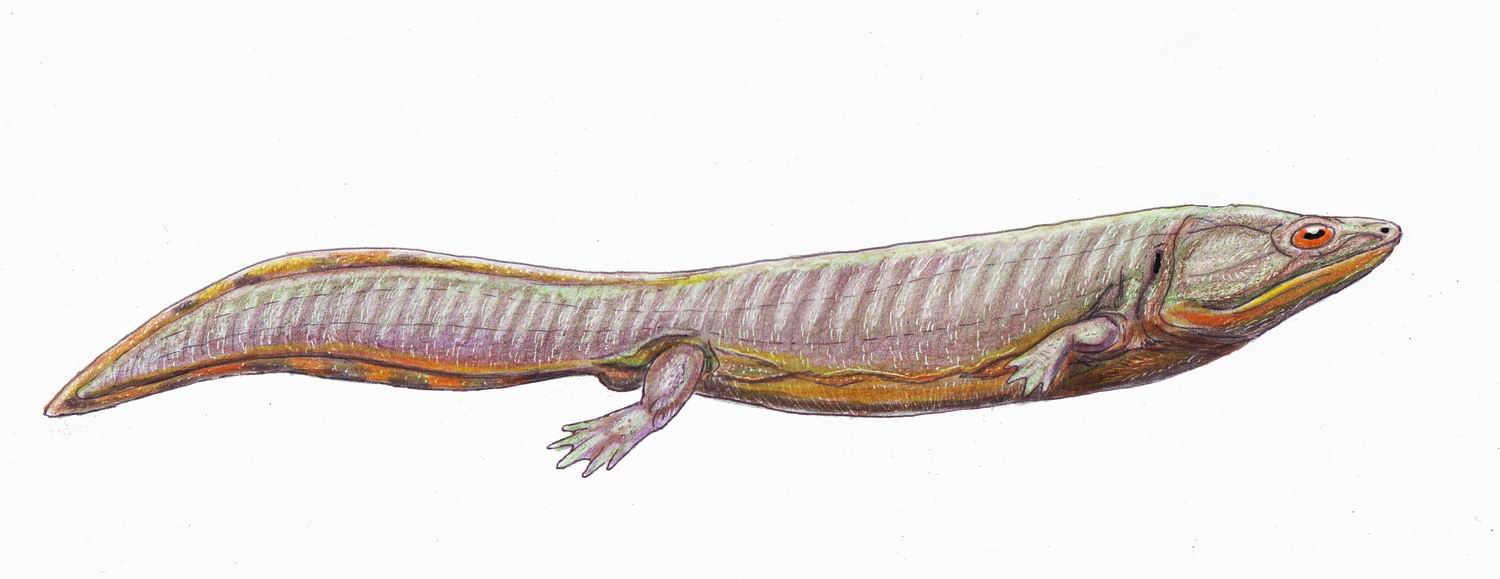
- Life restoration of Dvinosaurus egregius

Scientific classification
- Kingdom: Animalia
- Phylum: Chordata
- Clade: Tetrapoda
- Order: †Temnospondyli
- Suborder: †Dvinosauria
- Superfamily: †Dvinosauroidea
- Family: †Dvinosauridae; Amalitzkii, 1921
- Genus: †Dvinosaurus; Amalitzky, 1921

Type species
- †Dvinosaurus primus Amalitzkii, 1921

Other species
- †D. egregius Shishkin, 1968; †D. purlensis Shishkin, 1968; †D. campbelli Gubin, 2004; †D. gubini Uliakhin & Golubev, 2024

= Dvinosaurus =

Dvinosaurus Temporal range: Middle - Late Permian 265–254 Ma

Extinct genus of amphibians

Dvinosaurus is an extinct genus of amphibious temnospondyls localized to regions of western and central Russia during the middle and late Permian, approximately 265-254 million years ago. Its discovery was first noted in 1921 by Russian paleontologist Vladimir Prokhorovich Amalitskii in a posthumously published paper that documents the findings of a site in Russia's Arkhangelsk District. Its name is derived from the proximity of this site to the Northern Dvina River.

Dvinosaurus is thought to have been a gill-breathing, fully-aquatic tetrapod, characterized by a large, triangular head, short limbs, and a long powerful tail. A typical individual could grow to be approximately 40 in (100 cm) in length.

Within this genus, the number of documented species has varied over the years since its discovery. Prior to his untimely death, Amalitskii described three species, Dvinosaurus primus, Dvinosaurus secundus, and Dvinosaurus tertius. Upon further analysis, however, these three proposed species would be reclassified as solely D. primus as the latter two were found to be age-stages of the same species. Later in the century, Mikhail Shishkin would describe two different species of Dvinosaurus named Dvinosaurus egregius and Dvinosaurus purlensis based on specimens from a locality south of Amalitskii's original site. Finally, in 2004 a new species of Dvinosaurus named D. campbelli was described by Y.M. Gubin based on deposits from the Middle Volga Region, a locality centered around the Volga River, which runs through Western Russia before draining into the Caspian Sea.

== History and description ==
=== History ===
Following his death in 1917, Amalitskii's notes and initial observations of Dvinosaurus were transferred to the Paleontological Institute of the Russian Academy of Sciences. Over the course of the next 8 years, Prof. Petr Sushkin carried out a thorough analysis of these notes in order to provide the first description of Dvinosaurus. Later in the century, at a site near the small town of Vyazniki in western Russia, many more Dvinosaurus specimens were identified and analyzed by B.P. Vjuschkov and Mikhail Shishkin, who classified two new species of Dvinosaurus and added to the depiction of the genus as whole in the process. What follows is a summary and general description of their combined findings.

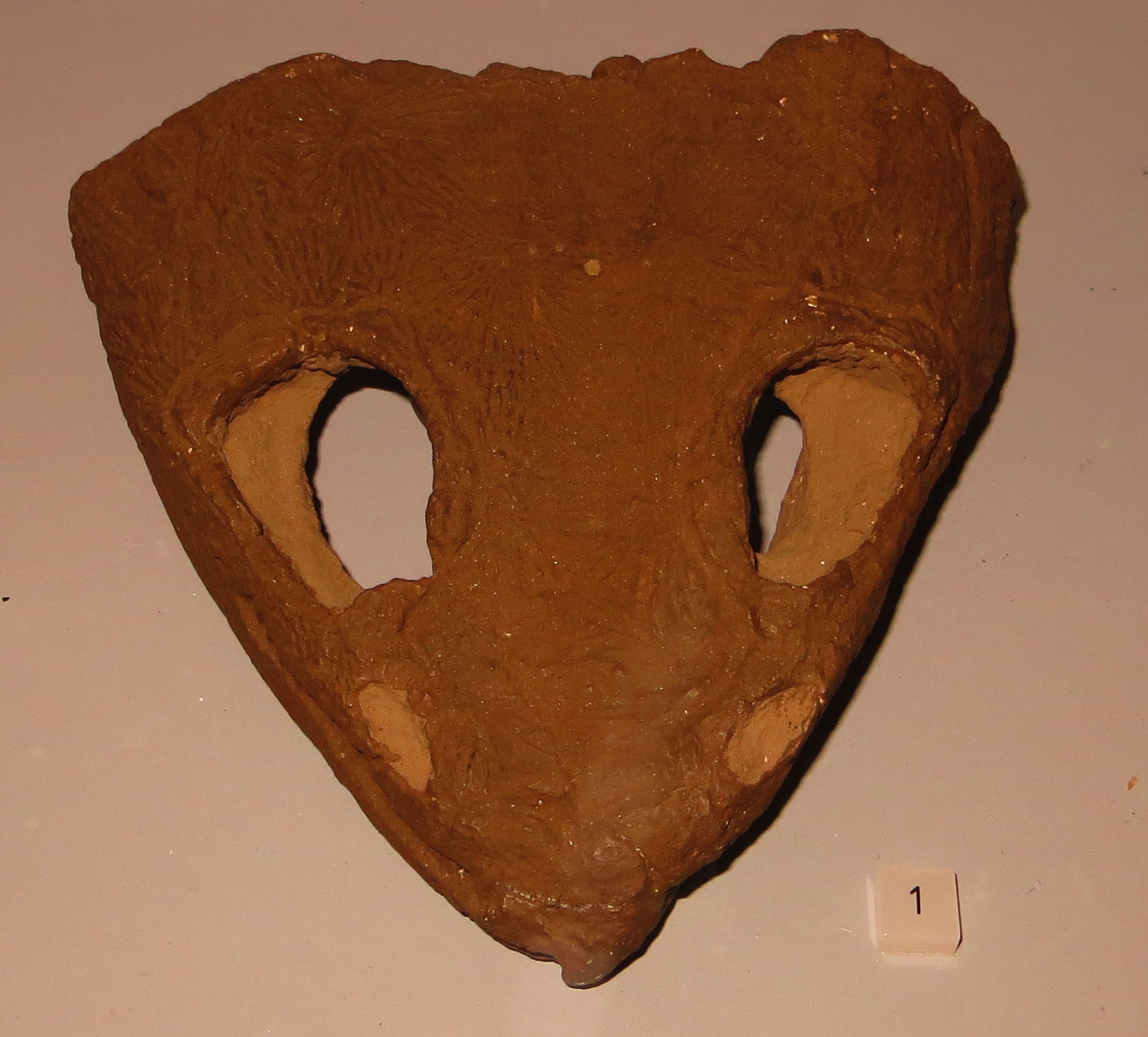
D. primus skull

=== General description and skull ===
As detailed by Amalitskii and subsequently Sushkin, Dvinosaurus is roughly 40 inches in length, although some species could be larger, up to 2.5 meters. It featured smooth skin suited for an aquatic environment. Its head is a large, rounded triangular shape with sizable orbits that account for nearly 1/4 of the length of the skull. Of note, Dvinosaurus’ skull lacks an otic notch, while also featuring a noticeably elongated occipital region. Like other temnospondyls, it features large interpterygoid vacuities and a number of tusks dispersed throughout its palate. Its teeth consist of both large, recurved fangs and smaller, conical teeth, the combination of which suggests that it fed on fish or similarly sized tetrapods.

=== Post-cranial elements ===
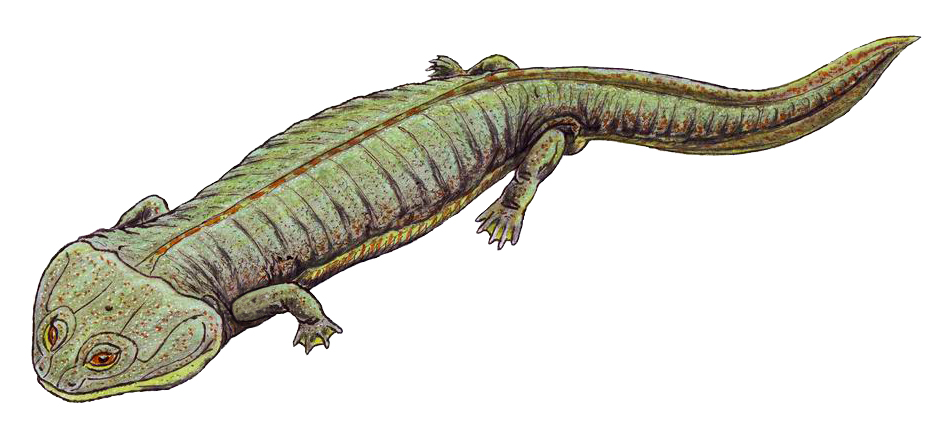
D. primus

It is known that Dvinosaurus featured a highly ossified branchial skeleton just posterior to the skull that would have provided support for 4 pairs of gills. Although gills were once considered as external, later study shows that are more likely to be internal gills like fish have. Additionally, Dvinosaurus had a long vertebral column (pre-sacral vertebral count of 28) with short, thick ribs reminiscent of those found in Amphibia. Its vertebrae also featured hemal arches. Its vertebrae were rhachitomous with an enlarged intercentrum and small, paired pleurocentra. The bones of its forelimbs and hindlimbs are short, stout, and display several characteristics of aquatic organisms such as incomplete ossification and flattening of limb bones. Finally, prominent spinous processes found in the more caudal vertebrae indicate that Dvinosaurus possessed a powerful tail that, in combination with its short, muscular limbs, could propel it rapidly toward its prey.

=== Variation amongst species ===
There is, of course, a degree of variation on this description amongst species within this genus. Most distinctions between species arise in the form of minor modifications in jaw structure, but some differences are more easily noted. In D. egregious the loss of tooth rows on the coracoids and different positioning of palatal canines distinguishes this species from Amalitskii's D. primus. In D. purlensis, variation is seen in the vertebral column with the fusion of the hypocentrum and pleurocentrum. The most recently described species, D. campbelli is distinguished by the addition of a long interchoanal tooth row and distinct modifications to the bones of its forelimbs. It is also the largest of the species within the genus, with a measured skull length of 26 cm in contrast to a maximal length of 19.6 cm in D. primus.

== Paleobiology ==
=== Habitat ===
As previously mentioned, Dvinosaurus was a fully aquatic organism, typically occupying rivers and large streams. As a byproduct of its orbits being situated on the top of its head, it is thought that Dvinosaurus preferred deeper rivers as this would allow for improved predation of the fish in the upper water levels.

Dvinosaurus is found most commonly in sandy localities and are thought to have preferred highly hydrodynamic bodies of water.

=== Feeding ===
Based on its pattern of dentition, Dvinosaurus was clearly carnivorous, primarily feeding on fish. It is likely that it relied on ambushing its prey by waiting on the bottom of riverbeds before quickly lunging to secure its prey. Within the Vyazniki locality itself, Dvinosaurus is thought to have been a mid-level predator, preying upon invertebrates, paleonisciforms, hybodontiformes, and larval forms of other aquatic tetrapods, while conversely being hunted by chroniosuchians such as Bystrowiana.

=== Locomotion ===
Dvinosaurus’ primary form of movement and predation in its aquatic environment was accomplished through the use of its strong tail and limbs, unlike many of its close relatives which used a wriggling motion in their torsos for movement. The unfused vertebrae featured in most species, likely provided increased flexibility of the axial skeleton, an adaptation well suited for a fully-aquatic environment.

=== Neoteny ===
Interestingly, upon analysis of Dvinosaurus’ characteristics it was determined that this genus displayed a mixture of both primitive and progressive traits in relation to its larger subclass, labyrinthodonts. Initially these findings were puzzling and to some were thought to be a violation of Dollo's Law, which states “an organism never returns exactly to a former state, even if it finds itself placed in conditions of existence identical to those in which it has previously lived.”

The seemingly backward evolution seen in Dvinosaurus, however, is now thought instead to be neoteny, or the retention of juvenile characteristics in adult forms of an organism. This phenomenon is largely thought to be due to the environmental pressures of the later portions of the Permian. During this period, dry climate made life for land-dwelling amphibians near impossible and led to the extinction of many species of labyrinthodonts. A mature, land-dwelling form of Dvinosaurus is thought to have been amongst those that went extinct, while its larval, fully-aquatic form persisted. The primitive traits, such as a thin skull roof and underdeveloped sense organs, found in the larval form, and subsequently lost in the mature form, better suited a fully aquatic lifestyle, and thereby allowed Dvinosaurus to avoid extinction on land. Consequently, Dvinosaurus is the only labyrinthodont present in the Northern Dvina region and is thought to be primarily represented by its larval form.

== Geographic distribution ==
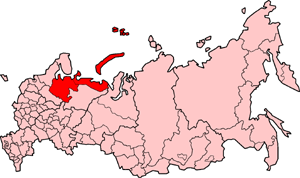
The Arkhangelsk Oblast in northwestern Russia

Dvinosaurus is localized almost entirely to regions of Eastern Europe, primarily in Western and Central Russia. While its distribution is restricted to regions containing rivers such as the Volga and Northern Dvina, it is thought that these localities may have undergone significant geographical shifting during continental drifts approximately 200 million years ago. Several close relatives of Dvinosaurus, most notably Brachyopidae such as Brachyops, Bothriceps, and Batrachosuchus, inhabited regions of Gondwana, a supercontinent comprising present day Africa, India, South America, Australia, and Antarctica. It is feasible that these relatives and Dvinosauran precursors dwelled on this supercontinent before migrating north to the regions where Dvinosaurus ultimately appears in the fossil record.

There are currently 45 locations across Eastern Europe at which Dvinosaurus remains have been documented, most of which are found in the Arhangelsk district in northwestern Russia bordering the White Sea in the Arctic Ocean.

== Classification ==
Dvinosaurus belongs to the larger clade Dvinosauria, which also includes the taxa Trimerorhachis, Neldasaurus, Perryella, Acroplous, Isodectes, Slaugenhopia, Kourerpeton, Tupilakosaurus, and Thabanchuia. This clade falls under the group or "order" Temnospondyli, which traditionally was classified under the larger amphibian subclass, Labyrinthodontia.

- Dvinosauria
  - Trimerorhachidae
    - Trimerorhachis
    - Neldasaurus
  - - Perryella
    - Dvinosauroidea
      - Isodectes (Eobrachyopidae)
      - - Acroplous (Eobrachyopidae)
        - - Dvinosauridae
          - Kourerpetidae
          - Tupilakosauridae
            - Slaugenhopia
            - Tupilakosaurus
            - Thabanchuia
