= Nannospondylus =

Nannospondylus Temporal range: Permian, 272.5–265.0 Ma

Scientific classification
- Kingdom: Animalia
- Phylum: Chordata
- Clade: Tetrapoda
- Order: †Temnospondyli
- Genus: †Nannospondylus; E. C. Olson, 1965

Type species
- †Nannospondylus stewarti E. C. Olson, 1965

Genus of amphibians (fossil)

Nannospondylus is an extinct genus of temnospondyl of uncertain validity and taxonomic placement. It is known from the Permian Chickasha Formation in Oklahoma.

== History of study ==
The holotype and only known specimen of Nannospondylus stewarti, the type and only species, was collected from the Chickasha Formation near Hitchcock (Olson's BC-6 locality) in Blaine County, Oklahoma. FMNH UR 1002 is represented by four vertebrae, ribs, and a indeterminate long bone (Olson originally identified it as a rib). No other fossils were collected from this horizon.

== Anatomy ==
The identification of some of the holotype's elements is an open question. There are unambiguous vertebrae and ribs, but the "odd bone" that Olson tentatively identified as a rib with a tripartite head has been suggested to instead be a fragmentary femur. Olson also mentioned that this element was found next to the shoulder girdle, but no pectoral elements are cited in the listing of the holotype. Schoch & Milner (2014) suggested that all of the vertebral and axial material pertains to the tail of a temnospondyl.

== Relationships and validity ==
Olson originally placed N. stewarti in the dvinosaur family Trimerorhachidae, with little justification other than favorable comparisons to similar elements in Slaugenhopia and Dvinosaurus, neither of which is considered to be a trimerorhachid in the contemporary taxonomic framework (both are tupilakosaurids). Olson also admitted that the family placement is "open to some question, since the information available for any assignment is slight."

Subsequent workers have typically regarded N. stewarti as a nomen dubium due to a lack of diagnostic features. Because most temnospondyls are known from at least some cranial material, cranial features usually form the basis for diagnoses, the absence of any associated with N. stewarti complicates diagnosing the taxon.

== See also ==
- Prehistoric amphibian
- List of prehistoric amphibians
