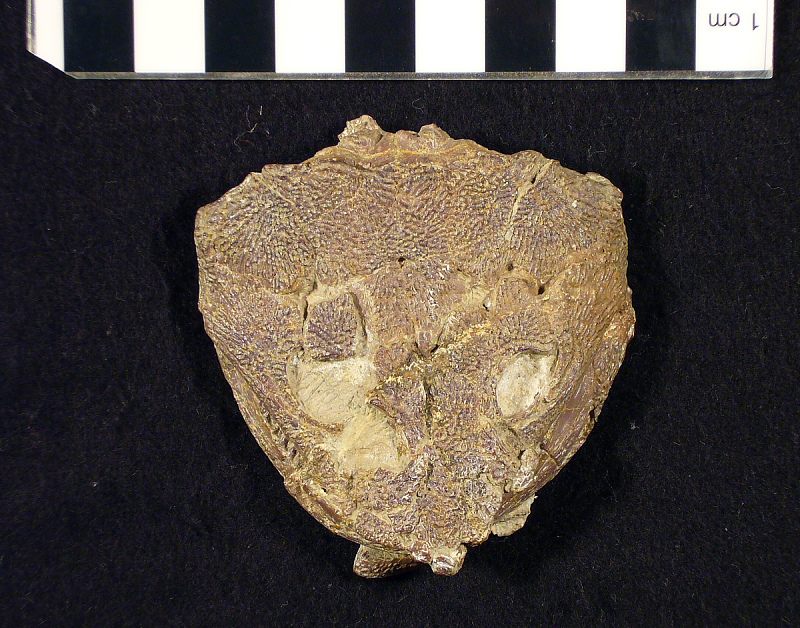

Scientific classification
- Kingdom: Animalia
- Phylum: Chordata
- Clade: Tetrapoda
- Order: †Temnospondyli
- Suborder: †Dvinosauria
- Family: †Eobrachyopidae
- Genus: †Acroplous; Hotton, 1959

Type species
- Acroplous vorax Hotton, 1959

= Acroplous =

Acroplous Temporal range: Early Permian

Extinct genus of amphibians

Acroplous is an extinct genus of dvinosaurian Temnospondyli within the family Eobrachyopidae.

== History of study ==
Acroplous was described by Nicholas Hotton in 1959 for the type species, A. vorax. The type locality is in Riley County, Kansas within the Speiser Shale (early Permian). The original description only described the holotype (KUVP 9822), a partially disarticulated skull with isolated, associated postcrania. The genus name comes from the Greek word for 'swimming at the top,' based on Hotton's inference of the animal as being a surface cruising animal. The species name comes from the inferred voracity of the taxon. Hotton suggested that some material from the Dunkard Group of Pennsylvania that had been previously described by Romer (1952) as 'Saurerpeton obtusum' might represent an Appalachian occurrence of Acroplous. However, this material is not considered to belong to either Acroplous or to Isodectes, the senior synonym of Saurerpeton, and instead has been listed as merely Dvinosauroidea incertae sedis by Schoch & Milner (2014). The type locality was reopened in 1971 by Orville Bonner and Larry Martin at the University of Kansas, which led to the discovery of additional vertebrate material, including a new specimen of Acroplous that was described by Coldiron (1978). Like the holotype, this specimen also consisted of a partially disarticulated skull with isolated, associated postcrania. Coldiron also presented one of the earliest phylogenies of Dvinosauria (see also for discussion of relationships), but these early analyses in general were compromised by the perception of the time that brachyopoids were closely related to dvinosaurs, whereas this has not been supported by more recent cladistic analyses. Nonetheless, these workers were correct in identifying many similarities with Isodectes, which is currently the only other eobrachyopid.

Additional material of Acroplous was discovered from another locality in the Speiser Shale about 40 miles from the type locality in Wabaunsee County, Kansas in 1976. This material was described by Foreman (1990), who also noted additional, previously undescribed material from the type locality. The specimens described by Foreman were the most completely known skulls, which permitted a complete cranial reconstruction. Foreman continued the framework in which Acroplous was placed in the same family as Isodectes (Saurerpetontidae, now a junior synonym of Eobrachyopidae following synonymy of Saurerpeton with Isodectes). Most recently, Englehorn et al. (2008) described new material of Acroplous from several localities in Eskridge Formation exposures in Richardson County, Nebraska as well as another specimen from the type locality that had been collected by Hotton in the 1960s. The Nebraska exposures (the "Humboldt localities") are thought to be Asselian in age and thus older than the horizons from the Speiser Shale. This description provided additional information on the skull based on the most completely known specimens and the most detailed information on the lower jaw. By 2008, the notion that dvinosaurs and brachyopoids were closely related had fallen out of favor, and thus Englehorn et al.'s phylogenetic analysis only sampled other Paleozoic taxa, in which they recovered Acroplous as closely related to Isodectes.

== Anatomy ==
Acroplous is diagnosed by several autapomorphies (among dvinosaurs), including an internarial fenestra between the premaxillae; anteroposteriorly shortened postparietals; and interlocking mandibular symphyses formed by medially projecting prongs. Compared to Isodectes, it has a proportionately broader skull (wider than long), lacks an intertemporal, and has less developed lateral line grooves. Notably, the most complete specimens of Acroplous are smaller than those represented by more fragmentary or isolated cranial remains, which suggests that previous descriptions have been based on sub-adult or juvenile material.

== Phylogeny ==
Historically, Acroplous has been placed in the same family as Isodectes (and associated junior synonyms with Saurerpeton). However, this family has sometimes been recovered as paraphyletic within the broader Dvinosauroidea. Below is the phylogeny from Marsicano et al. (2021):

- Dvinosauria
  - - Erpetosaurus
    - - - Neldasaurus
        - Trypanognathus
      - - Procuhy
        - Trimerorhachis
  - - Dvinosaurus
    - - Timonya
      - - Isodectes
        - - Acroplous
          - - Thabanchuia
            - Tupilakosaurus

== See also ==
- Prehistoric amphibian
- List of prehistoric amphibians
