= Lafonius =

Lafonius Temporal range: Carboniferous, 303.4–298.9 Ma

Scientific classification
- Kingdom: Animalia
- Phylum: Chordata
- Clade: Tetrapoda
- Order: †Temnospondyli
- Suborder: †Dvinosauria
- Family: †Trimerorhachidae
- Genus: †Lafonius; Berman, 1973

Type species
- †Lafonius lehmani Berman, 1973

Extinct genus of amphibians

Lafonius is an extinct genus dvinosaurian temnospondyl within the family Trimerorhachidae. It is known from the late Carboniferous of New Mexico. It is represented only by the type species, Lafonius lehmani.

== History of study ==
The holotype and only known specimen of Lafonius lehmani was discovered in 1971 by Neal La Fon and Thomas Lehman, amateur fossil collectors in New Mexico, who collected the specimen from a rich fossil-bearing locality in the Manzano Mountains of New Mexico that is now known as the Kinney Brick Quarry (Tinajas Member of the Astrasado Formation). The genus and species epithets honor these collectors.

== Anatomy ==
The holotype is a partial, disarticulated skeleton on a slab, with a nearly complete skull (mainly the roof) and pair of lower jaws and more fragmentary limb, vertebral, scale, and branchial elements. The skull is relatively small, being around 2 cm when complete, and relatively short anteroposteriorly compared to other taxa (which are often known from larger specimens). Based on this and aspects of the branchial apparatus, it has been interpreted as a larval individual. Berman (1973) diagnosed the taxon as a Trimerorhachis-like trimerorhachid that differs from Trimerorhachis in having a broad jugal-orbit contact; a double row of coronoid teeth restricted to the second (middle) coronoid with a pair of tusks (enlarged teeth) on the first (anterior) and last (posterior) coronoids; lesser elongation of the postorbital region, which is mainly formed by elongation of elements posterior to the pineal foramen rather than more anterior elements; and a deeper otic notch. Schoch & Milner (2014) reduced the diagnosis to only two features, the broad jugal-orbit contact and the dentition pattern of the coronoids. It is differentiated from the co-occurring dvinosaur Bermanerpeton kinneyi (the "indeterminate saurerpetontid" of Hunt et al., 1992) by features including (1) small orbits; (2) elongated and wide postorbital region; (3) nasal as wide as long; (4) intertemporal present; (5) postorbital elongated; (6) postparietal much more elongated than tabular; and (7) short and robust humerus and femur.

== Phylogenetic relationships ==
Lafonius was originally classified as a trimerorhachid by Berman (1973) and has been maintained as such by other workers. Given the larval status of the holotype and the relative incompleteness compared to other trimerorhachids, Lafonius is not usually incorporated into phylogenetic analyses of dvinosaurs.
