= Nedubrovo =

Nedubrovo Недуброво
- Village
- Location within Vologda Oblast Location within Russia
- Coordinates: 60°02′N 45°44′E
- Country: Russia
- Region: Vologda Oblast
- District: Kichmengsko-Gorodetsky District
- Time zone: UTC+3:00

Nedubrovo (Russian: Недуброво) is a rural locality (a village) in Kichmegnskoye Rural Settlement, Kichmengsko-Gorodetsky District, Vologda Oblast, Russia. The population was 24 as of 2002.

== Geography ==
Nedubrovo is located 7 km northwest of Kichmengsky Gorodok (the district's administrative centre) by road. Sudnicheskaya Gora is the nearest rural locality.

== Paleontology ==
Fossil of temnospondyl amphibian Tupilakosaurus was found in the Lower Triassic (Lower Induan) deposits of Nedubrovo.
