= Telyanino =

Telyanino Телянино
- Village
- Location within Vologda Oblast Location within Russia
- Coordinates: 59°50′N 45°03′E
- Country: Russia
- Region: Vologda Oblast
- District: Nikolsky District
- Time zone: UTC+3:00

Telyanino (Russian: Телянино) is a rural locality (a village) in Argunovskoye Rural Settlement, Nikolsky District, Vologda Oblast, Russia. The population was 107 as of 2002.

== Geography ==
Telyanino is located 51 km northwest of Nikolsk (the district's administrative centre) by road. Krasnaya Zvezda is the nearest rural locality.

== Paleontology ==
Fossil of temnospondyl Tupilakosaurus wetlugensis was found in the Lower Triassic (probably Upper Induan) deposits of Telyanino.
