= Slaugenhopia =

Slaugenhopia Temporal range: Early Permian, 279.5–268.0 Ma

Scientific classification
- Kingdom: Animalia
- Phylum: Chordata
- Clade: Tetrapoda
- Order: †Temnospondyli
- Suborder: †Dvinosauria
- Family: †Tupilakosauridae
- Genus: †Slaugenhopia; Olson, 1962

Species
- †S. texensis Olson, 1962 (type)

Extinct genus of amphibians

Slaugenhopia is an extinct genus of dvinosaurian temnospondyl within the family Tupilakosauridae. Fossils have been found from the Early Permian San Angelo Formation in Texas. The type and only species, S. texensis, was named in 1962. It may be closely related to the dvinosaur Kourerpeton. Slaugenhopia was once classified as a trimerorhachid but is now classified as a tupilakosaurid.

== Description and history ==
Slaugenhopia was found from the San Angelo Formation within the Kahn Quarry of Driver Ranch in Knox County, Texas. Although it was known only from fragments, paleontologist Everett C. Olson reconstructed the entire skull when he named the genus in 1962. He placed the genus in the dvinosaur family Trimerorhachidae and thought that it was intermediate between the dvinosaurs Trimerorhachis and Dvinosaurus based on the shape of the skull. A mandible that was found earlier in Little Croton Creek was also referred to Slaugenhopia.

Slaugenhopia continued to be classified as a trimerorhachid until 1999 when a new dvinosaur called Thabanchuia was named from South Africa. Thabanchuia is a member of the family Tupilakosauridae and shares many similarities with Slaugenhopia. Because of these similarities, Slaugenhopia is now considered a tupilakosaurid.

Defining characteristics of Slaugenhopia include a notch in the pterygoid bone of the palate called the pterygoid incisure; the wideness of a projection of bone in the palate called the cultriform process, a wide contact between the parasphenoid and basisphenoid bones on the underside of the skull, and uniquely L-shaped postparietal bones at the back of the skull. Another Early Permian dvinosaur called Kourerpeton is also known from Texas and may be related to Slaugenhopia. Both dvinosaurs have an enlarged postorbital bone and a small postfrontal bone near the eye sockets. They also have similar vertebrae, with ring-like intercentra and small, crescent-shaped pleurocentra. While the posterior margin of the skull is relatively straight in Slaugenhopia, the same margin is curved and irregular in Kourerpeton. Kourerpeton also lacks the pterygoid incisure of Slaugenhopia, which is characteristic of other tupilakosaurids as well. Based on these differences, Kourerpeton is probably a basal relative of tupilakosaurids, including Slaugenhopia.
