= Eigilia =

Eigilia Temporal range: Roadian

Scientific classification
- Domain: Eukaryota
- Kingdom: Animalia
- Phylum: Chordata
- Class: Actinopterygii
- Order: †Elonichthyiformes
- Family: †Eigiliidae
- Genus: †Eigilia; Kazantseva-Selezneva, 1977
- Species: †E. nielseni

Binomial name
- †Eigilia nielseni Kazantseva-Selezneva, 1977

Extinct genus of fishes

Eigilia is an extinct genus of prehistoric freshwater ray-finned fish that lived during the Roadian age (Guadalupian/middle Permian) in what is now Kazakhstan (East Kazakhstan). It is known from the Verka Formation.

The type and only species, Eigilia nielseni, is named after paleoichthyologist Eigil Nielsen.

== See also ==
- Prehistoric fish
- List of prehistoric bony fish
