= Eigil Nielsen (paleontologist) =

Danish paleontologist (1910–1968)

Eigil Hans Aage Nielsen
- Born: 16 August 1910; Copenhagen
- Died: 8 December 1968 (aged 58); Gentofte
- Occupation: Palaeontologist
- Parent(s): Hans Peder Nielsen (father); Ellen Nielsen (mother)

Eigil Hans Aage Nielsen (16 August 1910 – 8 December 1968) was a Danish paleontologist, who specialized in fossil vertebrate anatomy, particularly of Triassic bony fish.

== Life ==
Eigil Nielsen was born in Copenhagen on 16 August 1910, to engineer Hans Peder Nielsen and his wife Ellen Nielsen (née Pedersen). He attended Sorø Akademi gymnasium. Already at young age, he collected fossils from different paleontological sites in Denmark. He later studied in Copenhagen, and received his Master's degree in 1935 and his doctorate degree in 1942. He studied especially fossil vertebrate faunas from Greenland, which were collected during multiple expeditions. In 1957, he became professor of paleontology in Copenhagen and curator at the Geological Museum in Copenhagen. He had been a member of the Royal Danish Academy of Sciences and Letters since 1965. He died in Gentofte on 8 December 1968 after a long illness.

== Research ==
Nielsen is mostly known for his in-depth monographs on Triassic ray-finned fishes from East Greenland (Australosomus, Birgeria, Boreosomus, Pteronisculus), which were collected from the Wordie Creek Formation during several expeditions. He also wrote studies on other Triassic ray-finned fishes (Bobasatrania, Errolichthys), Permian Chondrichthyes, Triassic amphibians, and Eocene bony fishes and turtles, among others. He also published several popular science articles in Danish.

He took part in Lauge Koch's 1931 expedition to Greenland and worked on the recovered Devonian vertebrate material (early amphibians, fish). For his studies, he spent longer periods in Stockholm with Erik Stensiö, where he learned new techniques in paleozoology. In the winter of 1932/33, he was in Greenland again (Cape Stosch, Clavering Ø). This time he collected ammonoids and fish fossils from layers dating back to the Permian and Triassic periods. The Permian actinopterygian fish material was later worked on by Hermann Aldinger, while Nielsen investigated the Triassic material. The tetrapod fossils were studied by Gunnar Säve-Söderbergh. In 1936/37, Nielsen was again in Greenland with Lauge Koch, when he discovered Carboniferous fishes, which were later studied by James Allan Moy-Thomas. In 1939, Nielsen went back to Greenland with Eigil Knuth and Ebbe Munck. Further Greenland expeditions followed in 1946 and 1955 as part of the Geological Survey of Greenland (GEUS).

In 1950, Nielsen did field research in the Himalayas (Spiti region), where he collected Permo-Carboniferous and Triassic fish fossils. He traveled to South Africa and Madagascar in 1953. In the early 1960s, he conducted research in Thailand, where he gathered prehistoric artifacts.

== Legacy ==
Nielsen named two genera of Permian-Triassic eugeneodontid holocephalans, Erikodus and Fadenia, a genus of Permian chondrichthyan, Arctacanthus, and a genus of Early Triassic temnospondyl amphibian, Tupilakosaurus.

A genus and species of Permian ray-finned fish, Eigilia nielseni, and a genus of Devonian lungfish, Nielsenia, are named in his honor.

== Selected publications ==
- Nielsen, E. 1932. Permo-Carboniferous fishes from East Greenland. Meddelelser om Grønland 86 (3), p. 1–63.
- Nielsen, E. 1935. The Permian and Eotriassic vertebrate-bearing beds at Godthaab Gulf (East Greenland). Meddelelser om Grønland 98, 1–111.
- Nielsen, E. 1936. Some few preliminary remarks on Triassic fishes from East Greenland. Meddelelser om Grønland 112 (3), p. 1–55.
- Nielsen, E. 1942. Studies on Triassic fishes from East Greenland 1. Glaucolepis and Boreosomus. Palaeozoologica Groenlandica 1, p. 1–403.
- Nielsen, E. 1949. Studies on Triassic fishes from East Greenland 2. Australosomus and Birgeria. Palaeozoologica Groenlandica 3, p. 1–309.
- Nielsen, E. 1952. A preliminary note on Bobasatrania groenlandica. Meddelelser fra Dansk Geologisk Forening 12 (12), p. 197–204.
- Nielsen, E. 1952. On new or little known Edestidae from the Permian and Triassic of East Greenland. Meddelelser om Grønland 144, p. 1–55.
- Nielsen, E. 1954: Tupilakosaurus heilmani n. g. et n. sp. an interesting batrachomorph from the Triassic of East Greenland. Meddelelser om Grønland 722 (8), 1–33.
- Nielsen, E. 1955. Notes on Triassic fishes from Madagascar. Meddelelser fra Dansk Geologisk Forening 12, p. 563–578.
- Nielsen, E. 1959. Eocene turtles from Denmark. Meddelelser fra Dansk Geologisk Forening 14, 96–114.
- Nielsen, E. 1960. A new Eocene teleost from Denmark. Meddelelser fra Dansk Geologisk Forening 14, 247–252.
- Nielsen, E. 1961. On the Eotriassic fish faunas of central east Greenland. In: Geology of the Arctic 1 (ed. G. O. Raasch), p. 255–257. University of Toronto Press, Toronto, Canada.
- Nielsen, E. 1963. On the postcranial skeleton of Eosphargis breineri Nielsen. Meddelelser fra Dansk Geologisk Forening 15, 281–313.
- Nielsen, E. 1967. New observations on the skull-roof of the holotype of Tupilakosaurus heilmani Nielsen. Journal of the Linnean Society (Zoology) 47, 311, 225–229.
