= Nielsenia =

Nielsenia Temporal range: Late Devonian

Scientific classification
- Domain: Eukaryota
- Kingdom: Animalia
- Phylum: Chordata
- Clade: Sarcopterygii
- Class: Dipnoi
- Family: †Phaneropleuridae
- Genus: †Nielsenia; Lehman, 1959

Type species
- †Nielsenia nordica Lehman, 1959

Extinct genus of fishes

Nielsenia is an extinct genus of prehistoric lungfish which lived during the Devonian period in what is now Greenland. It is named after Eigil Nielsen.
