= Arctacanthus =

Arctacanthus Temporal range: Wuchiapingian

Scientific classification
- Kingdom: Animalia
- Phylum: Chordata
- Class: Chondrichthyes
- Order: †Hybodontiformes
- Superfamily: †Hybodontoidea
- Genus: †Arctacanthus; Nielsen, 1932

Type species
- †Arctacanthus uncinatus Nielsen, 1932

Species
- †A. exiguus Yamagishi, 2004; †A. wyomingensis Branson, 1934

Synonyms
- Dolophonodus Branson, 1932

Extinct genus of fish

Arctacanthus is an extinct genus of cartilaginous fish from the Permian and possibly Triassic periods.

== Occurrence ==
Arctacanthus is known by two named species from the Permian, A. uncinatus and A. wyomingensis. The former was described from Greenland while the latter was described from the United States. They are known only by isolated hook-shaped "ichthyoliths" thought to represent dermal denticles of a chimaeran. Some have attributed these to teeth or hybodont cephalic spines. Similar ichthyoliths of much smaller size have been found in Japan and China in rocks of Anisian age. The large difference in age, location, and size means their attribution to this genus is uncertain; nonetheless, the species A. exiguus was named in Japan.
