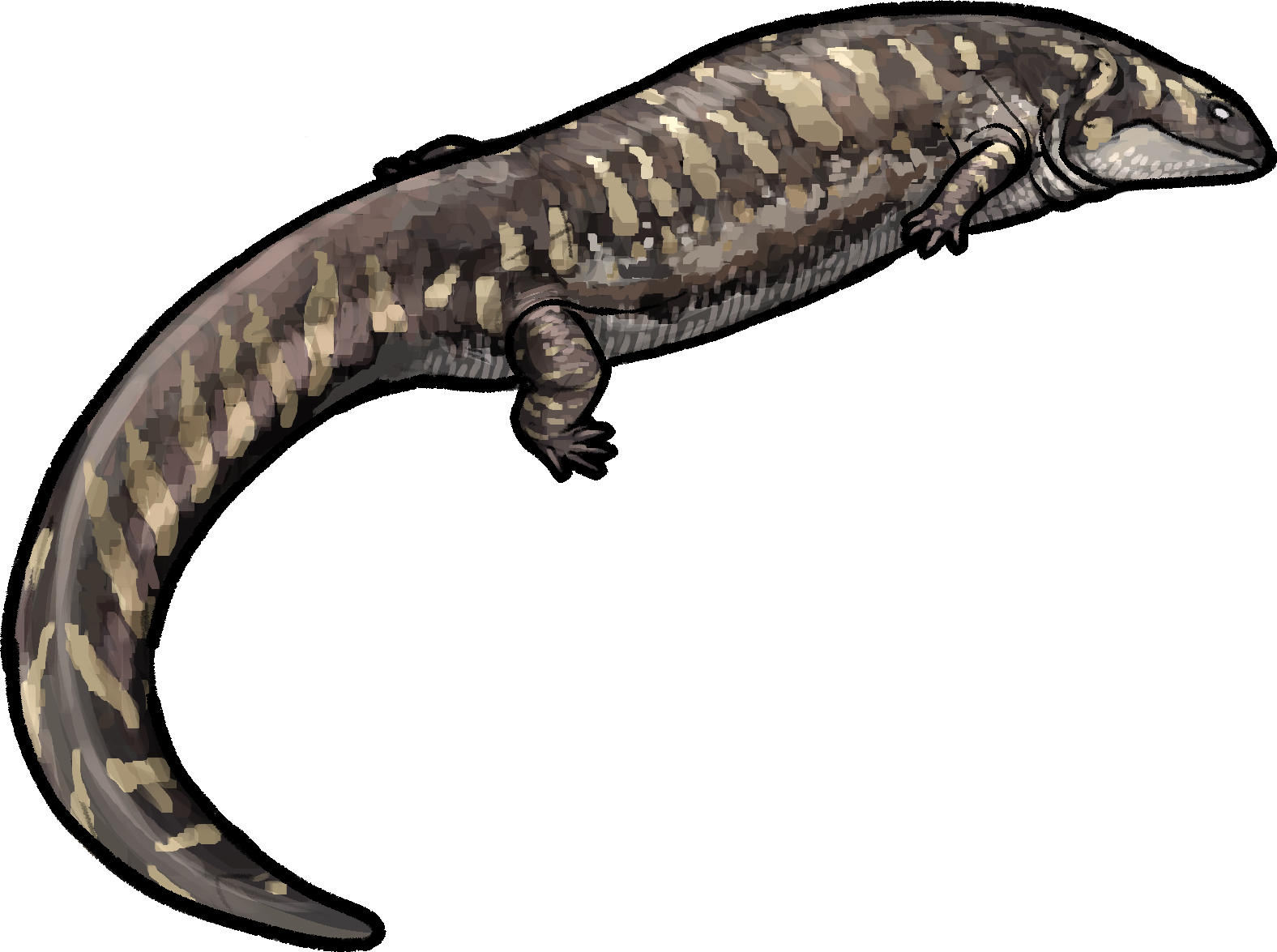
- Life Restoration

Scientific classification
- Kingdom: Animalia
- Phylum: Chordata
- Order: †Temnospondyli
- Suborder: †Dvinosauria
- Family: †Kourerpetidae
- Genus: †Kourerpeton Olson and Lammers, 1976

Species
- †K. bradyi Olson and Lammers, 1976 (type)

= Kourerpeton =

Kourerpeton Temporal range: Permian or Early Triassic

Extinct genus of amphibians

Kourerpeton is an extinct genus of dvinosaurian temnospondyl. Fossils of Kourerpeton were discovered in a window of a barber's shop in either Bisbee or Mesa, Arizona. Kourerpeton was named in 1976, with the type and only species being K. bradyi. It was originally assigned to the monotypic family Kourerpetidae, which has been alternatively spelled Kourerpetontidae.

== Age and location ==
Because it was not found in situ, the provenance and age of Kourerpeton is unknown. The fossils are rumored to have been from the Glen Rose Formation near Glen Rose, Texas. Olson and Lammers (1976) discredited this idea because they noted that the Glen Rose Formation is Cretaceous in age, and therefore not a likely source for a temnospondyl.^{[a]} Several studies have claimed that it is Permian or Early Triassic in age. Warren (1999) suggested that Kourerpeton is from an unknown Guadalupian (Middle Permian) to Early Triassic locality in North America, or possibly even from a locality outside North America. Milner and Sequeira (2004) have proposed that Kourerpeton may have been from the Early Permian San Angelo Formation in Texas, which has also been the source of the tupilakosaurid Slaugenhopia. The San Angelo Formation is in close proximity to the Glen Rose Formation, occurring in a north–south belt across north-central Texas about 80 miles (130 km) west of Glen Rose.

== Classification ==
Kourerpeton is usually classified in its own dvinosaurian family, the Kourerpetidae. Milner and Sequeira (2004) suggested that Kourerpeton may be a tupilakosaurid based on similarities with the genus Slaugenhopia. Like Slaugenhopia, Kourerpeton possesses enlarged postorbitals and reduced postfrontals, bones that form the portion of the skull roof above the eye sockets. Both Kourerpeton and Slaugenhopia possess incomplete-ring intercentra, which form the cenra of vertebrae. The pleurocentra, which also comprise the centra, are slender and crescentic in both genera. Unlike Slaugenhopia, Kourerpeton lacks an incisure, or notch, on the pterygoid bone of the palate. In Slaugenhopia, this incisure appears as a deep notch in the posterior margin of the central palate. In Kourerpeton, the posterior edge of the skull table is strongly undulated, and has a medial concavity. This is unlike Slaugenhopia, which has a relatively straight skull roof margin. Based on these differences, Milner and Sequeira (2004) considered Kourerpeton to be a primitive stem-tupilakosaurid.

== See also ==
- Prehistoric amphibian
- List of prehistoric amphibians

== Notes ==
1. The only temnospondyl known from the Cretaceous is the chigutisaurid Koolasuchus, which was the latest surviving temnospondyl.
