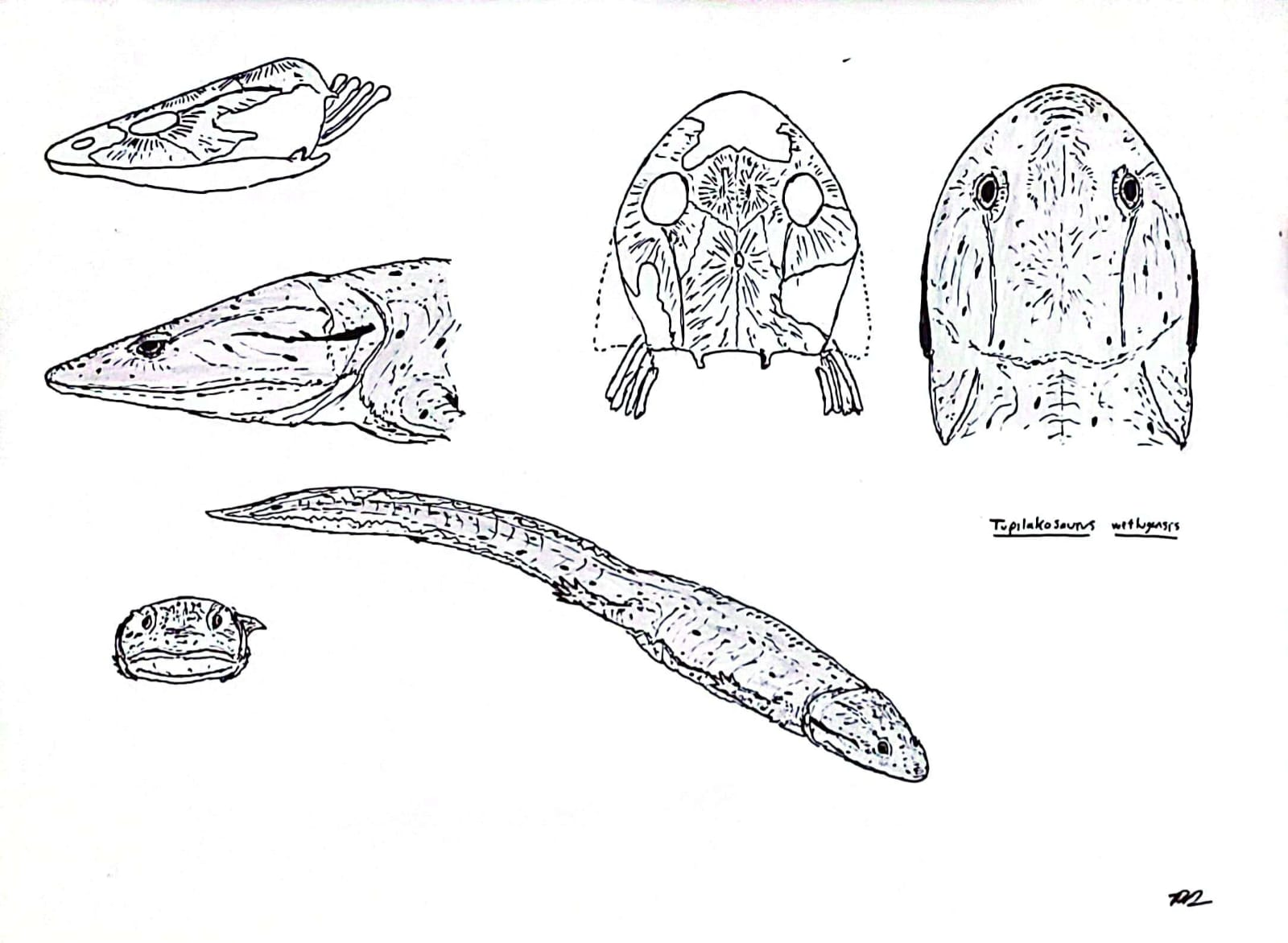
- Tupilakosaurus

Scientific classification
- Kingdom: Animalia
- Phylum: Chordata
- Clade: Tetrapoda
- Order: †Temnospondyli
- Suborder: †Dvinosauria
- Superfamily: †Dvinosauroidea
- Family: †Tupilakosauridae; Kuhn, 1960

Genera
- ?Kourerpeton; Slaugenhopia; Thabanchuia; Tupilakosaurus

= Tupilakosauridae =

Tupilakosauridae Temporal range: Early Permian - Early Triassic, 273–245 Ma

Extinct family of temnospondyls

Tupilakosauridae is an extinct family of dvinosaurian temnospondyls. It contains the genera Slaugenhopia, Thabanchuia, Tupilakosaurus, and possibly Kourerpeton. Tupilakosaurs are known from Texas, Greenland, Russia, and France. The earliest tupilakosaur, Slaugenhopia, is Early Permian in age while the latest known tupilakosaurs are Early Triassic in age. Derived tupilakosaurs possess embolomerous centra in their vertebrae, which are diplospondylous. They also have a deep notch in the pterygoid bone of the palate. Tupilakosaurs were aquatic, and used an undulatory mode of swimming much like that of eels.
