= Erpetosaurus =

Erpetosaurus Temporal range: Carboniferous (Kasimovian). 311.45–306.95 Ma

Scientific classification
- Kingdom: Animalia
- Phylum: Chordata
- Clade: Tetrapoda
- Order: †Temnospondyli
- Suborder: †Dvinosauria
- Family: †Eobrachyopidae
- Genus: †Erpetosaurus; Moodie, 1909

Extinct genus of amphibians

Erpetosaurus is an extinct genus of dvinosaurian temnospondyl within the family Eobrachyopidae. Erpetosaurus is only known from the Upper Freeport Coal, Allegheny Group, Middle Pennsylvanian of Linton, Ohio, USA. Some unique features of the temnospondyls are that they have a single fang on each premaxilla on the anterior maxilla for the reception of two dentary fangs; and an elongate, tube-like backside extension of the parasphenoid, both hinting to an aquatic hunting lifestyle.

== See also ==
- Prehistoric amphibian
- List of prehistoric amphibians

== Sources ==
1. https://www.palass.org/publications/special-papers-palaeontology/archive/86/article_pp57-73
2. https://kb.osu.edu/dspace/bitstream/handle/1811/23240/V088N1_055.pdf
3. Paleobiology Database
