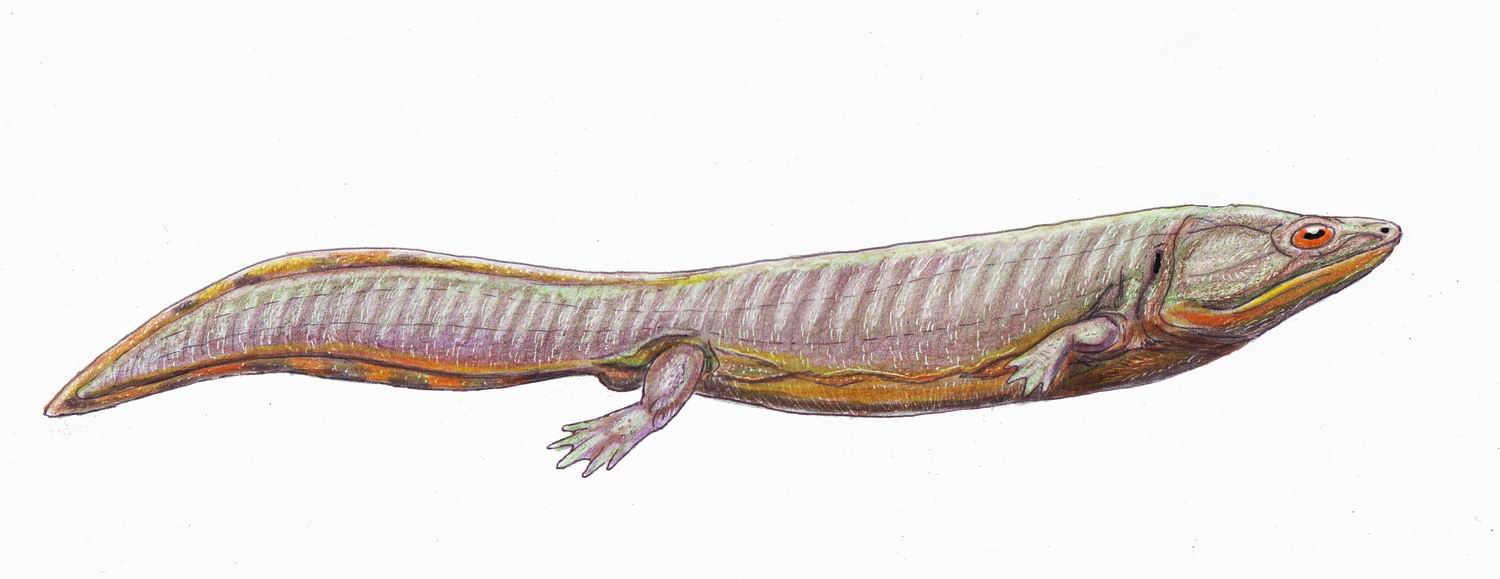
- Dvinosaurus primus

Scientific classification
- Kingdom: Animalia
- Phylum: Chordata
- Clade: Tetrapoda
- Order: †Temnospondyli
- Suborder: †Dvinosauria; Yates and Warren, 2000

Subgroups
- †Trimerorhachidae; †Perryella; †Timonya; †Trypanognathus; †Dvinosauroidea; †Acroplous; †Bermanerpeton; †Dvinosaurus; †Erpetosaurus?; †Isodectes; †Kourerpeton; †Tupilakosauridae

= Dvinosauria =

Dvinosauria Temporal range: Late Carboniferous - Early Triassic, 279.5–251.3 Ma

Extinct suborder of temnospondyls

Dvinosaurs are one of several new clades of temnospondyls named in the phylogenetic review of the group by Yates and Warren 2000. They represent a group of primitive semi-aquatic to completely aquatic temnospondyls, and are known from the Late Carboniferous to the Early Triassic, being most common in the Permian period. Their distinguishing characteristics are a reduction of the otic notch; the loss of a flange on the rear side of the pterygoid; and 28 or more presacral vertebrae.

Trimerorhachidae is the most basal family of dvinosaurs. Most other dvinosaurs are placed in the superfamily Dvinosauroidea. Within Dvinosauroidea are two families, Eobrachyopidae and Tupilakosauridae, as well as dvinosaurs that cannot be placed in either family, such as Dvinosaurus and Kourerpeton. A 2008 phylogenetic analysis found Eobrachyopidae to be paraphyletic, representing a grade of basal dvinosauroids. Below is a cladogram showing the phylogenetic relationships of dvinosaurs from Englehorn et al. (2008):

- Dvinosauria
  - Trimerorhachidae
    - Trimerorhachis
    - Neldasaurus
  - - Perryella
    - Dvinosauroidea
      - Isodectes (Eobrachyopidae)
      - - Acroplous (Eobrachyopidae)
        - - Dvinosauridae
          - Kourerpetidae
          - Tupilakosauridae
            - Slaugenhopia
            - Tupilakosaurus
            - Thabanchuia
