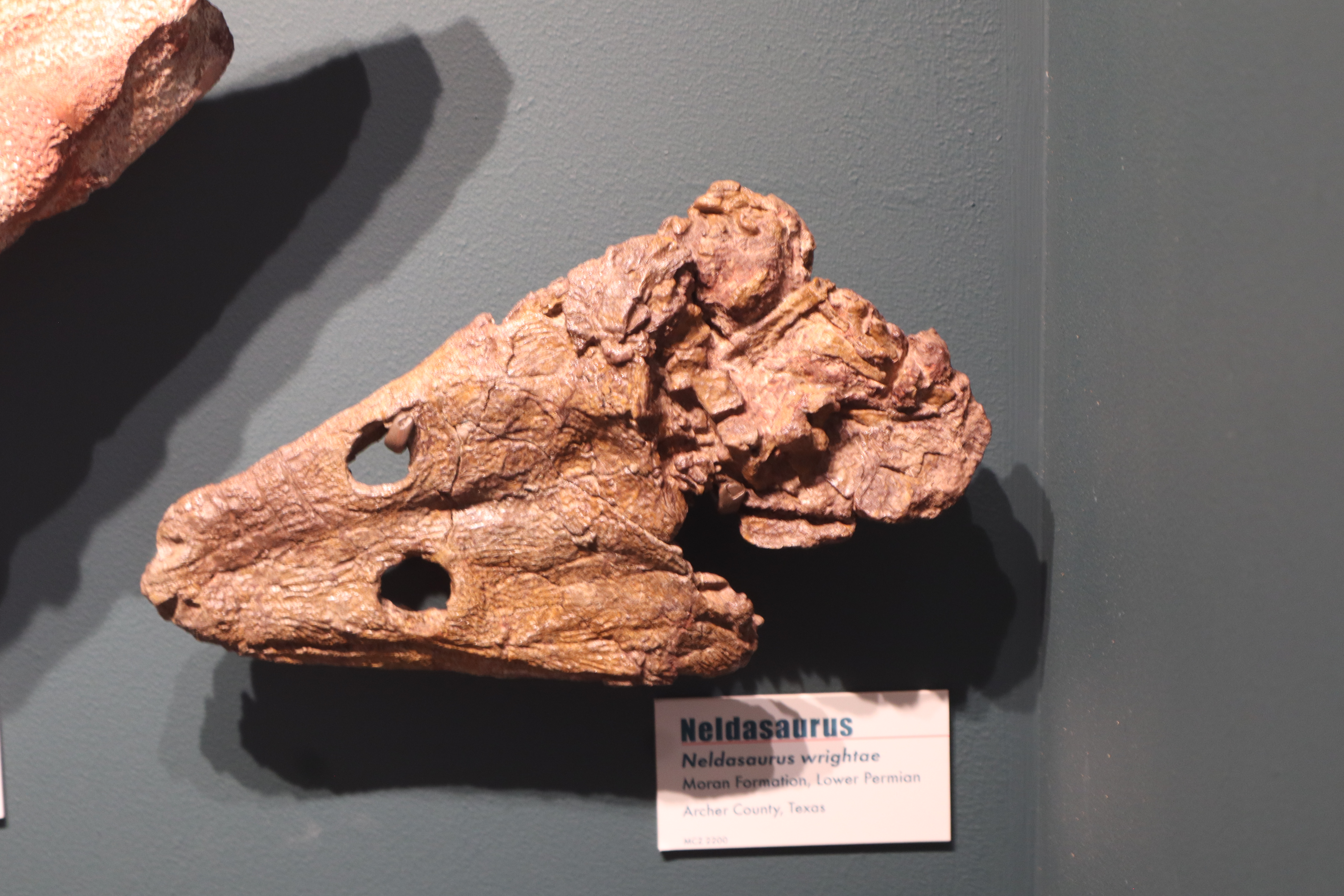
- Skull of N. wrightae, Harvard Museum of Natural History

Scientific classification
- Kingdom: Animalia
- Phylum: Chordata
- Clade: Tetrapoda
- Order: †Temnospondyli
- Suborder: †Dvinosauria
- Family: †Trimerorhachidae
- Genus: †Neldasaurus; Chase, 1965

Type species
- †Neldasaurus wrightae Chase, 1965

= Neldasaurus =

Neldasaurus Temporal range: Early Permian, 296.4–272.5 Ma

Extinct genus of amphibians

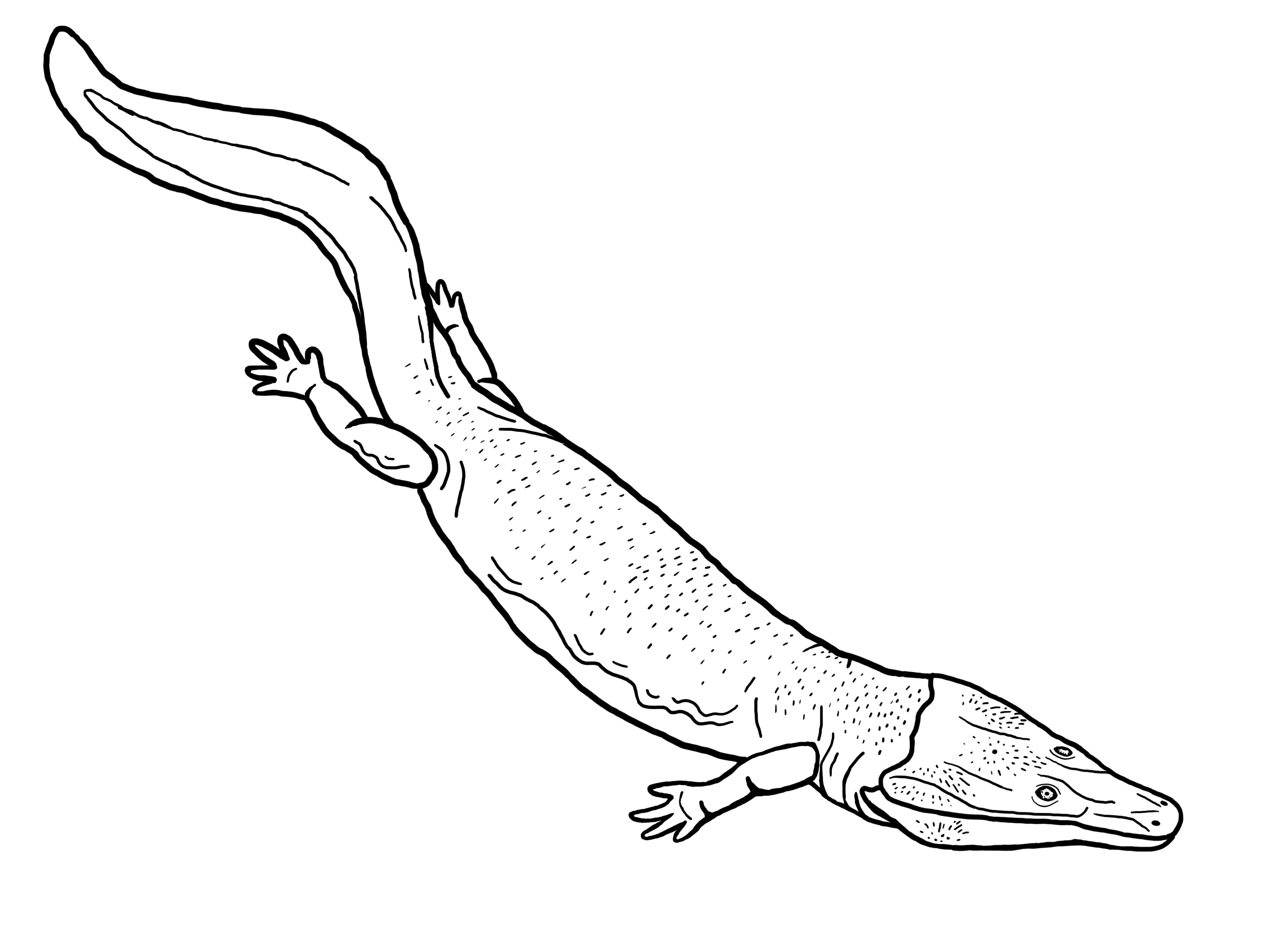
Life restoration

Neldasaurus is an extinct genus of dvinosaurian temnospondyl within the family Trimerorhachidae.
