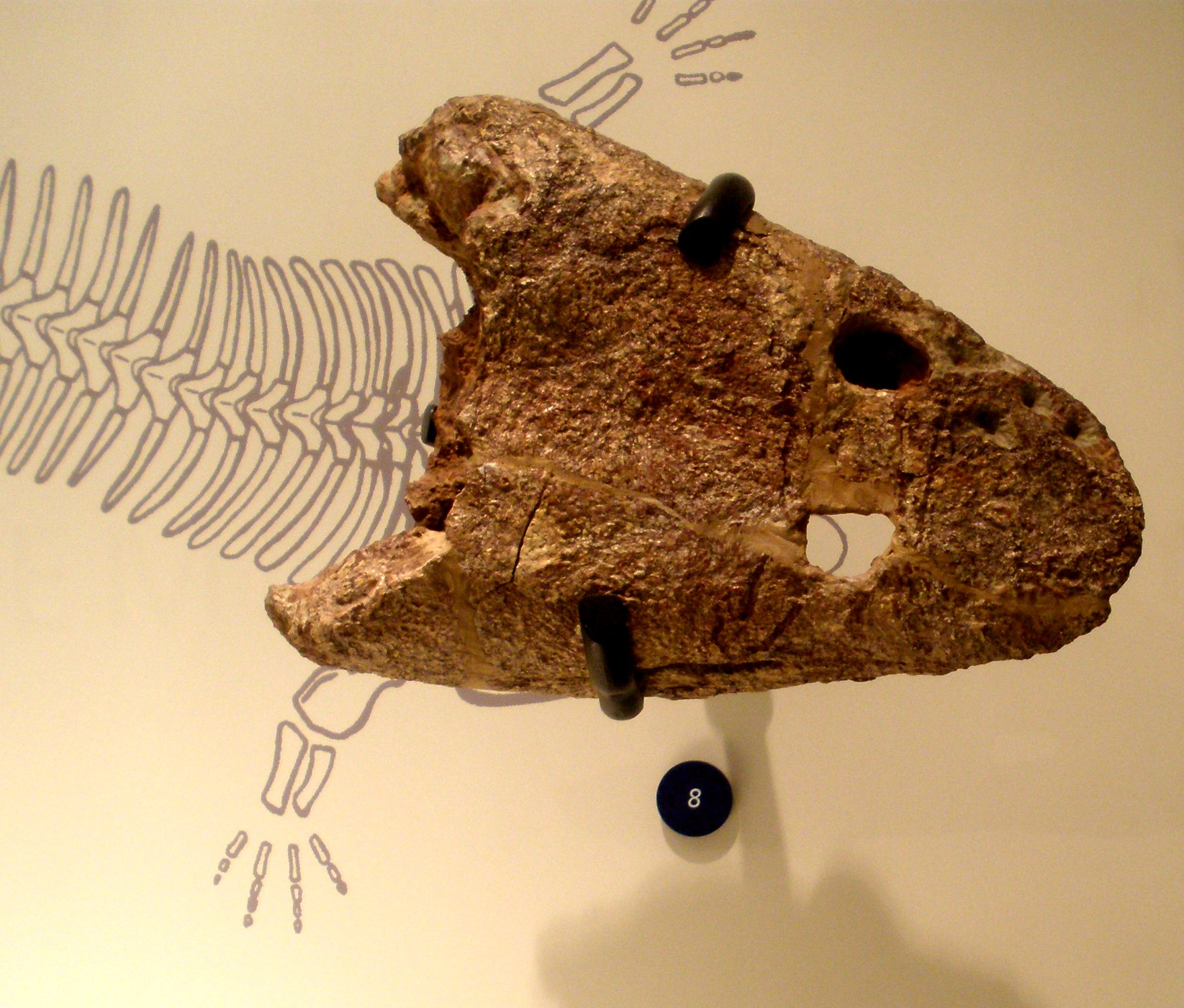
- Skull of Trimerorhachis insignis

Scientific classification
- Kingdom: Animalia
- Phylum: Chordata
- Clade: Tetrapoda
- Order: †Temnospondyli
- Suborder: †Dvinosauria
- Family: †Trimerorhachidae; Cope, 1882

= Trimerorhachidae =

Extinct family of temnospondyls

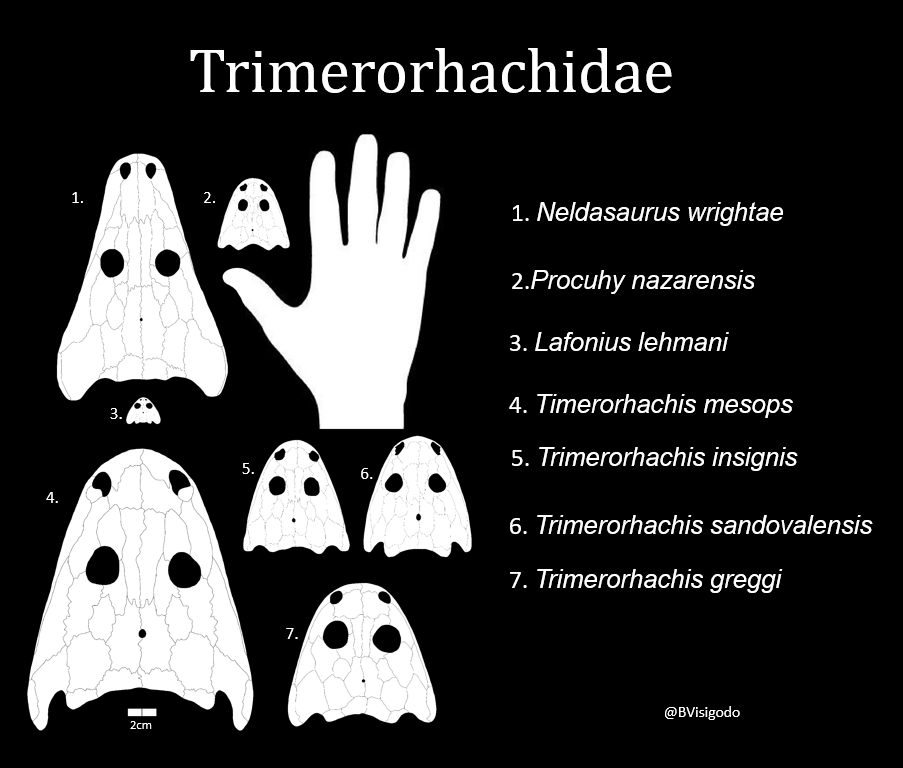
Diagram of trimerorhachid skulls

Trimerorhachidae is a family of dvinosaurian temnospondyls, including Lafonius, Trimerorhachis, Procuhy and Neldasaurus.

They were semiaquatic carnivores that lived from the Late Carboniferous to the Early Permian.

== Gallery ==
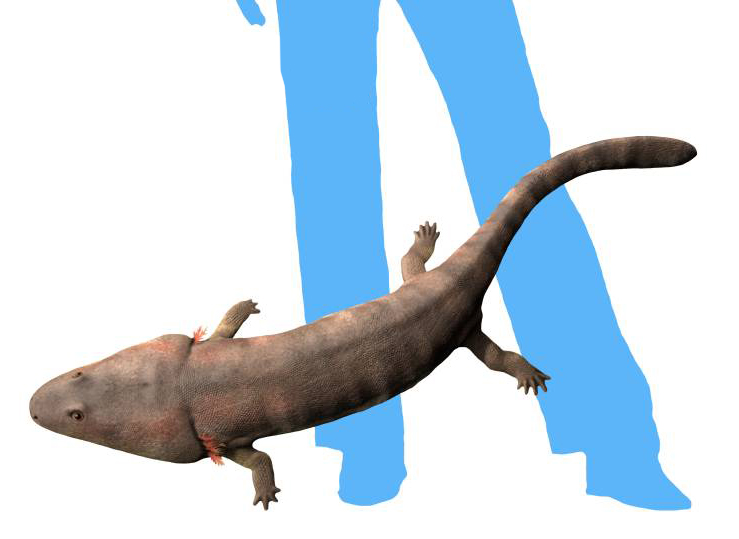
Trimerorhachis insignis, of the early Permian of Texas

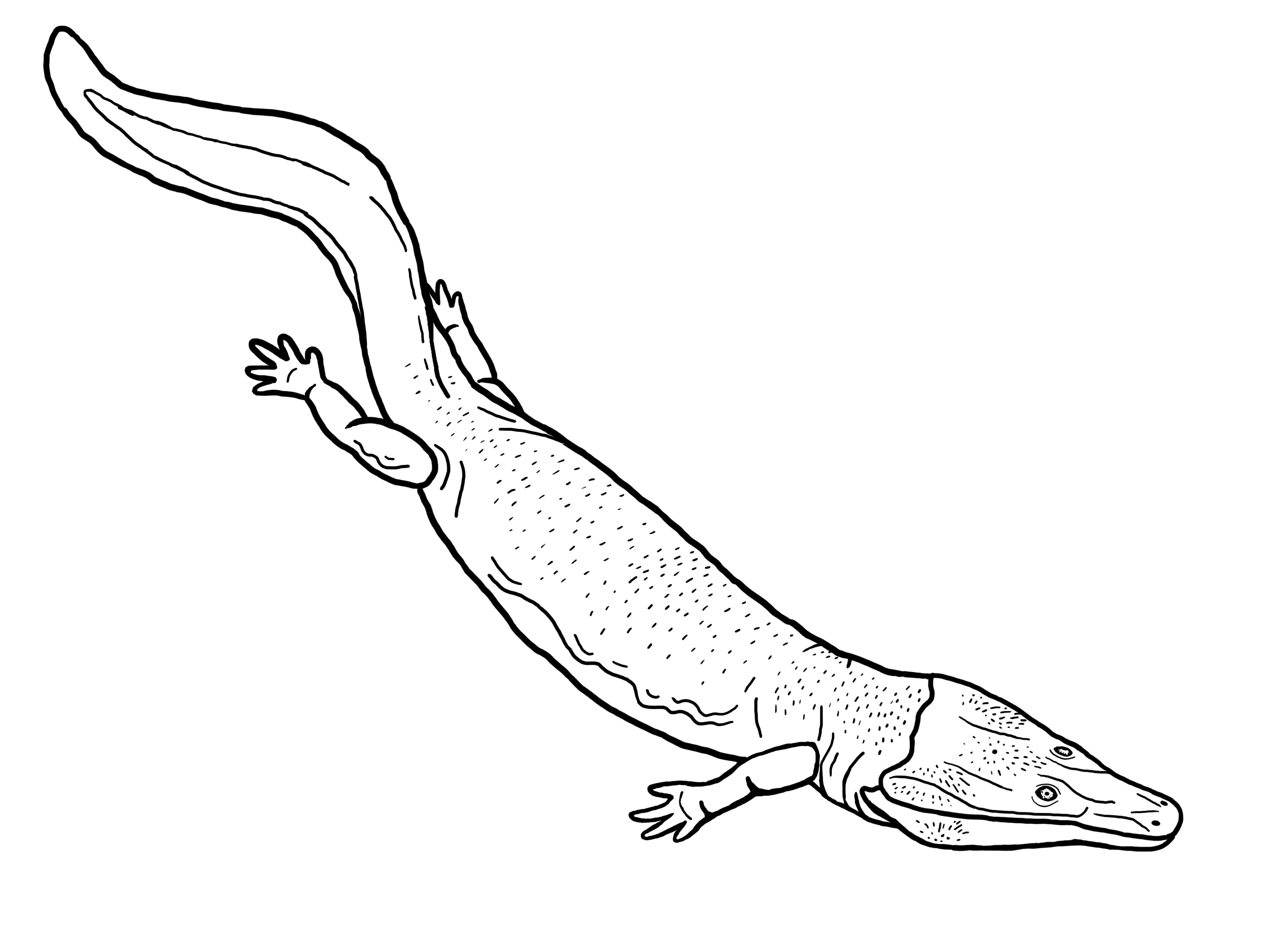
Neldasaurus wrightae, of the early Permian of Texas

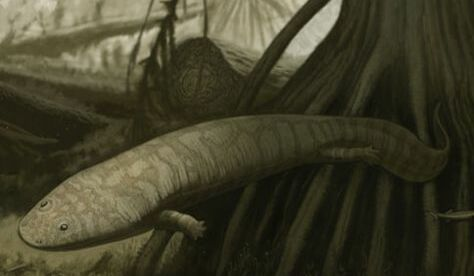
Procuhy nazariensis, of the early Permian of Brazil
