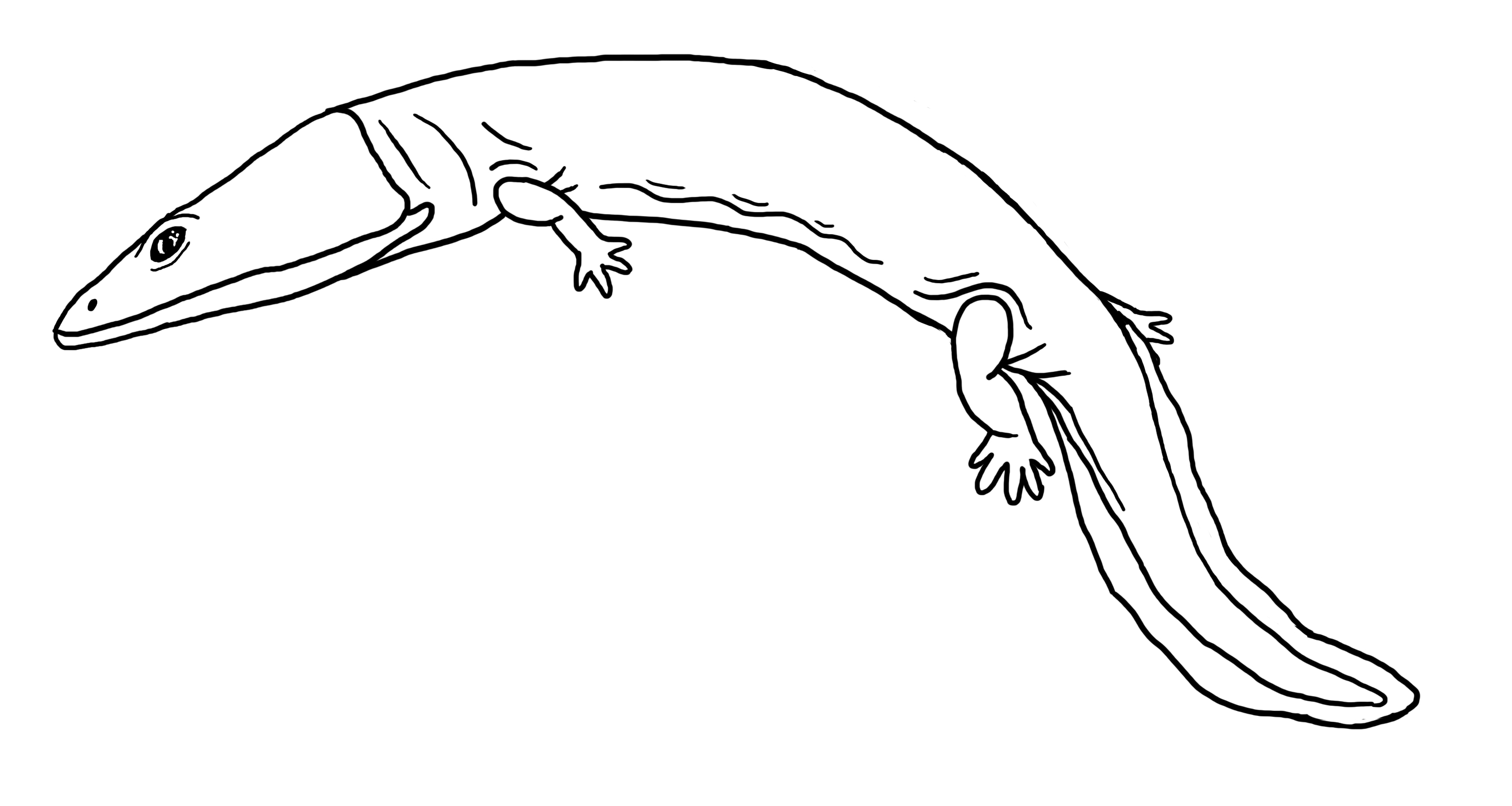
- Restoration of Isodectes obtusus

Scientific classification
- Kingdom: Animalia
- Phylum: Chordata
- Clade: Tetrapoda
- Order: †Temnospondyli
- Suborder: †Dvinosauria
- Family: †Eobrachyopidae
- Genus: †Isodectes; Cope, 1896

Type species
- †Isodectes obtusus (Cope, 1896 [originally Dendrerpeton obtusus])

Synonyms
- Saurerpeton Moodie, 1909

= Isodectes =

Isodectes Temporal range: Early Permian

Extinct genus of amphibians

Isodectes is an extinct genus of dvinosaurian temnospondyl within the family Eobrachyopidae. The genus Saurerpeton, named in 1909, is considered to be a junior synonym of Isodectes.
