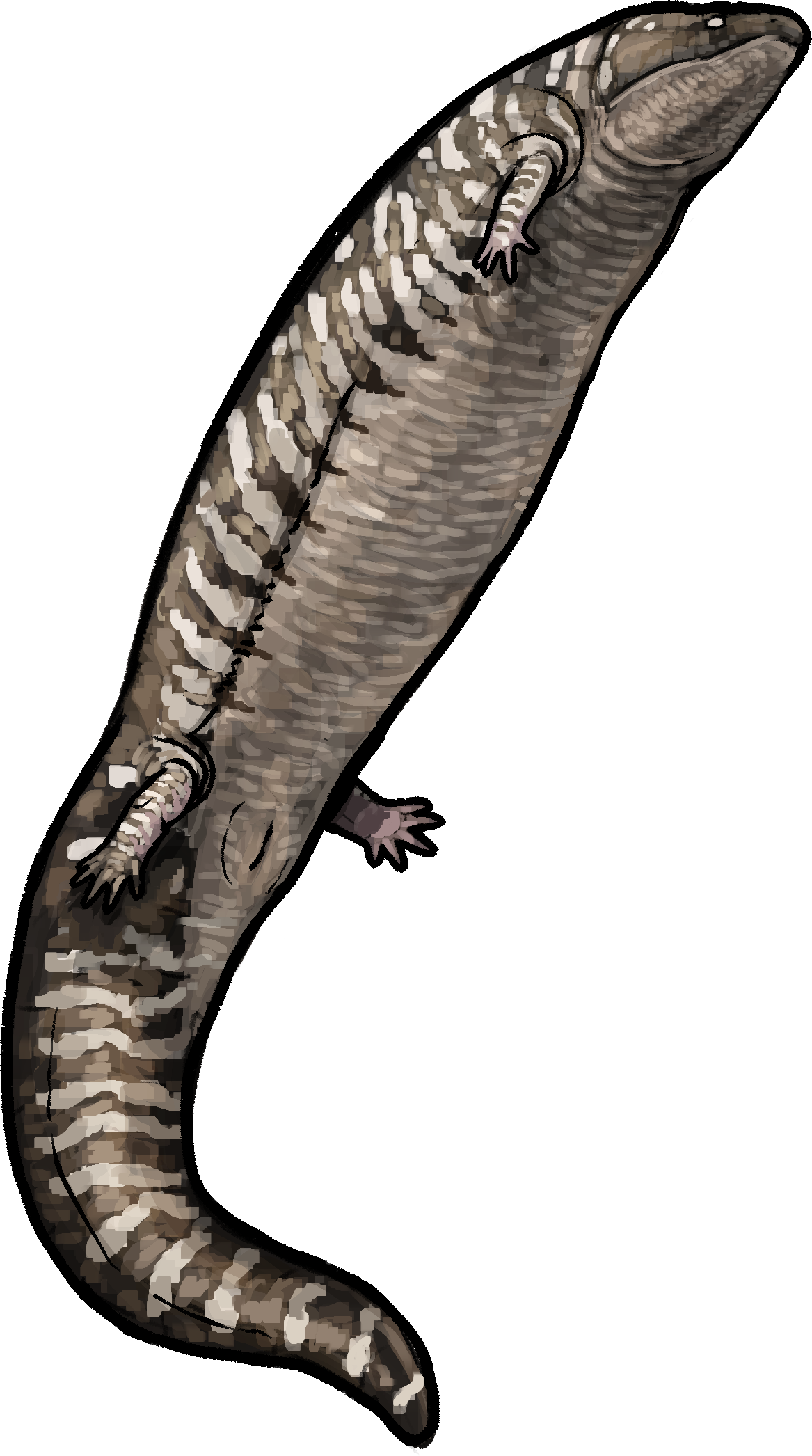
- Life Restoration

Scientific classification
- Kingdom: Animalia
- Phylum: Chordata
- Clade: Tetrapoda
- Order: †Temnospondyli
- Suborder: †Dvinosauria
- Family: †Tupilakosauridae
- Genus: †Thabanchuia; Warren, 1998

Type species
- †Thabanchuia oomie Warren, 1998

= Thabanchuia =

Thabanchuia Temporal range: Early Triassic, 252.3–251.3 Ma

Extinct genus of amphibians

Thabanchuia is an extinct genus of dvinosaurian temnospondyl within the family Tupilakosauridae. It is known from the Lystrosaurus Assemblage Zone in Thaba N'chu, Free State, South Africa. The genus contains just one species, Thabanchuia oomie, the type species.

== See also ==
- Prehistoric amphibian
- List of prehistoric amphibians
