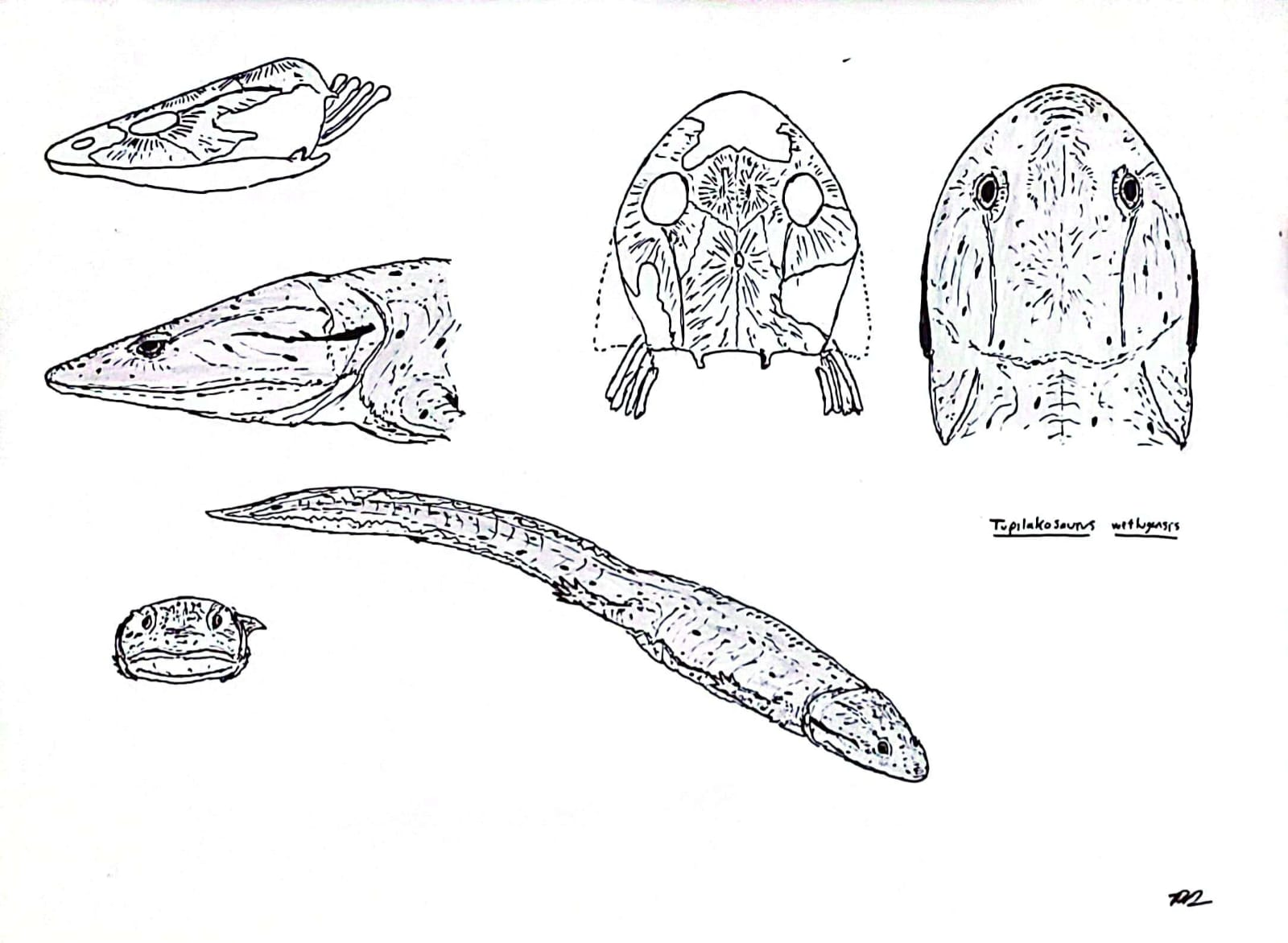

Scientific classification
- Kingdom: Animalia
- Phylum: Chordata
- Clade: Tetrapoda
- Order: †Temnospondyli
- Suborder: †Dvinosauria
- Family: †Tupilakosauridae
- Genus: †Tupilakosaurus; Nielsen, 1954

Type species
- †Tupilakosaurus heilmani Nielsen, 1954

= Tupilakosaurus =

Tupilakosaurus Temporal range: Induan, 252.3–251.3 Ma

Extinct genus of amphibians

Tupilakosaurus is an extinct genus of dvinosaurian temnospondyl within the family Tupilakosauridae.

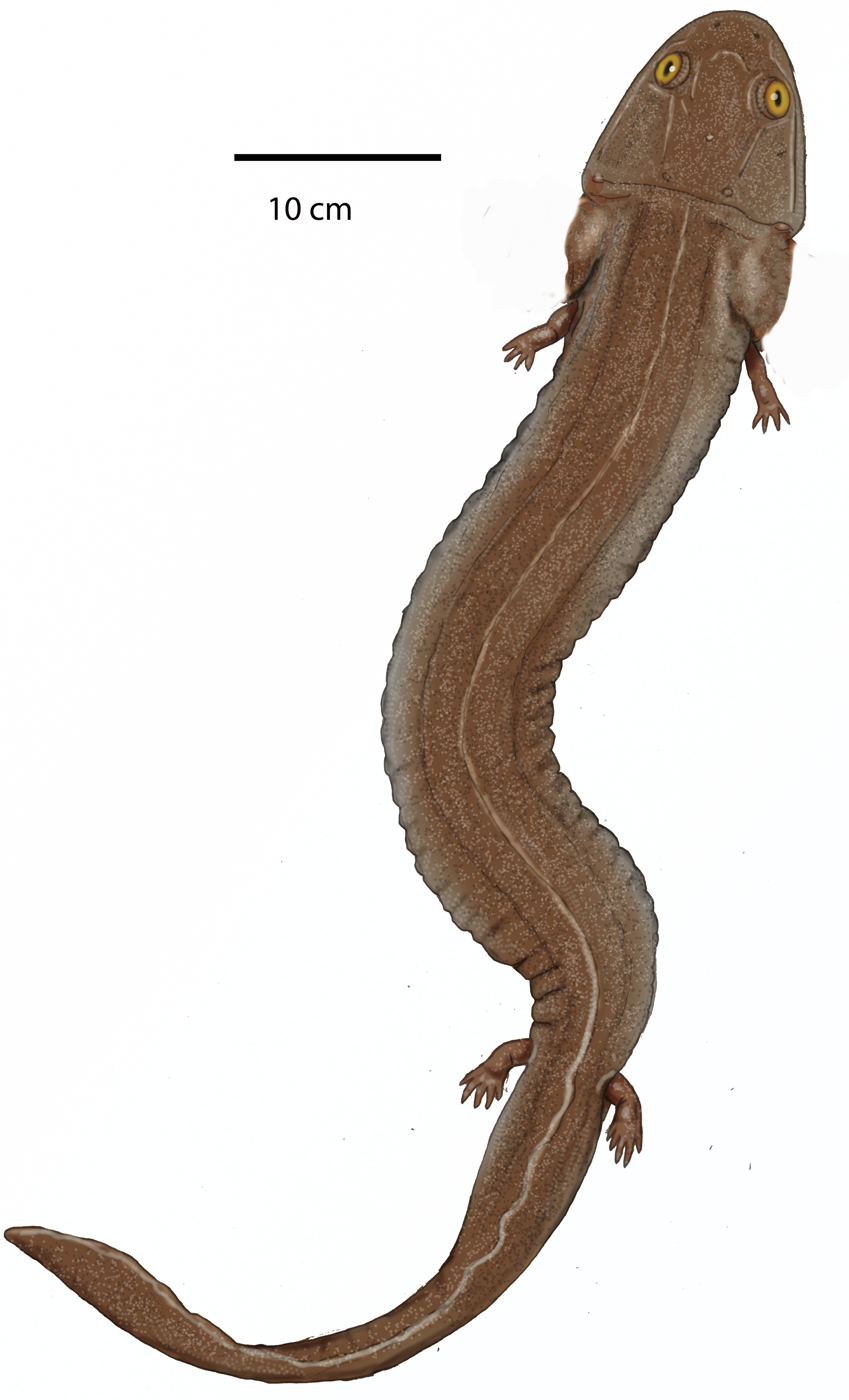
Life restoration

Two species are known:

- Tupilakosaurus heilmani Nielsen, 1954 — Wordie Creek Formation, Greenland
- Tupilakosaurus wetlugensis Shishkin, 1961 — Vokhma and Kopanskaya Formation, Nizhny Novgorod Oblast, Russia

== See also ==
- Prehistoric amphibian
- List of prehistoric amphibians
