= List of the prehistoric life of Texas =

This list of the prehistoric life of Texas contains the various prehistoric life-forms whose fossilized remains have been reported from within the US state of Texas.

== Precambrian ==
The Paleobiology Database records no known occurrences of Precambrian fossils in Texas

== Paleozoic ==
=== Selected Paleozoic taxa of Texas ===
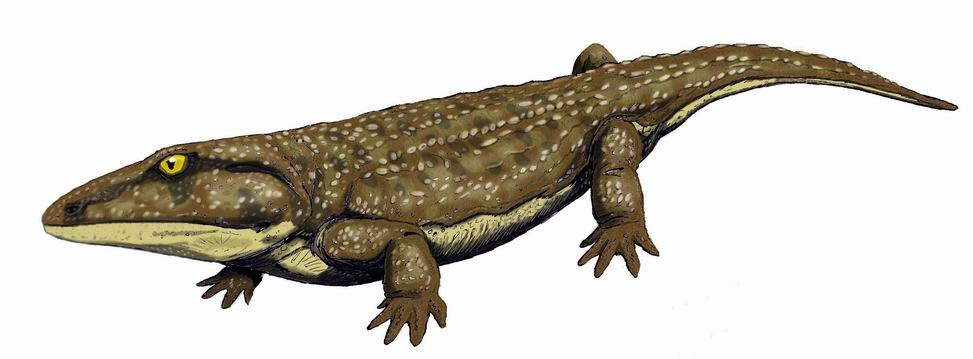
- Restoration of the Permian amphibian Acheloma
  †Acheloma – type locality for genus
  - †Acheloma cumminsi – type locality for species
- †Achistrum
  - †Achistrum ludwigi – type locality for species
- †Acrodus – tentative report
  - †Acrodus olsoni – type locality for species
  - †Acrodus sweetlacruzensis – type locality for species
- †Actinoconchus
- †Acutichiton
- †Adamantina
- †Adrianites – tentative report
- †Agathiceras
  - †Agathiceras applini – type locality for species
- †Alegeinosaurus
- †Alethopteris
- †Almites
- †Altudoceras
- †Alveus – type locality for genus
- †Amphiscapha
- †Amplexus – report made of unidentified related form or using admittedly obsolete nomenclature
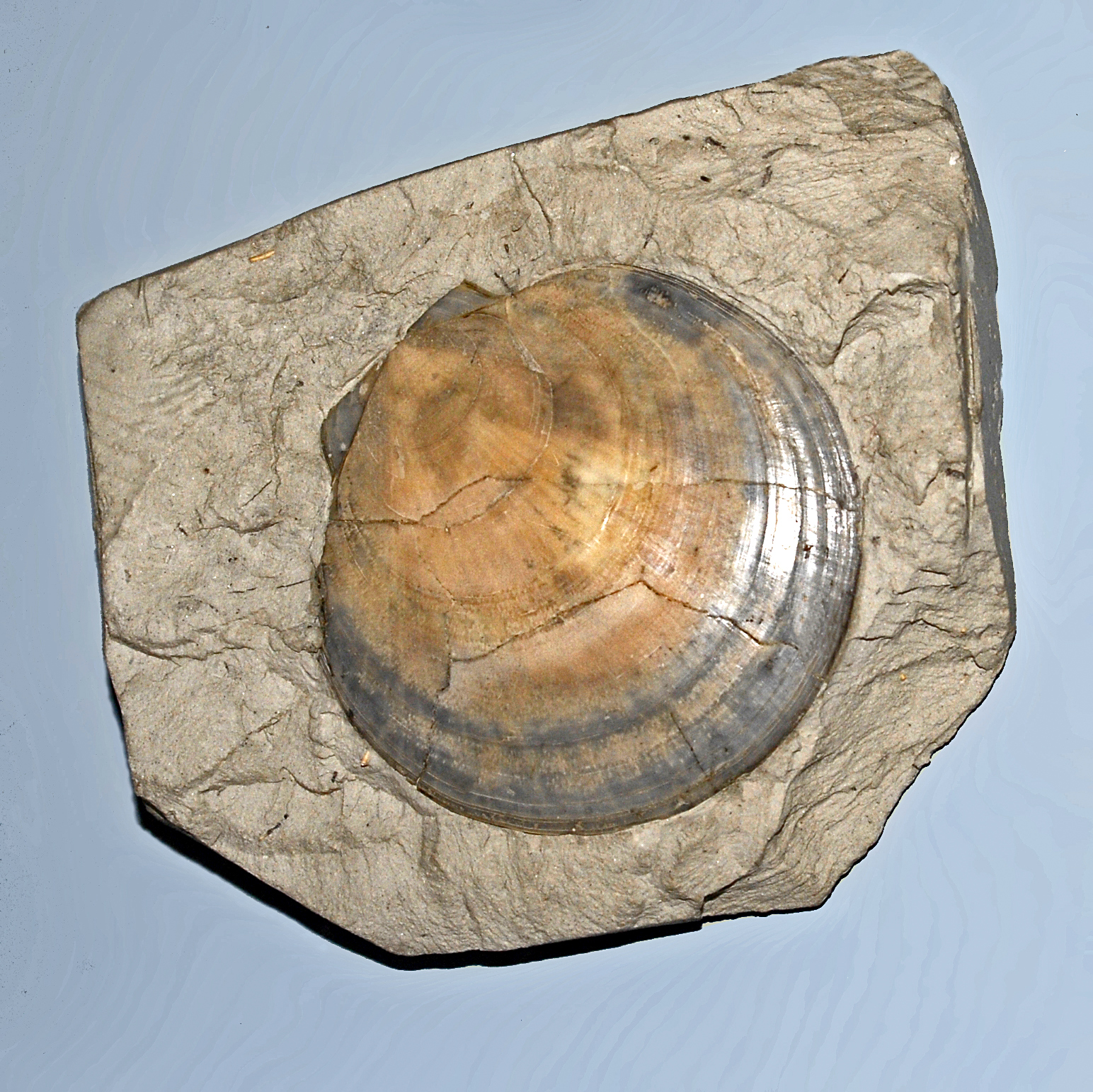
- Fossilized shell of the Carboniferous-modern scallop Amusium
  Amusium – tentative report
- †Ananias
- †Anatsabites
- †Angelosaurus – type locality for genus
  - †Angelosaurus dolani – type locality for species
- †Anisodexis
- †Annularia
  - †Annularia stellata – or unidentified comparable form
- †Anomalesia
- †Anomphalus
- †Aphetoceras
- †Aphlebia
- †Apsisaurus – type locality for genus
  - †Apsisaurus witteri – type locality for species
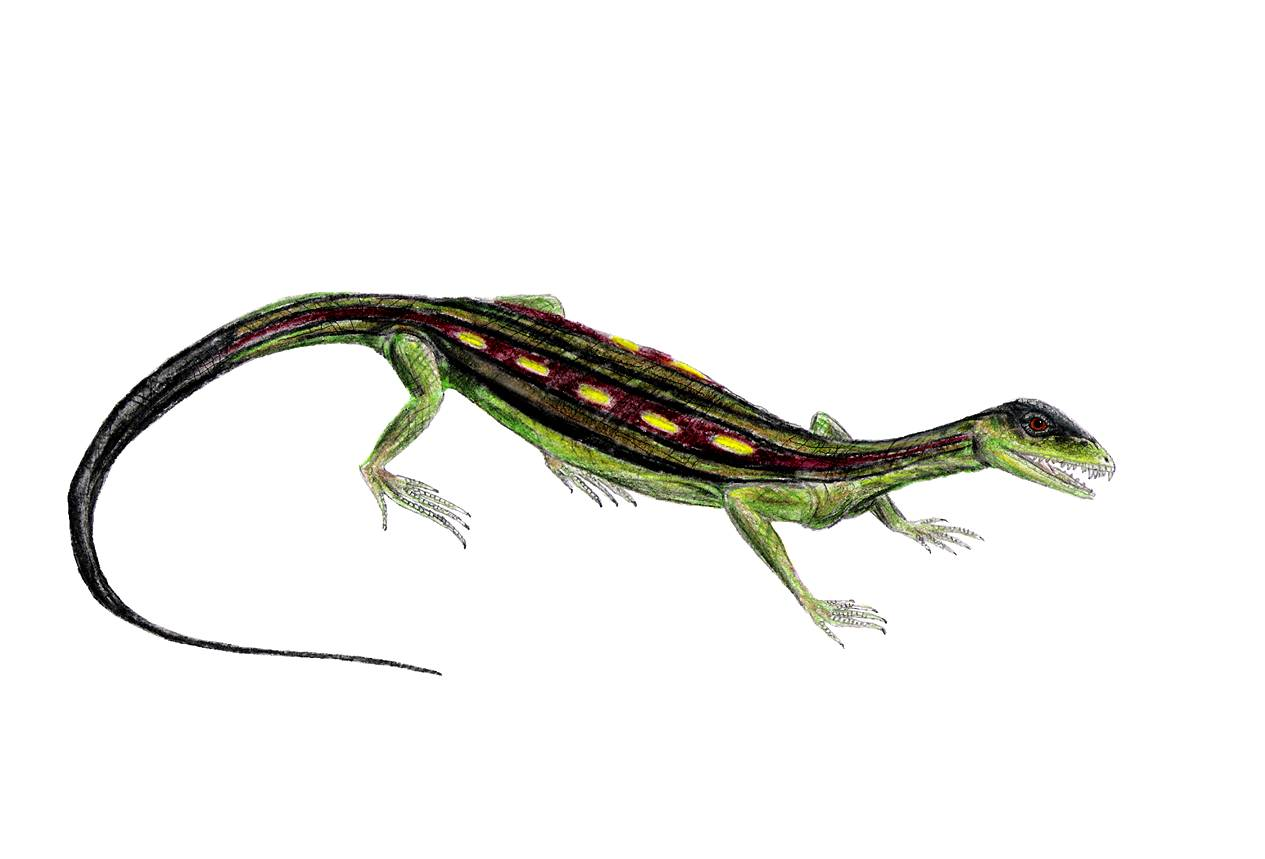
- Life restoration of the Permian reptile Araeoscelis
  †Araeoscelis – type locality for genus
- †Archaeocidaris
- Archaeolithophyllum
- †Archeria – type locality for genus
  - †Archeria crassidisca – type locality for species
- †Archimedes
- †Arcuolimbus
- †Aristoceras
- †Armenoceras
- †Artisia
- †Aspidosaurus – type locality for genus
- †Athyris
- †Aulopora – report made of unidentified related form or using admittedly obsolete nomenclature
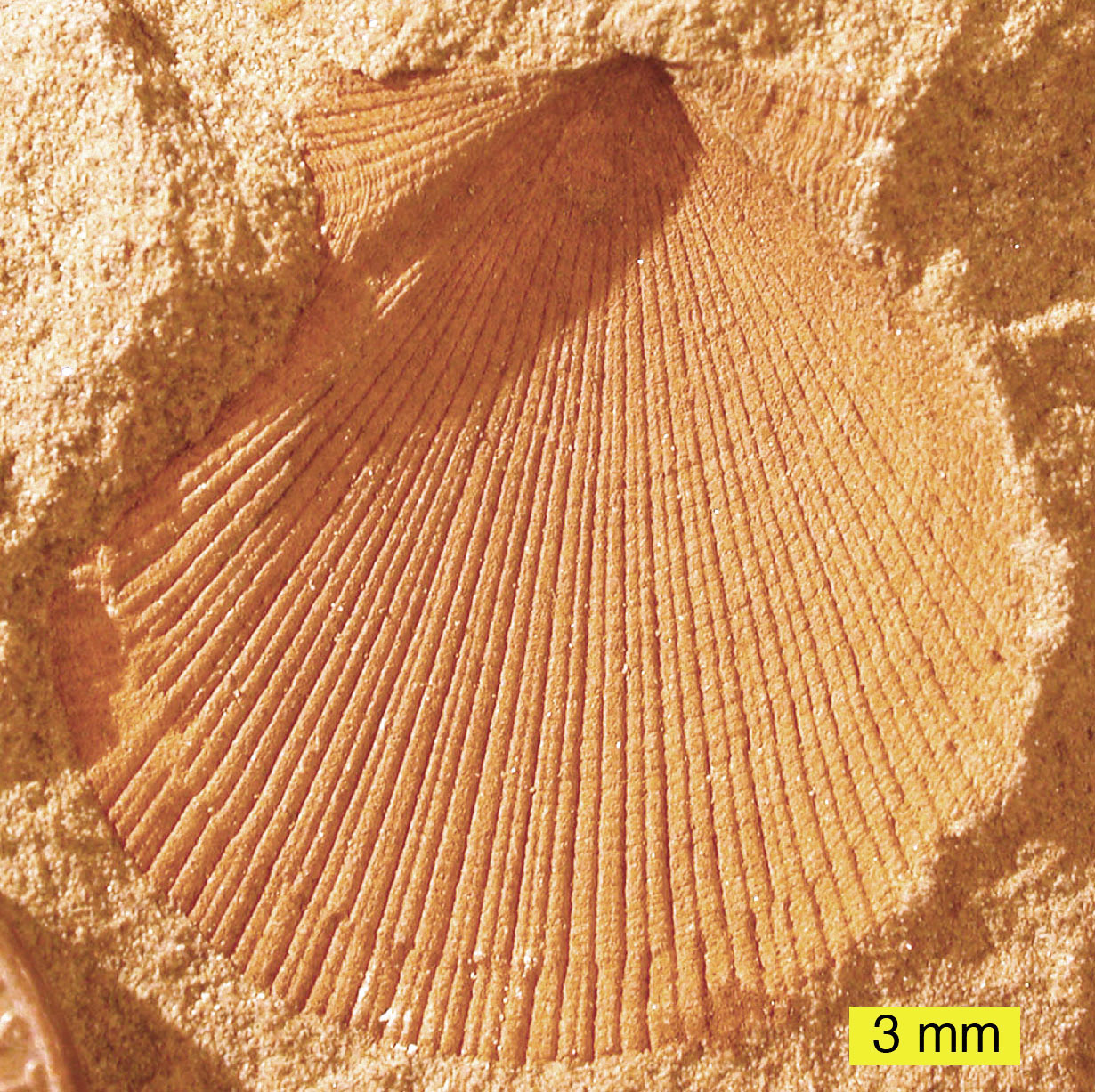
- Mold fossil of a shell of the Early Devonian-Late Triassic bivalve Aviculopecten
  †Aviculopecten
  - †Aviculopecten ballingerana
  - †Aviculopecten girtyi – type locality for species
  - †Aviculopecten gryphus – type locality for species
  - †Aviculopecten occidentalis
  - †Aviculopecten sumnerensis
- †Avonia
- †Barnesoceras – type locality for genus
- †Bathyglyptus – type locality for genus
- †Bellerophon – tentative report
- †Bellerophon
  - †Bellerophon graphicus
- †Bembexia
- †Bitaunioceras
- †Blountiella
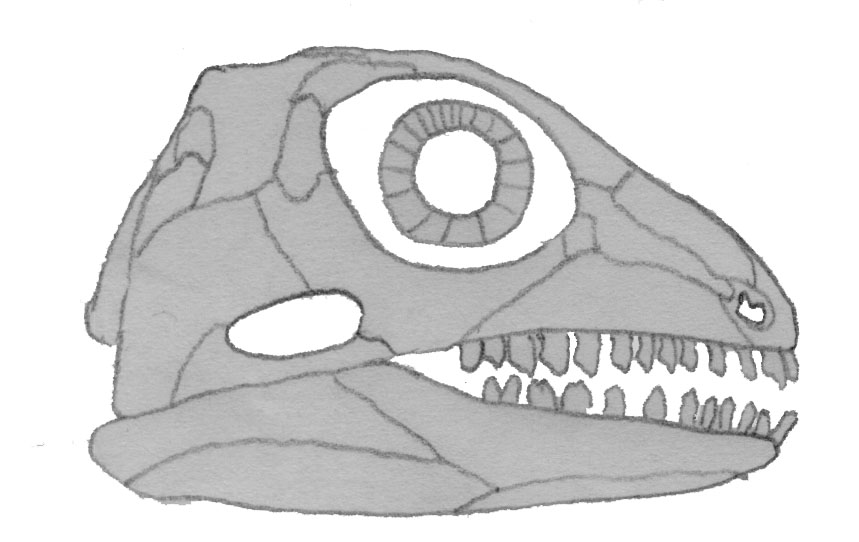
- Illustration of a fossilized skull of the Permian primitive reptile Bolosaurus
  †Bolosaurus – type locality for genus
  - †Bolosaurus major – type locality for species
  - †Bolosaurus striatus – type locality for species
- †Brachydectes
- †Brachyphyllum – tentative report
- †Branneroceras
- †Broiliellus – type locality for genus
  - †Broiliellus brevis – type locality for species
  - †Broiliellus olsoni – type locality for species
  - †Broiliellus texensis – type locality for species
- †Burenoceras
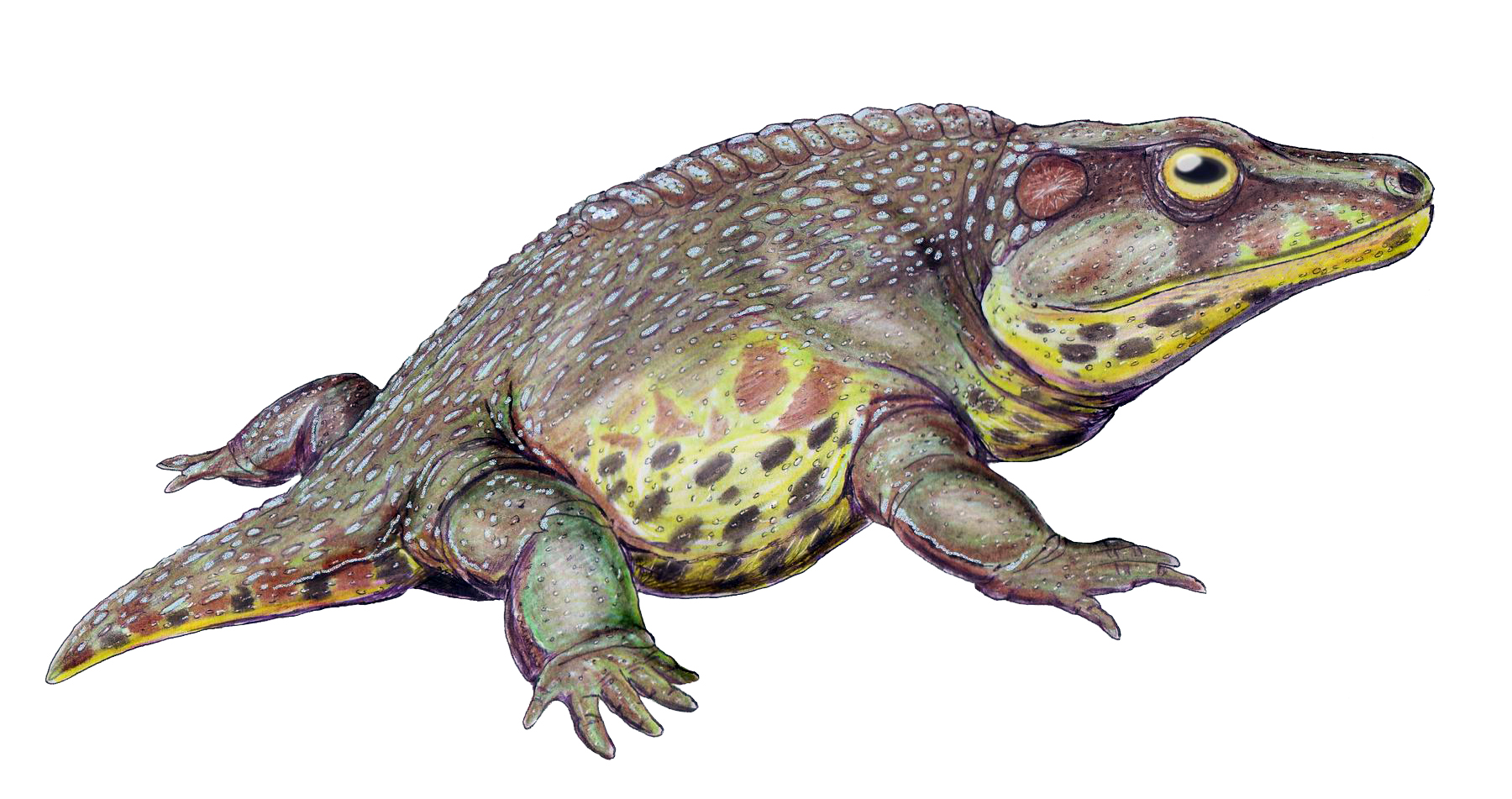
- Life restoration of the Permian amphibian Cacops
  †Cacops
  - †Cacops aspidephorus – type locality for species
- †Calamites
  - †Calamites undulatus
- †Callipteridium
- †Callipteris
  - †Callipteris conferta
- †Calophyllum – tentative report
- †Camarotoechia
- †Captorhinus – type locality for genus
  - †Captorhinus aguti – type locality for species
- †Carbonicola
- †Cardiocephalus – type locality for genus
  - †Cardiocephalus sternbergi – type locality for species
- †Carrolla – type locality for genus
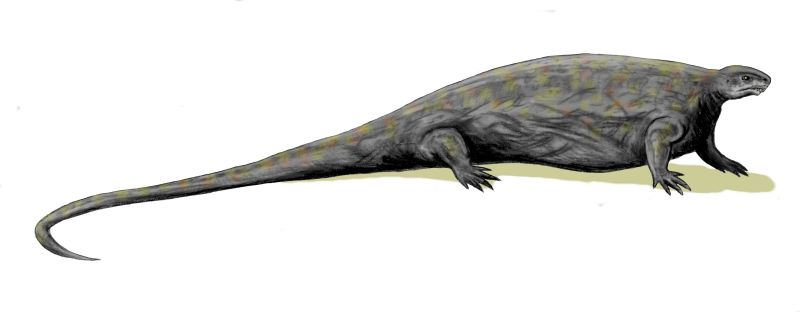
- Life restoration of the Permian synapsid (mammal precursor) Casea
  †Casea – type locality for genus
  - †Casea broilii – type locality for species
- †Caseoides – type locality for genus
- †Caseopsis
- †Cassiavellia – type locality for genus
  - †Cassiavellia galtarae – type locality for species
- †Catenipora
- †Cedaria
- †Chancelloria – tentative report
- †Chonetes
  - †Chonetes flemingi – tentative report
  - †Chonetes verneuilianus
- †Cibolites – type locality for genus
- †Clarkoceras
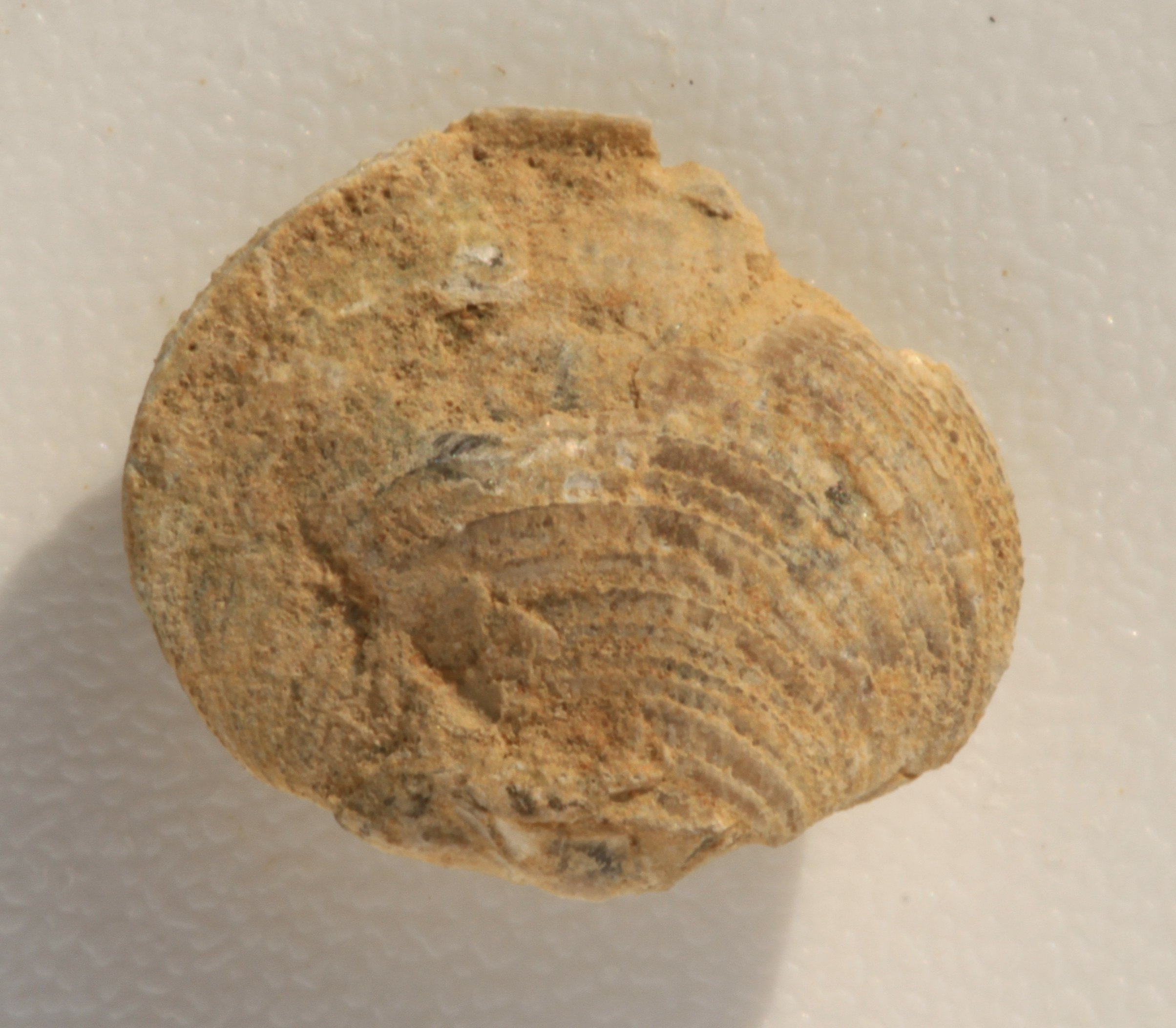
- Fossilized shell of the Middle Devonian-Permian brachiopod Cleiothyridina
  †Cleiothyridina
  - †Cleiothyridina mulsa
  - †Cleiothyridina nana
  - †Cleiothyridina pilularis
  - †Cleiothyridina rara
  - †Cleiothyridina rectimarginata – type locality for species
- †Climacograptus
- †Clitendoceras
- †Clonograptus
- †Coenocystis – type locality for genus
- †Collemataria – type locality for genus
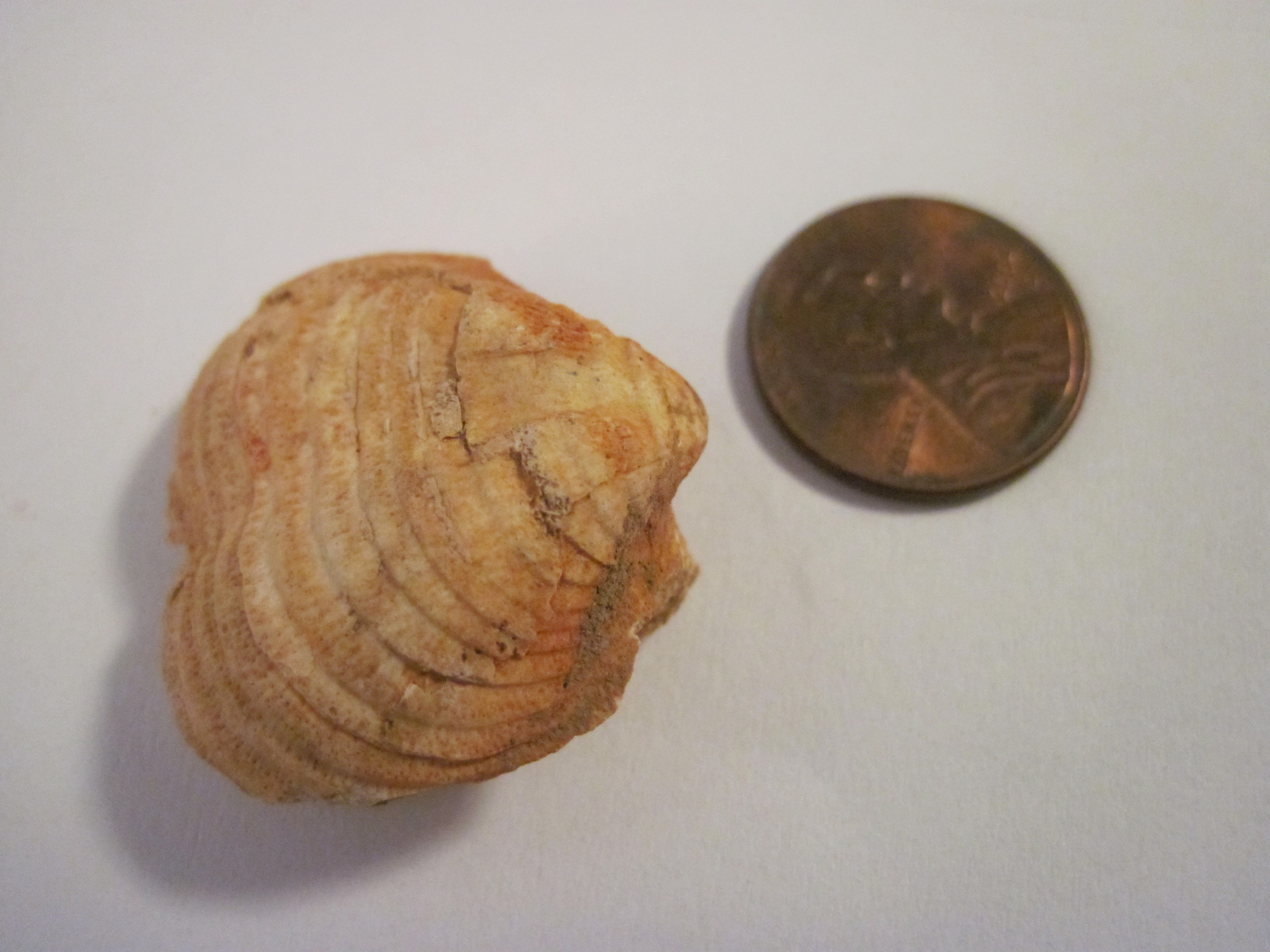
- Fossilized shell of the Late Devonian-Permian brachiopod Composita
  †Composita
  - †Composita affinis
  - †Composita apheles – type locality for species
  - †Composita apsidata
  - †Composita bucculenta – type locality for species
  - †Composita costata
  - †Composita cracens
  - †Composita crassa – type locality for species
  - †Composita discina
  - †Composita emarginata
  - †Composita enormis – type locality for species
  - †Composita imbricata – type locality for species
  - †Composita mexicana
  - †Composita mira
  - †Composita nucella
  - †Composita ovata
  - †Composita parasulcata – type locality for species
  - †Composita pilula
  - †Composita prospera
  - †Composita pyriformis
  - †Composita quantilla
  - †Composita stalagmium
  - †Composita strongyle – type locality for species
  - †Composita subcircularis
  - †Composita subtilita
- †Conjunctio
- †Conocardium – tentative report
- †Cooperoceras – type locality for genus
- †Coosella
- †Coosia
- †Cordaites
  - †Cordaites principalis
- †Cotteroceras
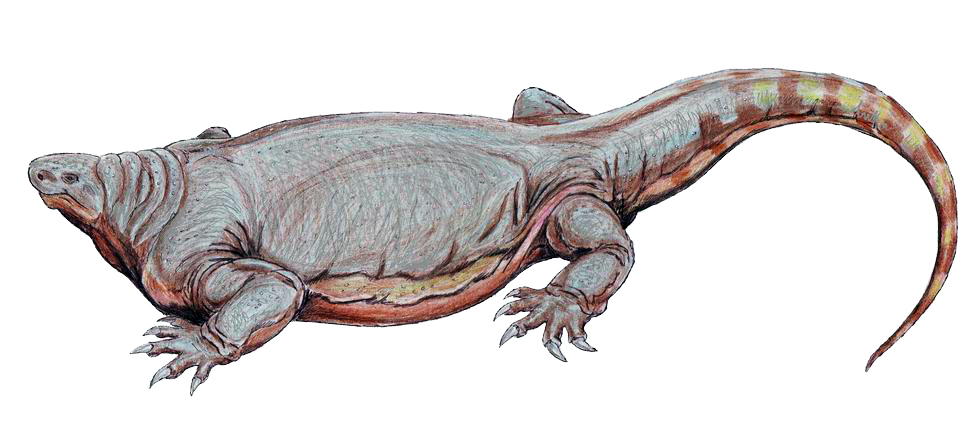
- Life restoration of the Permian synapsid (mammal precursor) Cotylorhynchus
  †Cotylorhynchus
  - †Cotylorhynchus hancocki – type locality for species
- Crania
- †Cravenoceras – tentative report
- †Cricotus
- †Crossotelos
- †Ctenacanthus
  - †Ctenacanthus amblyxiphias – type locality for species
- †Ctenospondylus – type locality for genus
- †Cylicioscapha
- †Cypricardinia – tentative report
- †Cyptendoceras
- †Cystothalamia – type locality for genus
  - †Cystothalamia megacysta
  - †Cystothalamia nodulifera
- †Dadoxylon
- †Dakeoceras – tentative report
- †Dasyceps
- †Deiracephalus
- Dentalium
- †Diadectes – type locality for genus
- †Dimacrodon – type locality for genus
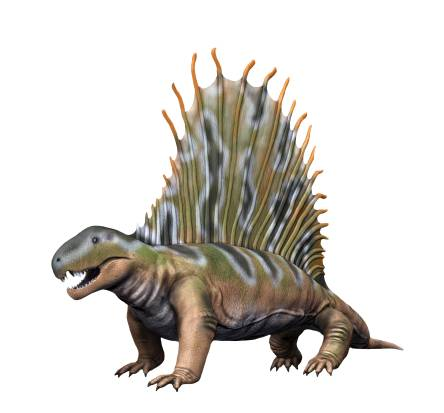
- Restoration of D. giganhomogenes with exposed neural spine tips
  †Dimetrodon – type locality for genus
  - †Dimetrodon booneorum – type locality for species
  - †Dimetrodon dollovianus – type locality for species
  - †Dimetrodon gigashomogenes – type locality for species
  - †Dimetrodon grandis – type locality for species
  - †Dimetrodon kempae – type locality for species
  - †Dimetrodon limbatus – type locality for species
  - †Dimetrodon loomisi – type locality for species
  - †Dimetrodon macrospondylus – type locality for species
  - †Dimetrodon milleri – type locality for species
  - †Dimetrodon natalis – type locality for species
- †Diplocaulus – type locality for genus
  - †Diplocaulus magnicornis – type locality for species
- †Diraphora
- †Dissorophus – type locality for genus
  - †Dissorophus multicinctus – type locality for species
- †Domatoceras
- †Driveria – type locality for genus
- †Echinaria
- †Ectenolites
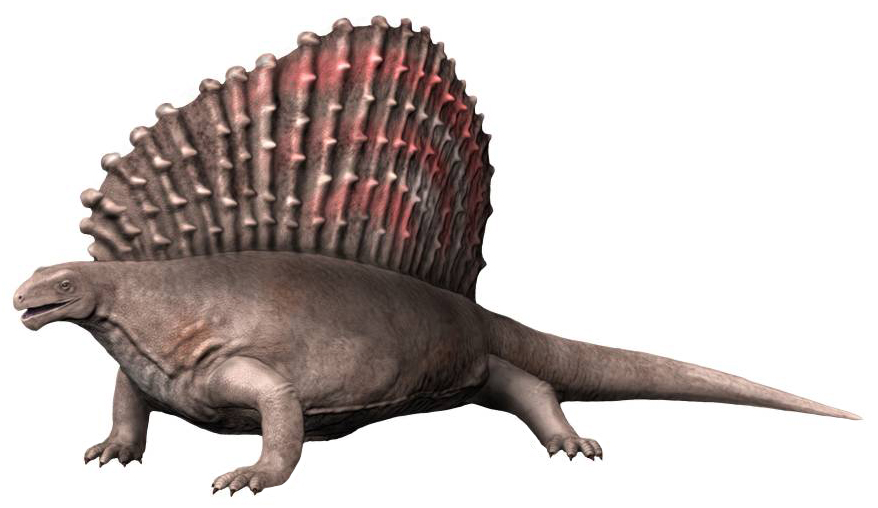
- Life restoration of the Permian synapsid (mammal precursor) Edaphosaurus
  †Edaphosaurus – type locality for genus
  - †Edaphosaurus boanerges
  - †Edaphosaurus cruciger – or unidentified related form
  - †Edaphosaurus pogonias – type locality for species
- †Edestus
- †Edmondia
- †Edops
  - †Edops craigi
- †Ellesmeroceras
- †Empedias
- †Endoceras
- †Endolobus
- Eocaudina
- †Eosyodon – type locality for genus
- †Eothyris – type locality for genus
  - †Eothyris parkeyi – type locality for species
- †Eowellerites
- †Epiphyton
- †error
- †Error
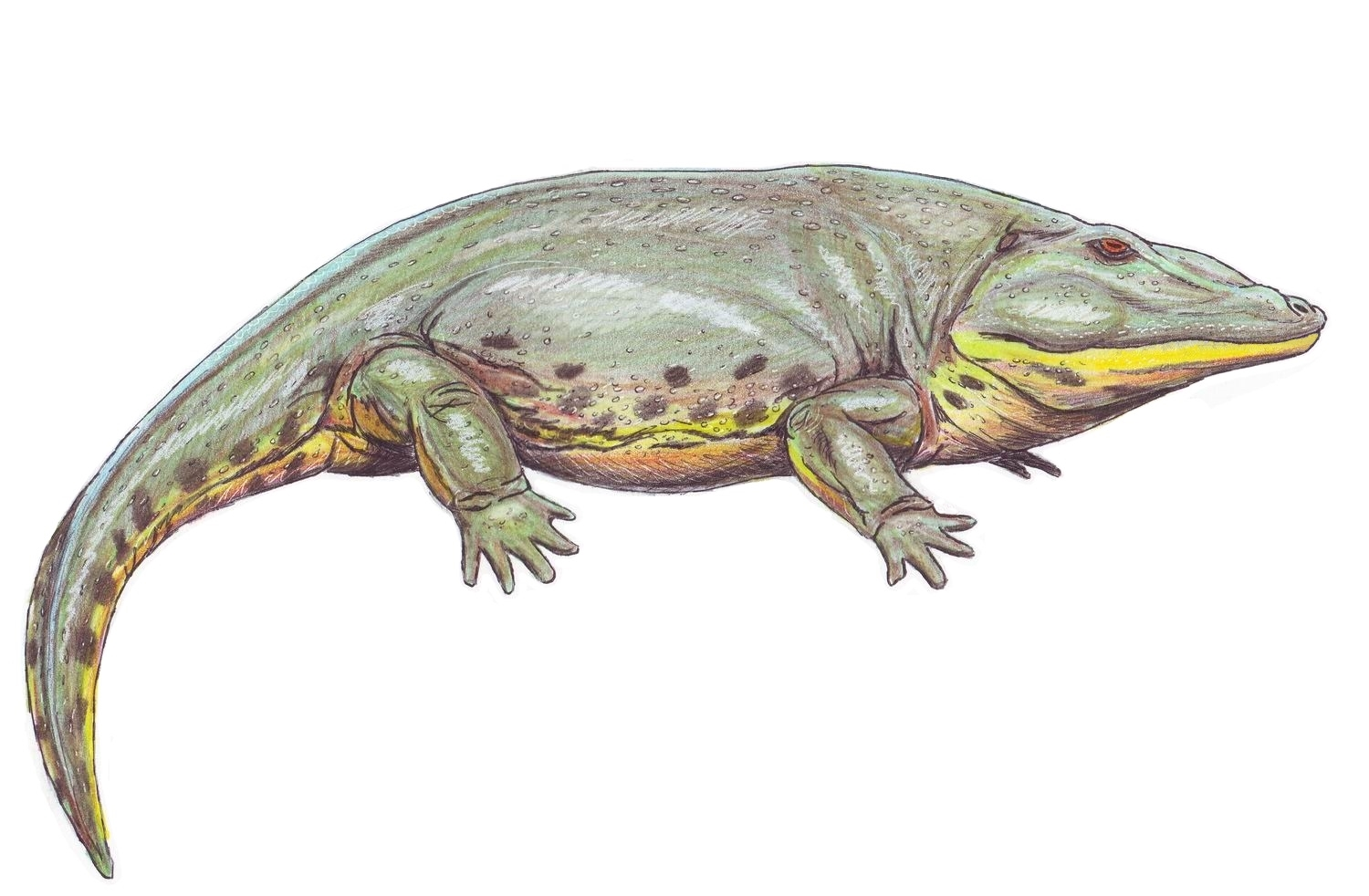
- Life restoration of the Carboniferous-Permian amphibian Eryops
  †Eryops – type locality for genus
  - †Eryops megacephalus – type locality for species
- †Estheria
- †Euomphalus
- †Euryodus – type locality for genus
  - †Euryodus primus – type locality for species
- †Exovasa – type locality for genus
  - †Exovasa cystauletoides – type locality for species
- †Fenestella
- †Fusulina – report made of unidentified related form or using admittedly obsolete nomenclature
- †Gastrioceras
- †Geinitzina
- †Genevievella
- †Geragnostus
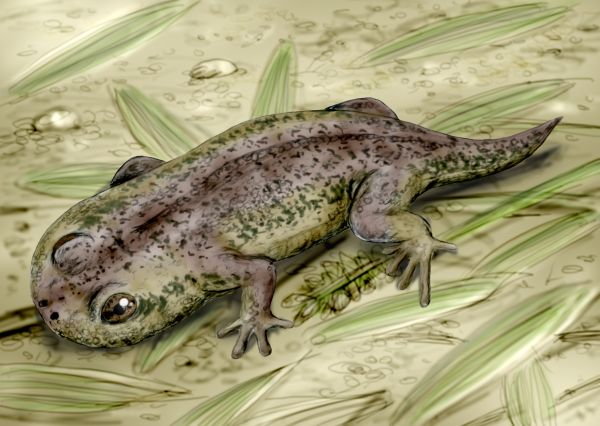
- Life restoration of the Permian frog precursor Gerobatrachus
  †Gerobatrachus – type locality for genus
  - †Gerobatrachus hottoni – type locality for species
- †Gervillia – report made of unidentified related form or using admittedly obsolete nomenclature
- †Girvanella
- †Glaucosaurus – type locality for genus
  - †Glaucosaurus megalops – type locality for species
- †Glikmanius
  - †Glikmanius occidentalis
- †Gnathorhiza
- †Goniatites
- †Gorgodon – type locality for genus
  - †Gorgodon minutus – type locality for species
- †Grewingkia
- †Guadalupia
  - †Guadalupia auricula – type locality for species
  - †Guadalupia cupulosa – type locality for species
  - †Guadalupia microcamera – type locality for species
  - †Guadalupia ramescens – type locality for species
  - †Guadalupia vasa – type locality for species
- †Gypospirifer – type locality for genus
  - †Gypospirifer condor
- †Helicoconchus – type locality for genus
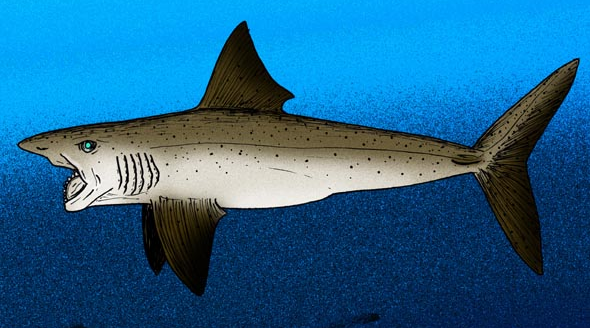
- Life restoration of the Permian Chimaera relative Helicoprion
  †Helicoprion
  - †Helicoprion davisii
- †Helminthochiton
- †Hercosestria
- †Hoffmannia – report made of unidentified related form or using admittedly obsolete nomenclature
- †Homagnostus
- †Hybodus
- †Hypseloconus
- †Icriodus
- †Incisimura – type locality for genus
  - †Incisimura bella – type locality for species
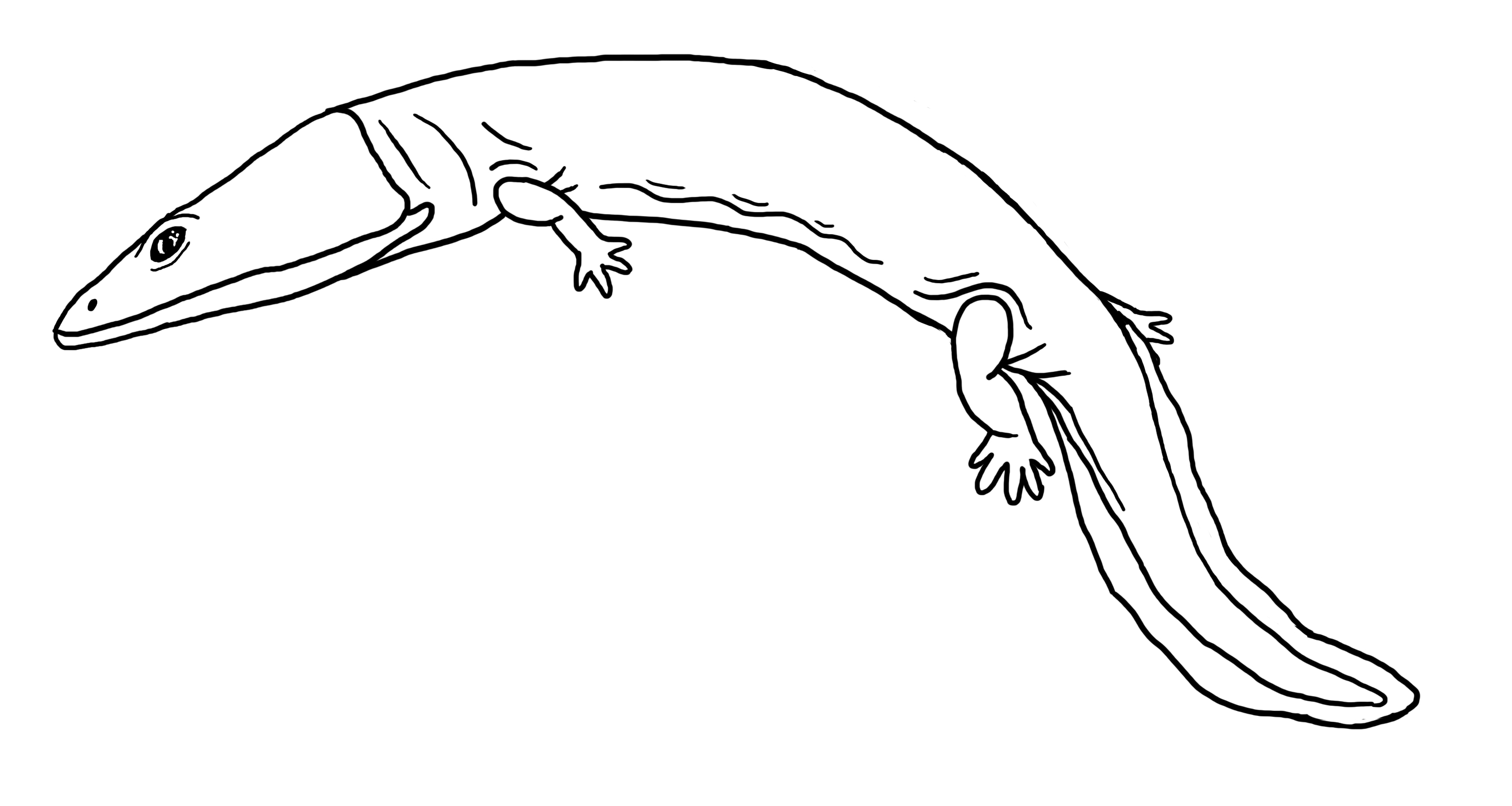
- Life restoration of the Permian amphibian Isodectes
  †Isodectes
- †Isogramma
- †Janassa
- †Jeffersonia
- †Jinogondolella
- †Kingstonia
- †Knoxosaurus – type locality for genus
- †Kockelella
- †Komia
- †Labidosaurikos
- †Labidosaurus
- †Lambeoceras
- †Lepidophyllum
- †Levisoceras
- †Limbella
- Lingula
- †Liroceras
- †Llanoaspis
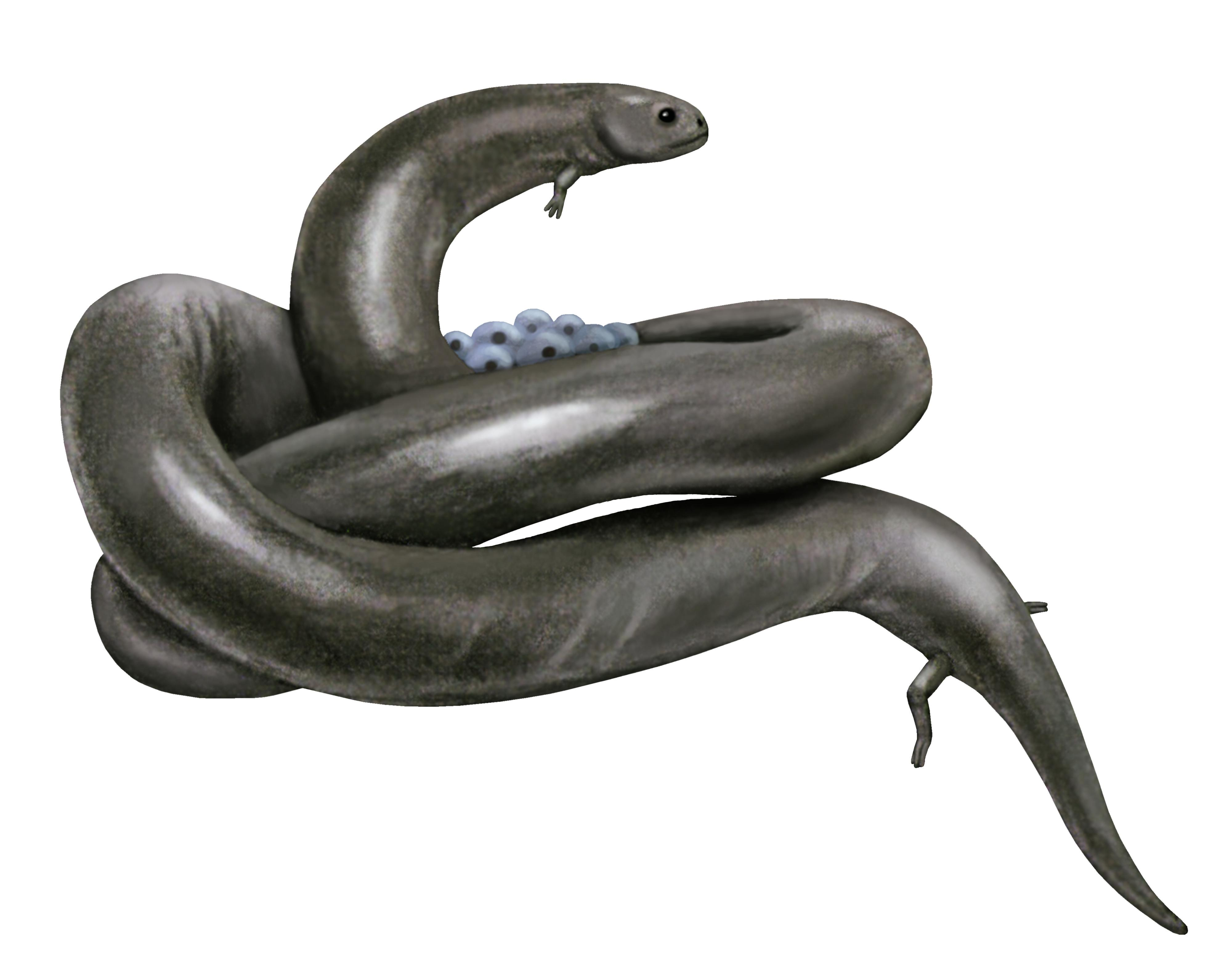
- Life restoration of the Permian snake-like amphibian Lysorophus showing speculative egg-coiling behavior
  †Lysorophus
- †Martinia
- †Mastersonia – type locality for genus
- †Mcqueenoceras
- †Metacoceras
- †Metalegoceras
- †Meteoraspis
- †Metoptoma
- †Michelinoceras – tentative report
- †Micraroter – tentative report
  - †Micraroter erythrogeios
- †Microbaltoceras – type locality for genus
- †Minilya
- †Murchisonia
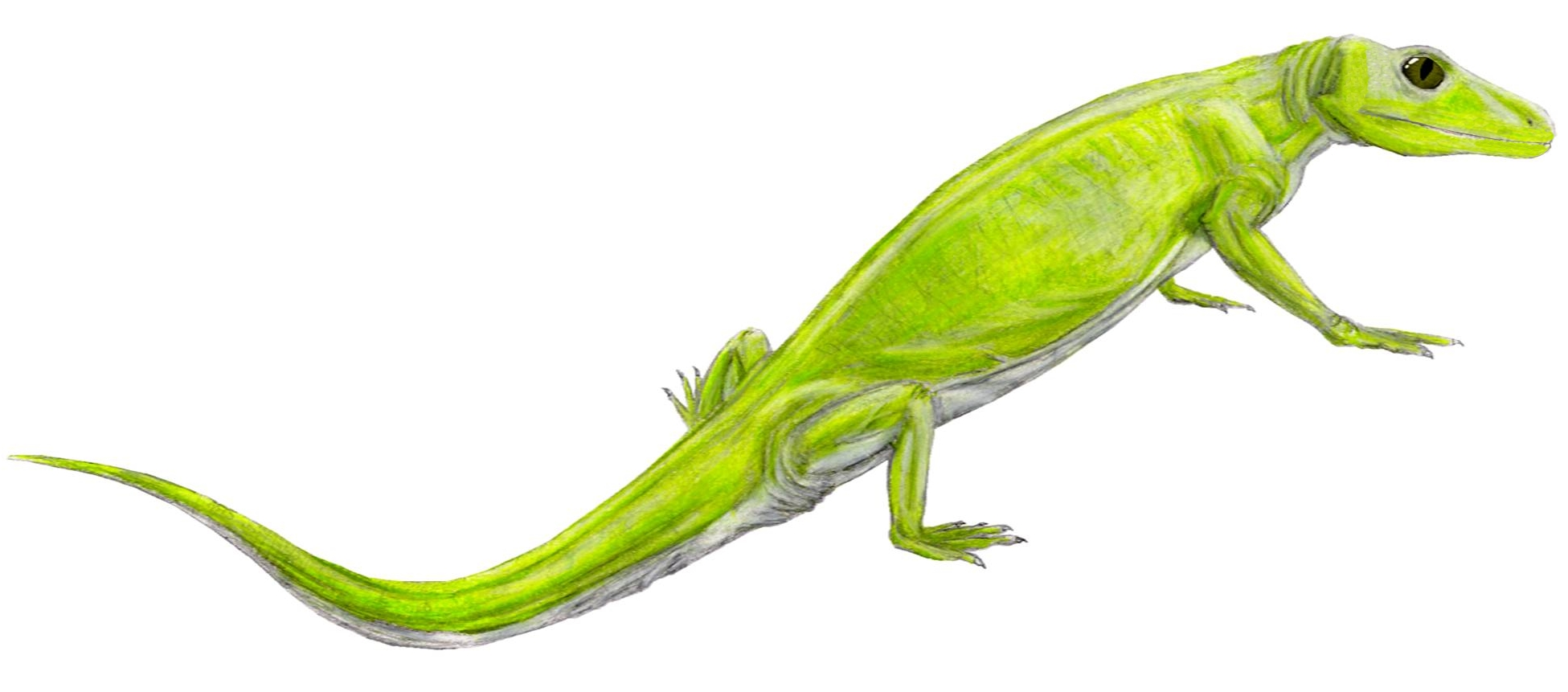
- Life restoration of the Permian synapsid (mammal precursor) Mycterosaurus
  †Mycterosaurus – type locality for genus
  - †Mycterosaurus longiceps – type locality for species
- †Nanobamus – type locality for genus
- †Naticopsis
  - †Naticopsis judithae
  - †Naticopsis remex
  - †Naticopsis transversa – type locality for species
- †Neldasaurus
- †Neoaganides
- †Neocalamites – or unidentified comparable form
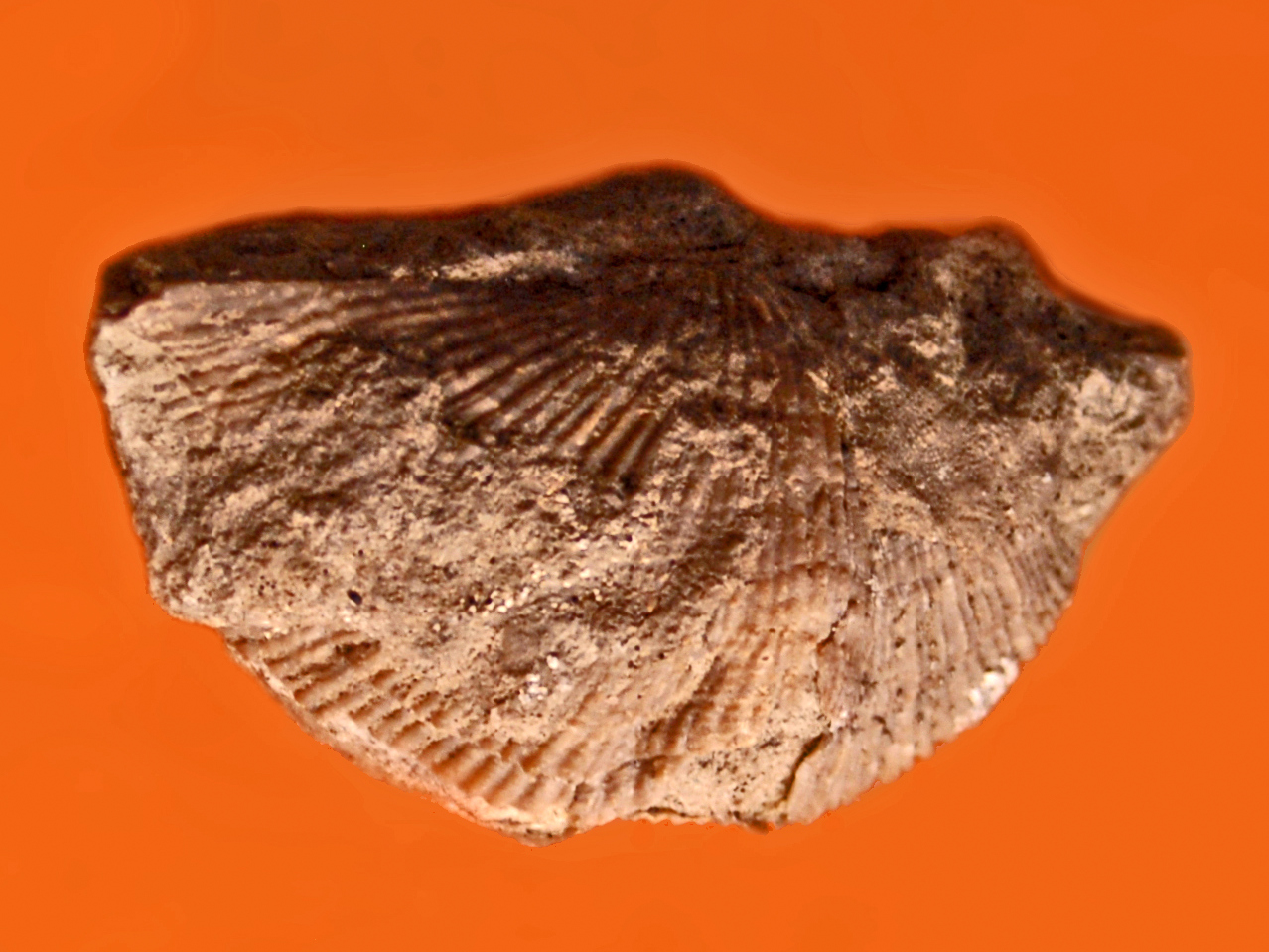
- Fossilized shell of the Carboniferous-Permian brachiopod Neospirifer
  †Neospirifer
  - †Neospirifer amphigyus – type locality for species
  - †Neospirifer apothescelus – type locality for species
  - †Neospirifer bakeri – type locality for species
  - †Neospirifer cameratus – tentative report
  - †Neospirifer formulosus
  - †Neospirifer huecoensis – type locality for species
  - †Neospirifer kansasensis
  - †Neospirifer mansuetus
  - †Neospirifer neali
  - †Neospirifer notialis
  - †Neospirifer placidus
  - †Neospirifer triplicatus
  - †Neospirifer venezuelensis
- †Neuropteris
  - †Neuropteris cordata – tentative report
- †Nielsenoceras
- †Norwoodia
- Nucula – report made of unidentified related form or using admittedly obsolete nomenclature
- †Nybyoceras
- †Olenus
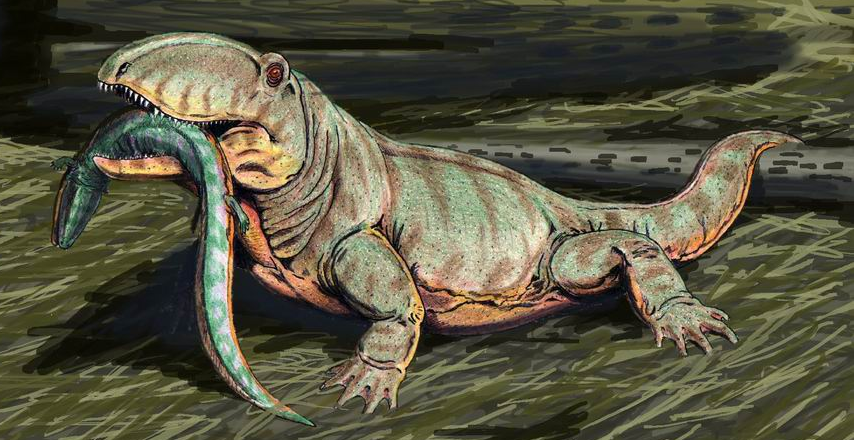
- Life restoration of the Carboniferous-Permian synapsid (mammal precursor) Ophiacodon
  †Ophiacodon – type locality for genus
  - †Ophiacodon major – type locality for species
  - †Ophiacodon retroversus – type locality for species
  - †Ophiacodon uniformis – type locality for species
- †Ormoceras
- †Orodus
- †Orthacanthus
- †Ostodolepis – type locality for genus
- †Oulodus
- †Ozarkodina
- †Pachylyroceras
- †Paladin
- †Palaeoniscus – tentative report
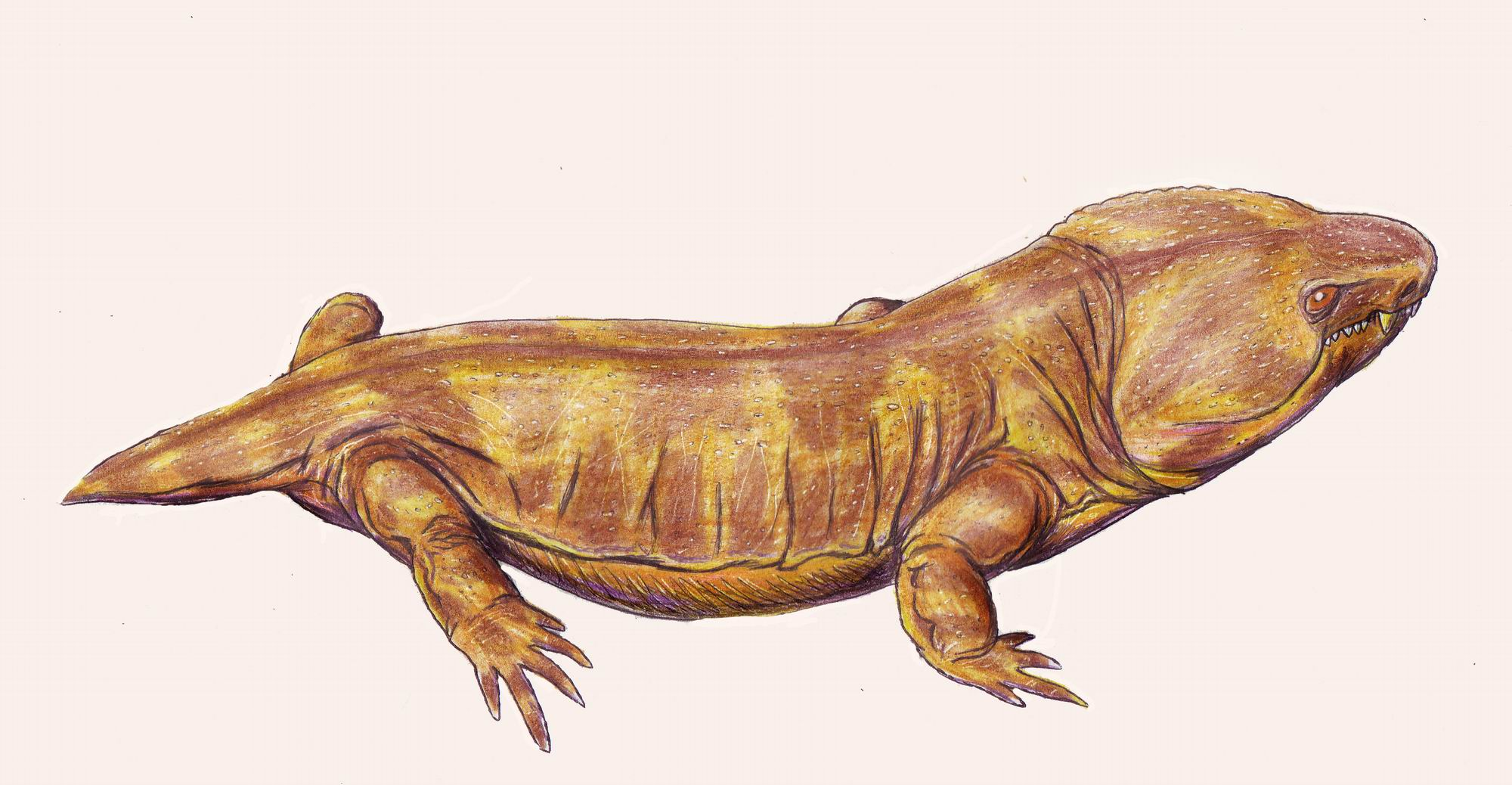
- Pantylus
  †Pantylus – type locality for genus
  - †Pantylus cordatus – type locality for species
- †Paraceltites
- †Parafusulina
- †Paralegoceras
- †Paraschwagerina
- †Pariotichus – type locality for genus
- †Parioxys – type locality for genus
- Patella – tentative report
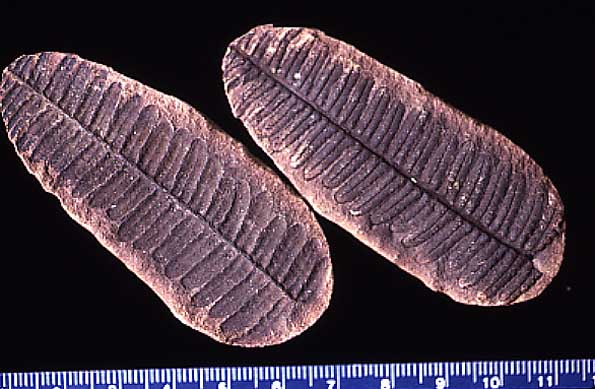
- Fossils of the Late Devonian-Permian fern-like fronds Pecopteris
  †Pecopteris
  - †Pecopteris arborescens
  - †Pecopteris hemitelioides
  - †Pecopteris unita
- †Pedanochiton – type locality for genus
- †Pelodosotis – type locality for genus
  - †Pelodosotis elongatum – type locality for species
- †Peripetoceras
- †Petalodus
- †Phlegethontia – tentative report
- †Phonerpeton
  - †Phonerpeton pricei – type locality for species
- †Pinnularia
- †Plaesiomys
- †Plagiostoma – report made of unidentified related form or using admittedly obsolete nomenclature
- †Platyceras
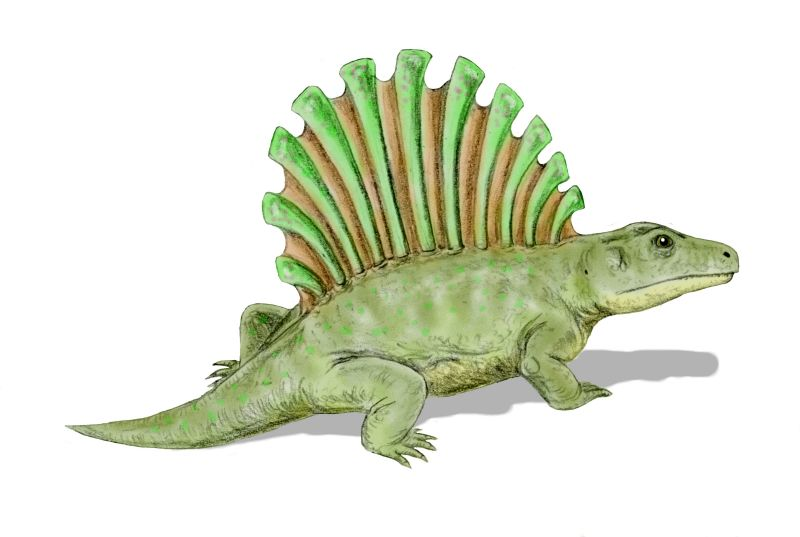
- Life restoration of the Carboniferous-Permian sail-backed amphibian Platyhystrix
  †Platyhystrix – or unidentified comparable form
- †Plectronoceras
- †Pleuronautilus
- Pleurotomaria – report made of unidentified related form or using admittedly obsolete nomenclature
- †Plicochonetes
- †Posidonia
- Priscopedatus
- †Prodentalium
- †Prostacheoceras
  - †Prostacheoceras skinneri – type locality for species
- †Protocaptorhinus – type locality for genus
  - †Protocaptorhinus pricei – type locality for species
- †Protorothyris – type locality for genus
  - †Protorothyris archeri – type locality for species
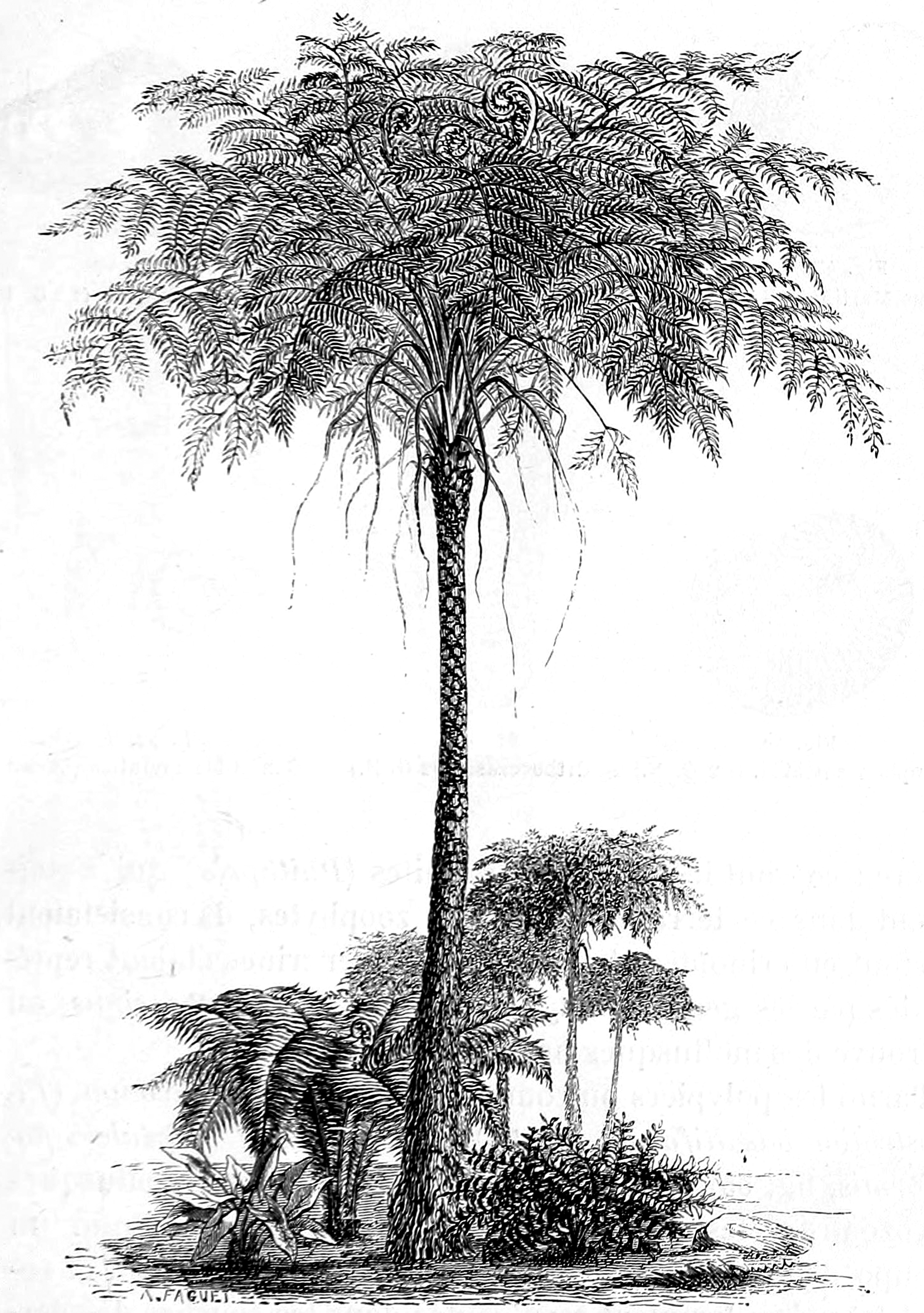
- Life restoration of the Devonian-Permian tree fern Psaronius. Auguste Faguet (1877).
  †Psaronius
- †Pseudomelania – report made of unidentified related form or using admittedly obsolete nomenclature
- Pteria – report made of unidentified related form or using admittedly obsolete nomenclature
- †Pterochiton
- †Pugnax
- †Quadratia
- †Quasicaecilia – type locality for genus
- †Rananasus
- †Rayonnoceras
- †Reiszorhinus – type locality for genus
- †Retaria – report made of unidentified related form or using admittedly obsolete nomenclature
- †Rhabdiferoceras
- †Rhynchonella – report made of unidentified related form or using admittedly obsolete nomenclature
- †Ribeiria
- †Rioceras
- †Romeria – type locality for genus
  - †Romeria prima – type locality for species
  - †Romeria texana – type locality for species
- †Rota
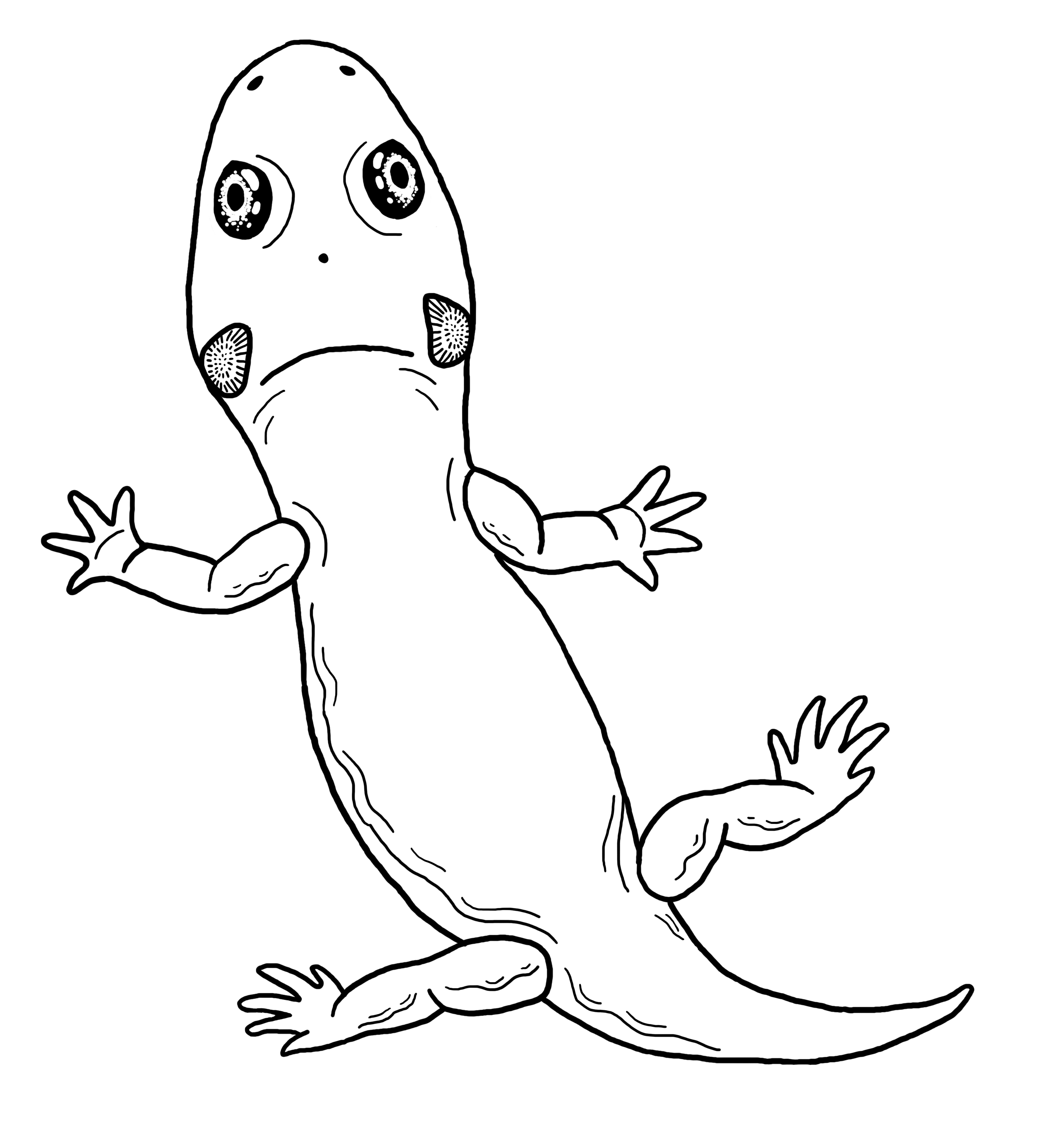
- Life restoration of the Permian amphibian Rubeostratilia
  †Rubeostratilia – type locality for genus
- †Rugaria
- †Ruthenoceras – report made of unidentified related form or using admittedly obsolete nomenclature
- †Sagenodus
- †Sallya
- †Samaropsis
- †Sauropleura
- †Scapanops – type locality for genus
  - †Scapanops neglecta – type locality for species
- †Schwagerina
- †Secodontosaurus
  - †Secodontosaurus obtusidens – type locality for species
- Serpula – tentative report
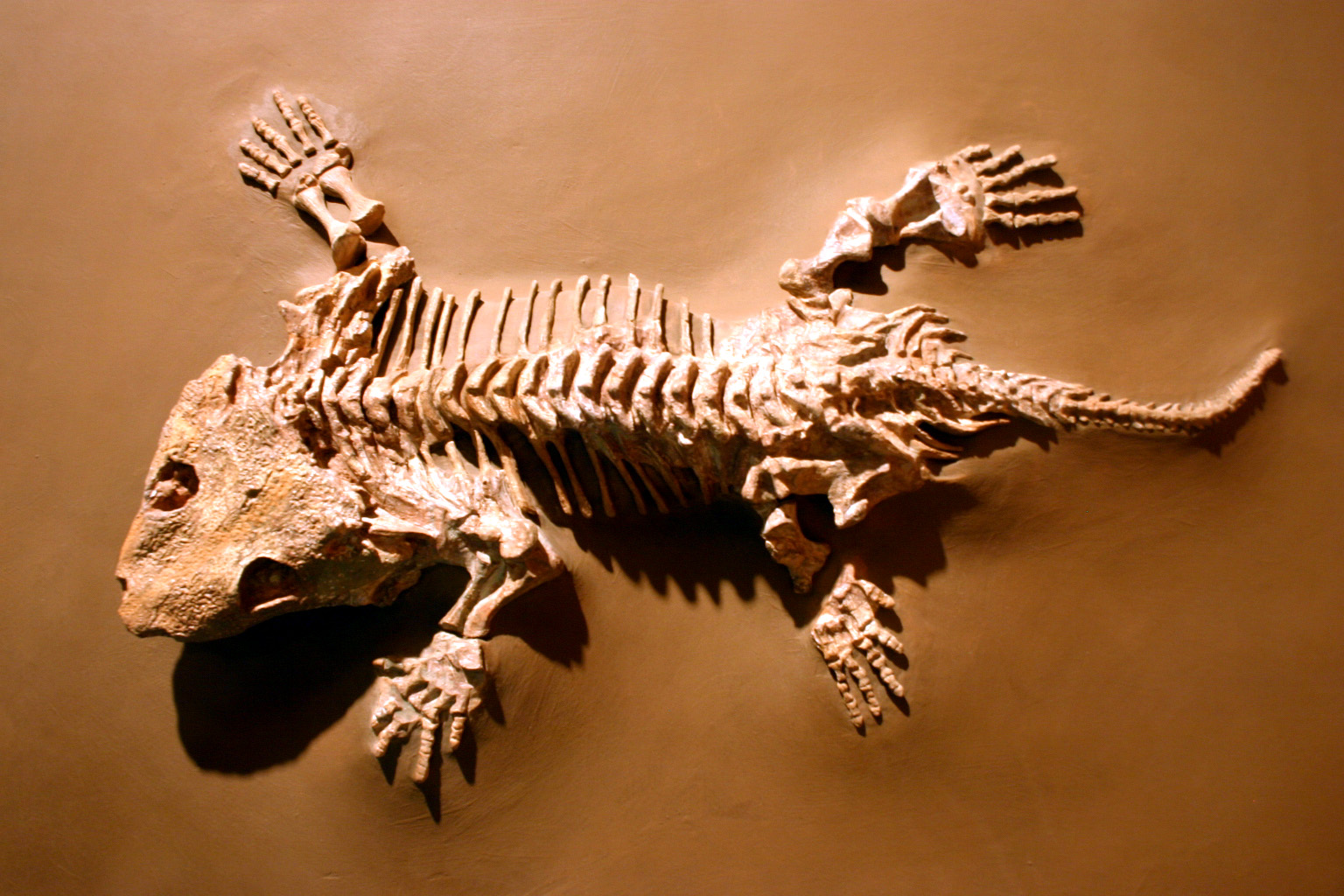
- Fossilized skeleton of the Permian primitive four-limbed animal Seymouria
  †Seymouria – type locality for genus
  - †Seymouria baylorensis – type locality for species
- †Shouchangoceras
- †Sigillaria
  - †Sigillaria brardii
- †Slaugenhopia – type locality for genus
- Solemya – tentative report
- †Solenochilus
- †Solenopora
- †Spermatodus
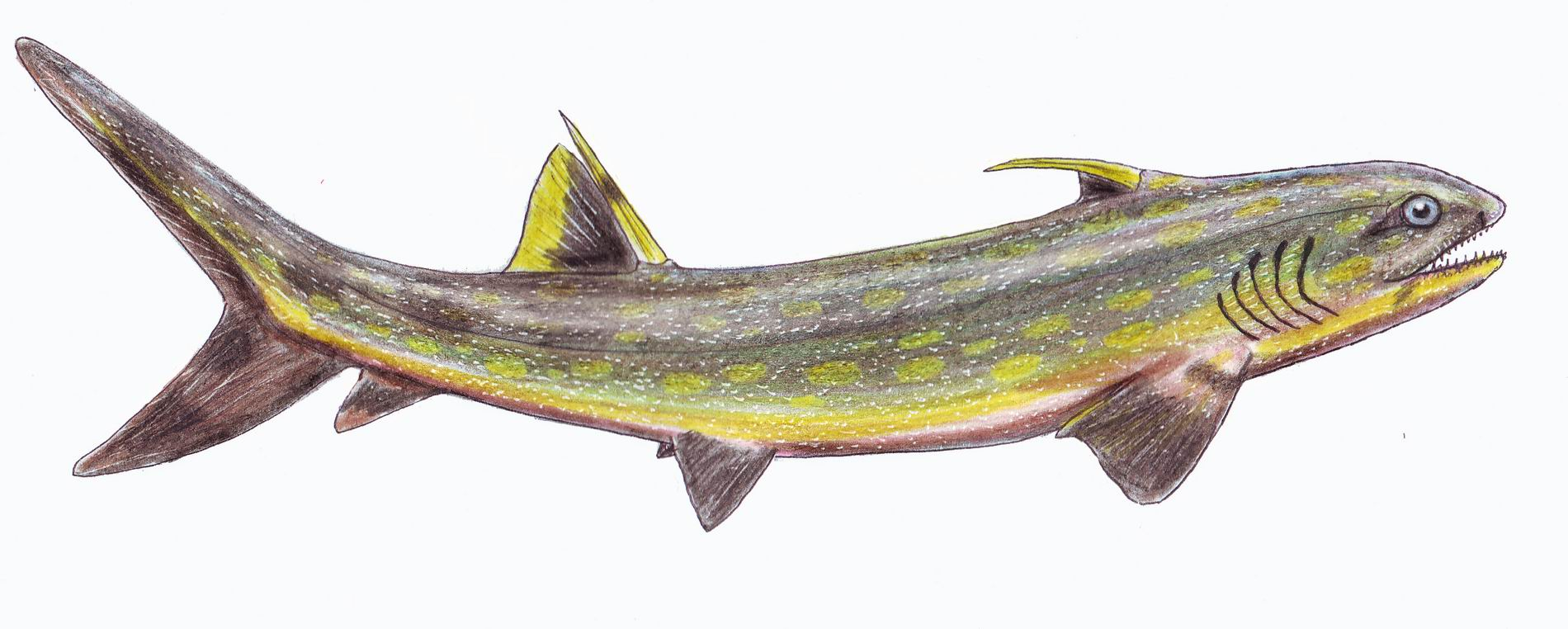
- Life restoration of the Late Devonian-Permian Sphenacanthus
  †Sphenacanthus
- †Sphenophyllum
  - †Sphenophyllum oblongifolium
- †Sphenopteris
- †Spica
- †Spirifer
  - †Spirifer rockymontanus
- Spirorbis
- †Stearoceras
- †Steppesaurus – type locality for genus
- †Stereophallodon – type locality for genus
  - †Stereophallodon ciscoensis – type locality for species
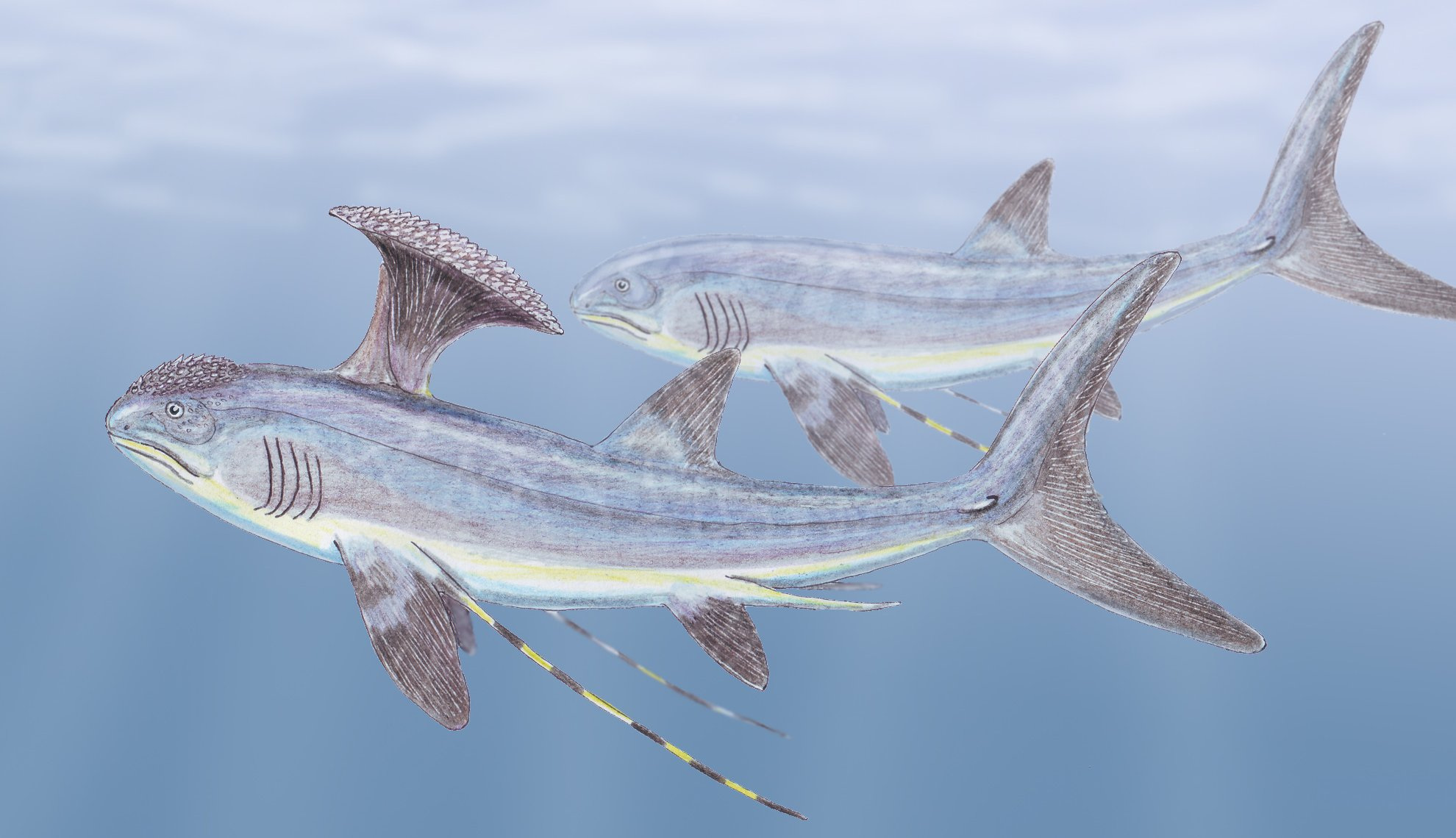
- Life restorations of a male (foreground) and female (background) of the Late Devonian-Carboniferous Chimaera relative Stethacanthus
  †Stethacanthus
- †Strepsodiscus
- †Strophomena
  - †Strophomena neglecta
- †Syringopora – tentative report
- †Tainoceras
- †Tappenosaurus – type locality for genus
  - †Tappenosaurus magnus – type locality for species
- †Tarphyceras
- †Terebratula – report made of unidentified related form or using admittedly obsolete nomenclature
- †Tersomius – type locality for genus
  - †Tersomius texensis – type locality for species
- †Tesnusocaris – type locality for genus
  - †Tesnusocaris goldichi – type locality for species
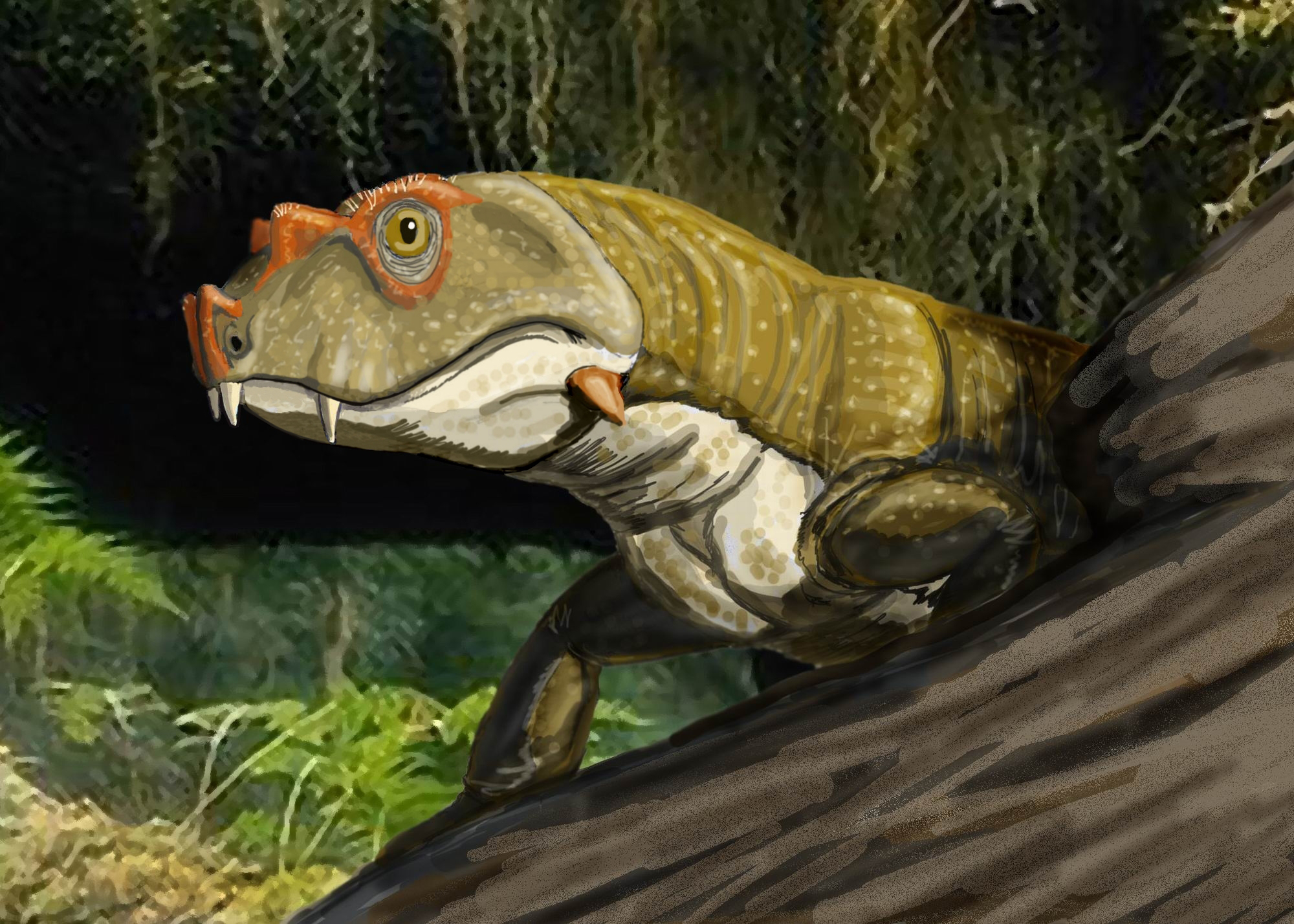
- Restorative portrait of the Permian synapsid (mammal precursor) Tetraceratops
  †Tetraceratops – type locality for genus
  - †Tetraceratops insignis – type locality for species
- †Tetrataxis
- †Texoceras
- †Trichasaurus – type locality for genus
  - †Trichasaurus texensis – type locality for species
- †Tricrepicephalus
- †Trimerorhachis
  - †Trimerorhachis greggi – type locality for species
  - †Trimerorhachis insignis – type locality for species
- †Triproetus
- Trochus – report made of unidentified related form or using admittedly obsolete nomenclature
- †Tunstallia – report made of unidentified related form or using admittedly obsolete nomenclature
- Turbo – report made of unidentified related form or using admittedly obsolete nomenclature
- †Varanops
  - †Varanops brevirostris – type locality for species
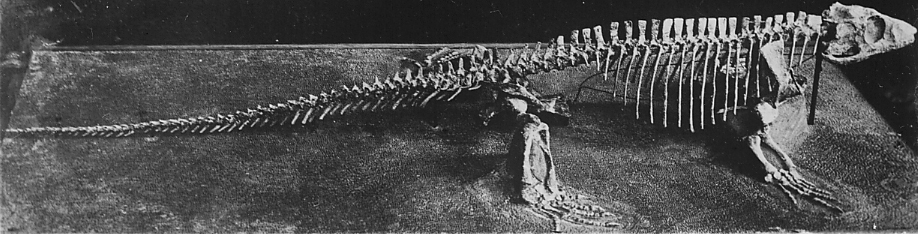
- Mounted fossilized skeleton of the Permian synapsid (mammal precursor) Varanosaurus
  †Varanosaurus – type locality for genus
  - †Varanosaurus acutirostris – type locality for species
- †Vidria
- †Waagenina
- †Waagenoceras
- †Waggoneria – type locality for genus
- †Walchia
- †Wattia – type locality for genus
- †Wilkingia
- †Worthenia
- †Wurmiella
  - †Wurmiella excavata
- †Xenacanthus
- †Xyloiulus – tentative report
- Yoldia – tentative report
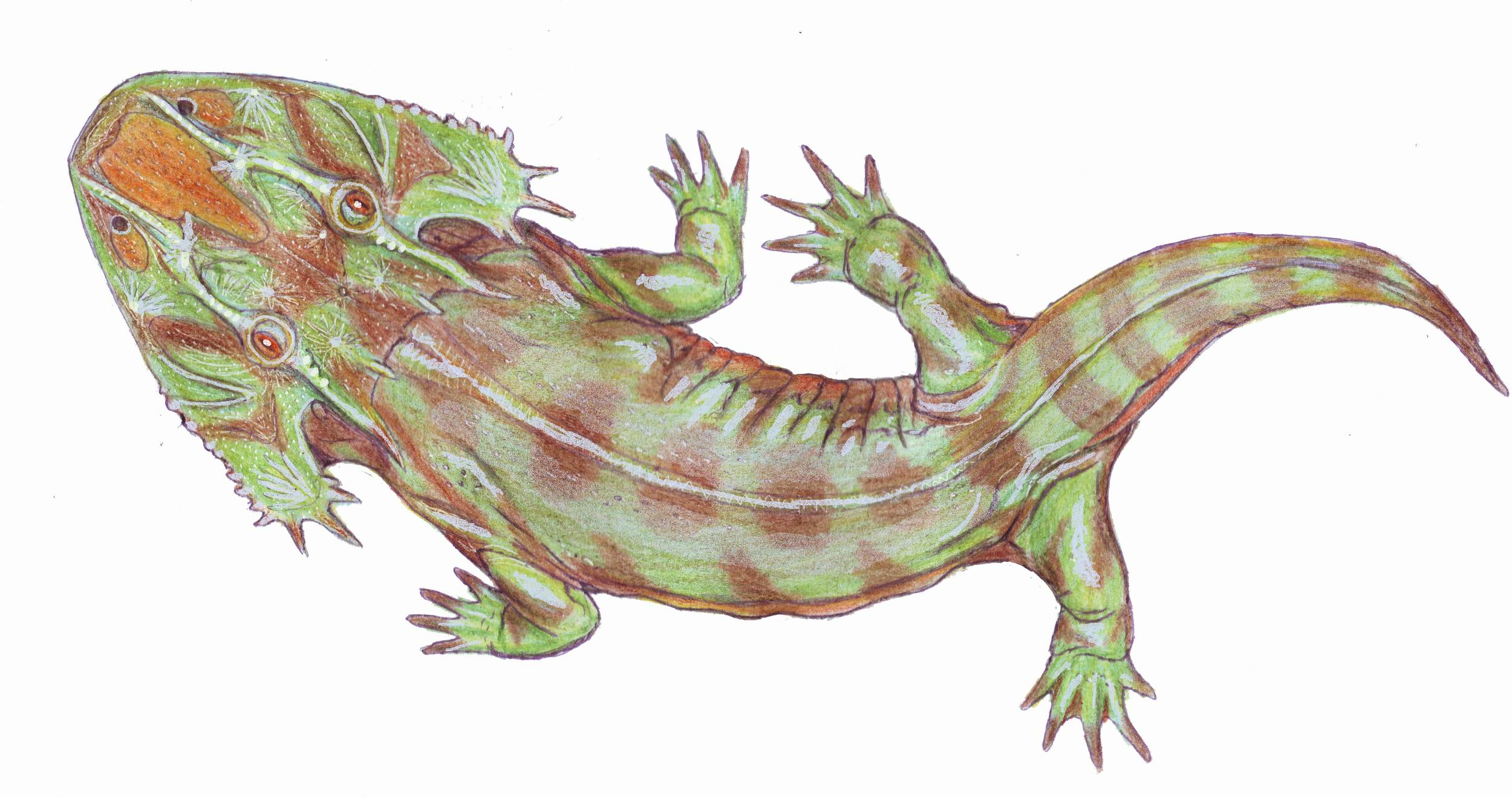
- Life restoration of the Permian amphibian Zatrachys
  †Zatrachys

== Mesozoic ==
=== Selected Mesozoic taxa of Texas ===
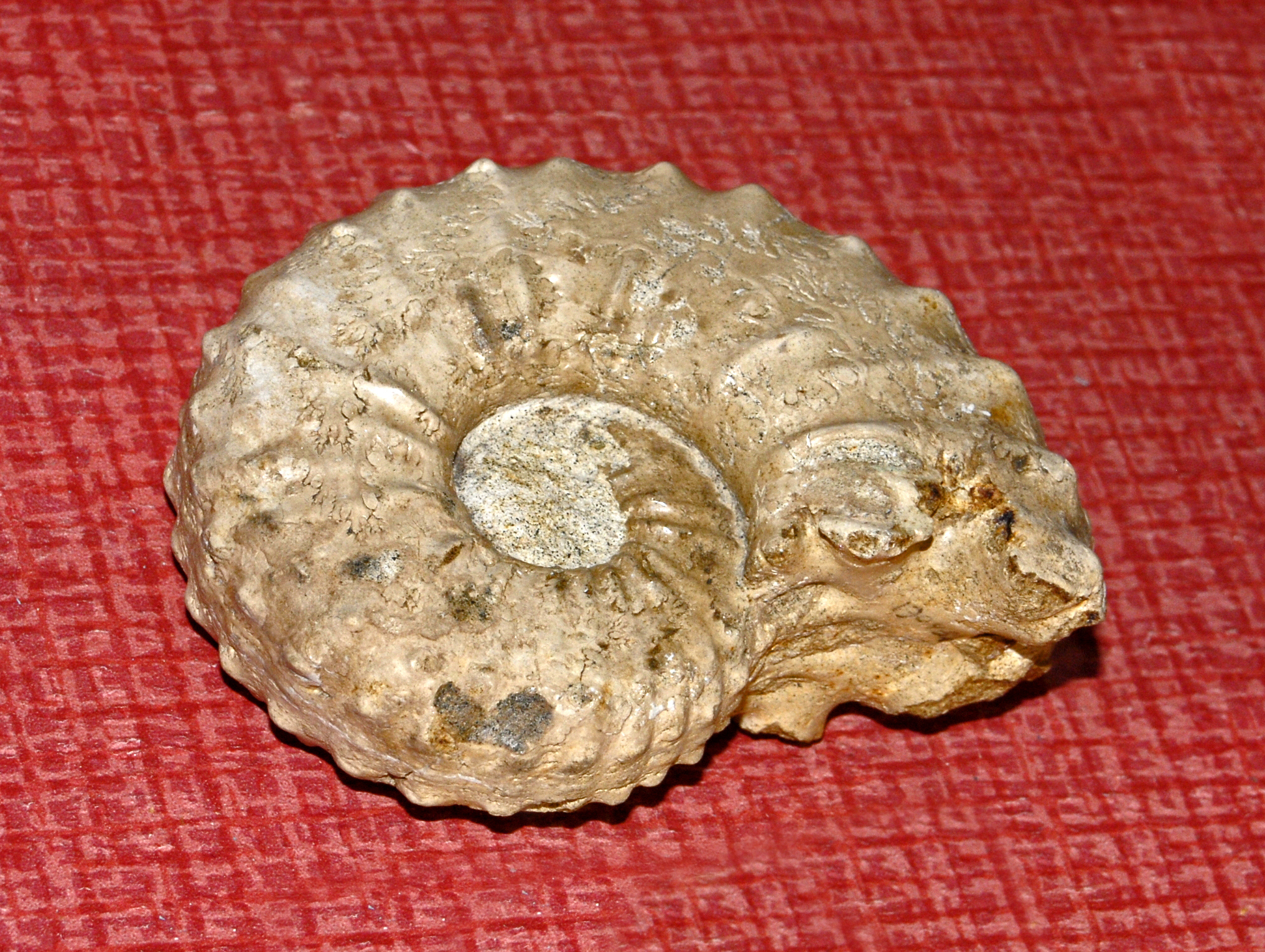
- Fossilized shell of the Early-Late Cretaceous ammonoid cephalopod Acanthoceras
  †Acanthoceras
  - †Acanthoceras adkinsi
  - †Acanthoceras amphibolum
  - †Acanthoceras barcusi
  - †Acanthoceras eulessanum
  - †Acanthoceras johnsonanum
  - †Acanthoceras tarrantense
  - †Acanthoceras wintoni
  - †Acanthoceras worthense
- Acesta
- Acirsa
- Acmaea
- †Acompsoceras
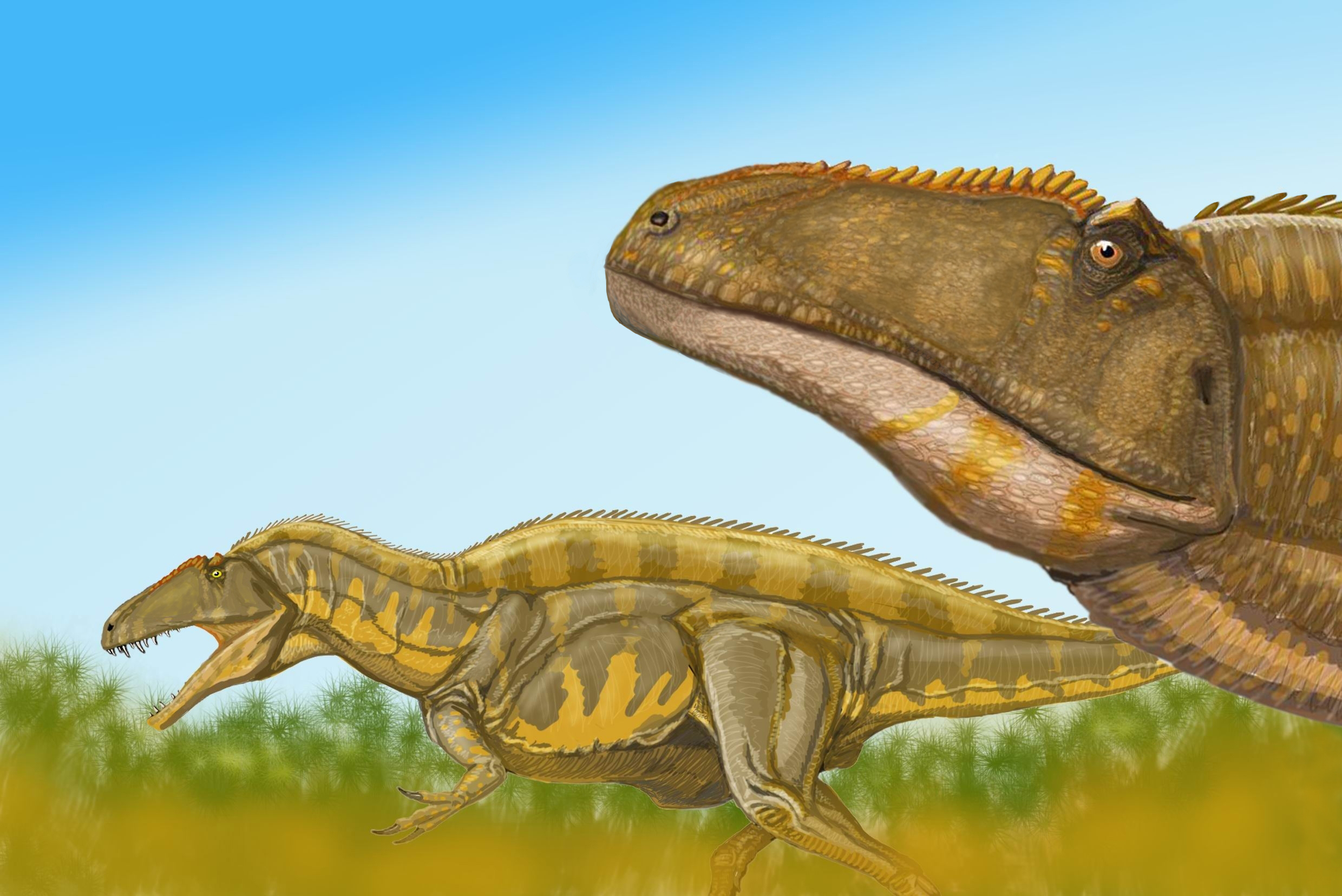
- Life restoration of the Early Cretaceous theropod dinosaur Acrocanthosaurus
  †Acrocanthosaurus
  - †Acrocanthosaurus atokensis
- Acteon
- †Acteonella
- †Adelobasileus – type locality for genus
  - †Adelobasileus cromptoni – type locality for species
- †Adkinsia
- †Adocus
- †Aenona
- †Aetodactylus – type locality for genus
  - †Aetodactylus halli – type locality for species
- †Agerostrea
- †Agujaceratops
  - †Agujaceratops mariscalensis – type locality for species
- †Akera
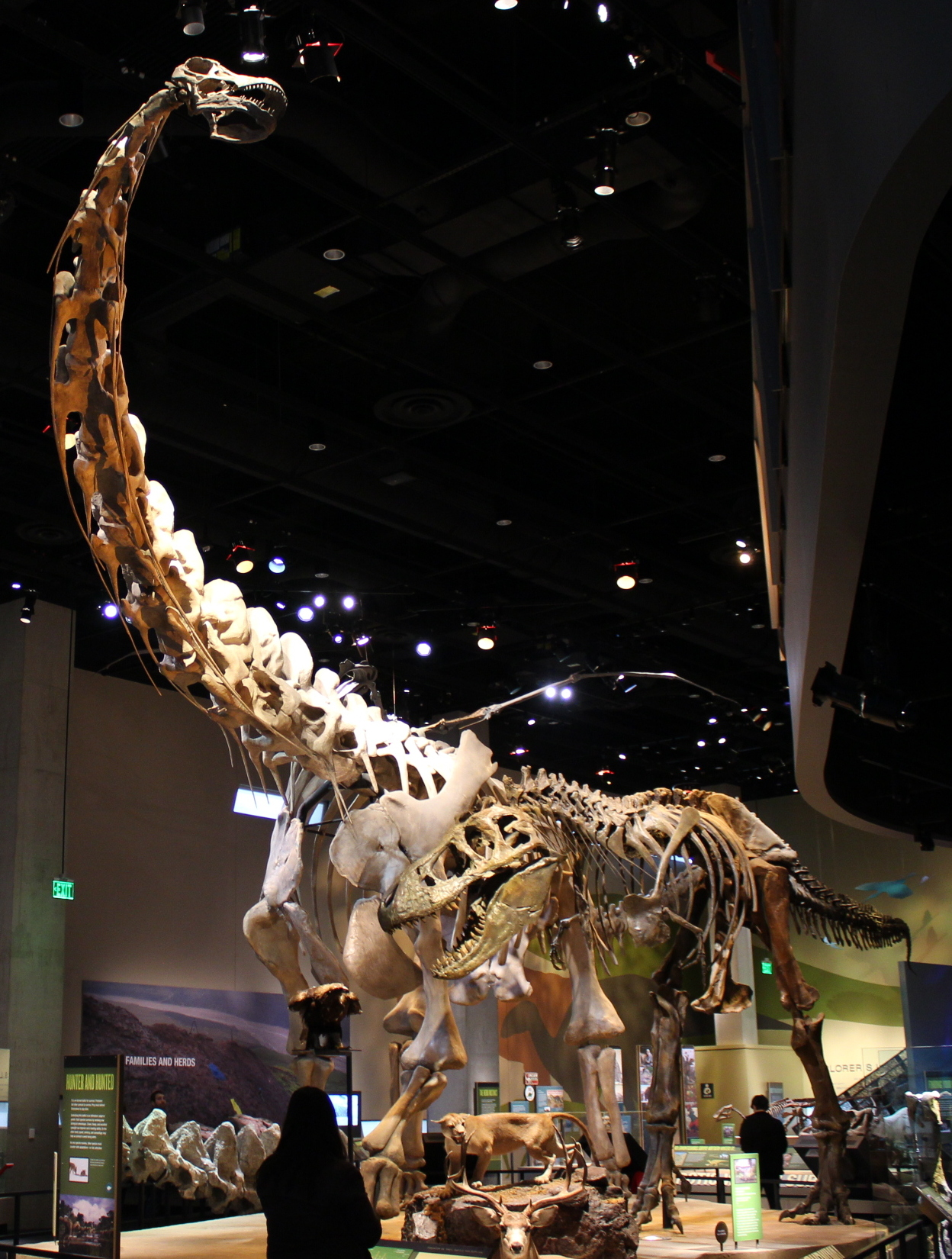
- Alamosaurus
  †Alamosaurus
  - †Alamosaurus sanjuanensis
- †Albanerpeton
  - †Albanerpeton gracilis
  - †Albanerpeton nexuosus
- †Allocrioceras
- Alnus
- †Alphadon
  - †Alphadon halleyi – or unidentified comparable form
- †Ampullina – or unidentified comparable form
- Amusium
- †Anaklinoceras
- †Ancilla
- †Angistorhinus
  - †Angistorhinus grandis
- †Angulomastacator – type locality for genus
  - †Angulomastacator daviesi – type locality for species
- †Anisoceras
- Anomia
- †Anomoeodus
- †Anomotodon
- †Apachesaurus
  - †Apachesaurus gregorii
- Arca
- Architectonica
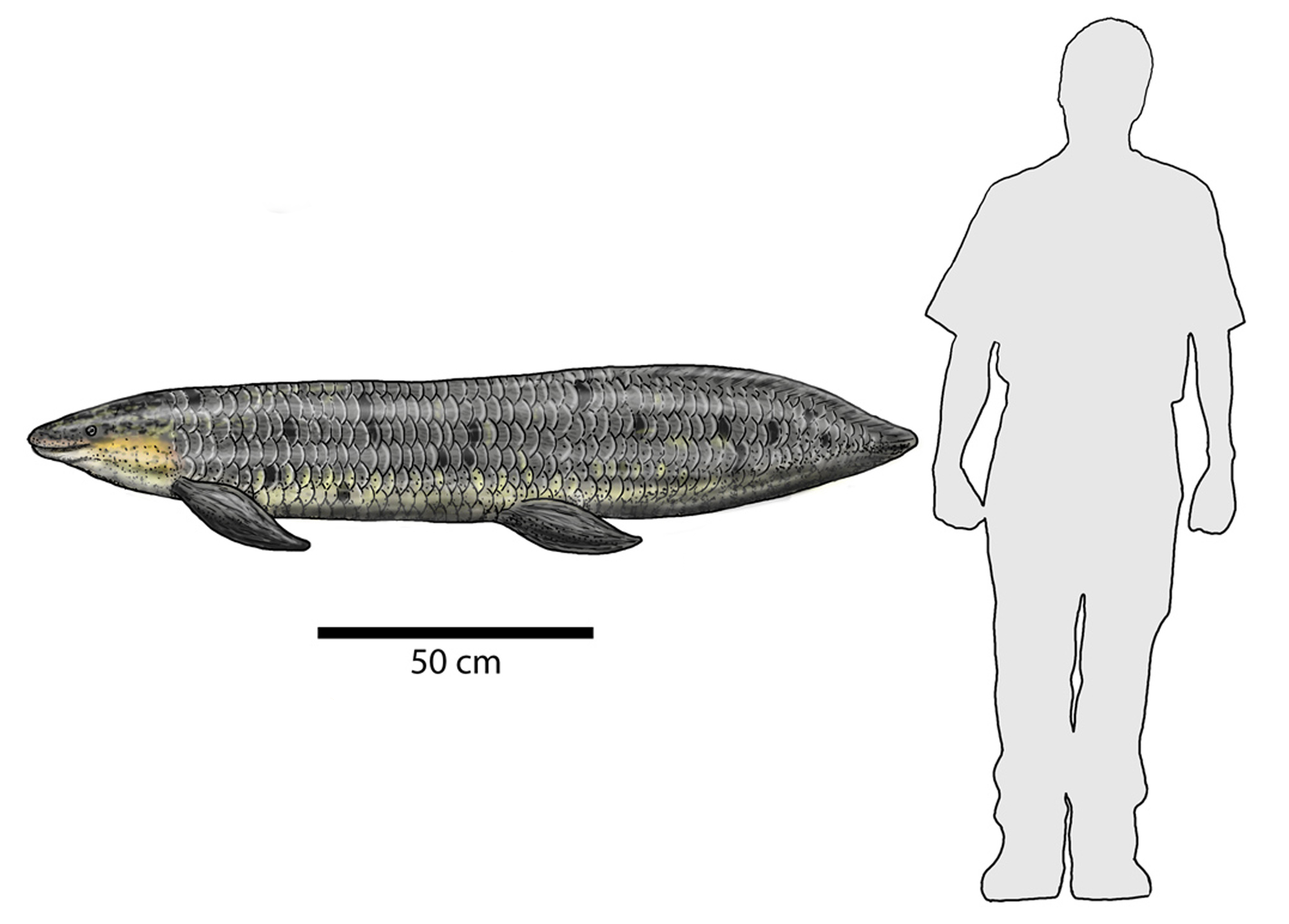
- Restoration of the Late Triassic lungfish Arganodus with an anachronistic human to scale
  †Arganodus
  - †Arganodus dorotheae – type locality for species
- Arrhoges
- †Aspidoceras
- Astarte
- Astrangia
- Astreopora – tentative report
- †Astroconodon – type locality for genus
  - †Astroconodon denisoni – type locality for species
- †Astrodon
  - †Astrodon johnstoni
- †Astrophocaudia – type locality for genus
  - †Astrophocaudia slaughteri – type locality for species
- †Axonoceras
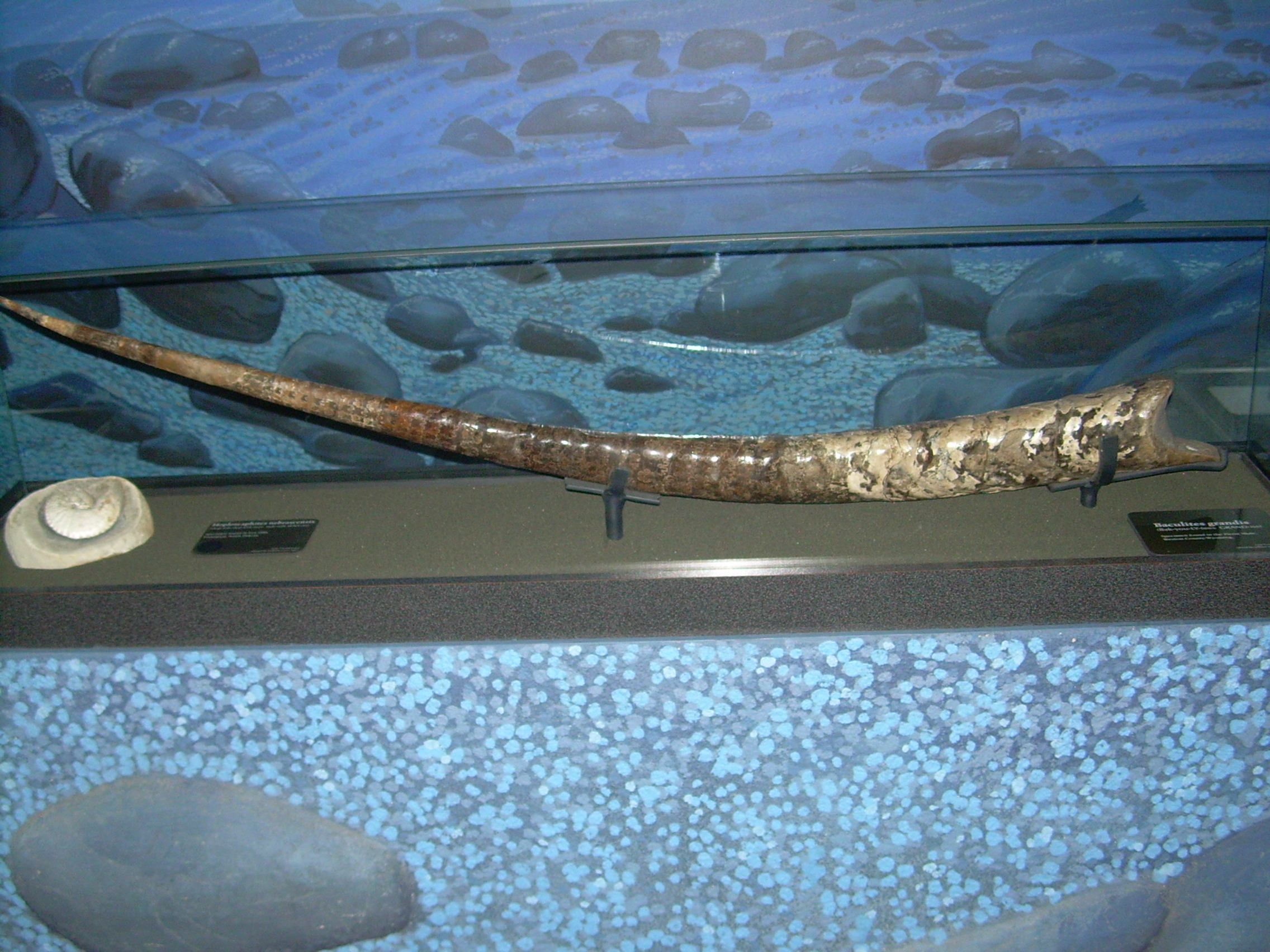
- Fossilized shell of the Late Cretaceous ammonoid cephalopod Baculites
  †Baculites
  - †Baculites aquilaensis - or unidentified loosely related form
  - †Baculites haresi – or unidentified comparable form
  - †Baculites ovatus
  - †Baculites scotti
  - †Baculites tippahensis
- †Baena – report made of unidentified related form or using admittedly obsolete nomenclature
- †Banis
- Barbatia – tentative report
- †Barroisiceras
- †Basilemys
- †Belemnitella
  - †Belemnitella americana
- †Belodon
- †Belonostomus
- †Bernissartia – tentative report
- †Betelgeusia – type locality for genus
  - †Betelgeusia reidi – type locality for species
- †Bostrychoceras
- Botula
  - †Botula carolinensis
  - †Botula conchafodentis
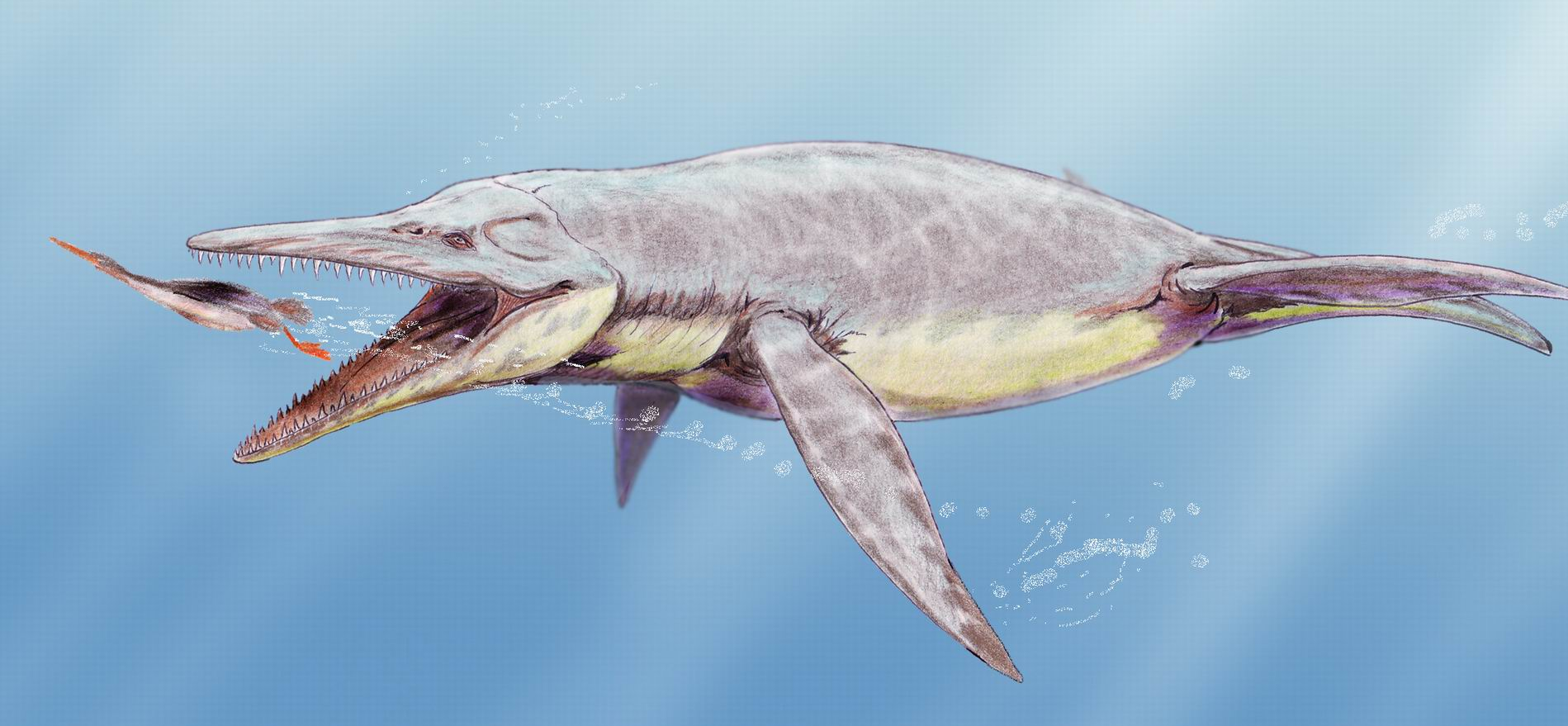
- Life restoration of the Late Cretaceous plesiosaur Brachauchenius hunting a hesperornithiform bird
  †Brachauchenius
  - †Brachauchenius lucasi
- Brachidontes
- †Brachychampsa
- †Brachysuchus – type locality for genus
  - †Brachysuchus megalodon – type locality for species
- †Bravoceratops – type locality for genus
  - †Bravoceratops polyphemus – type locality for species
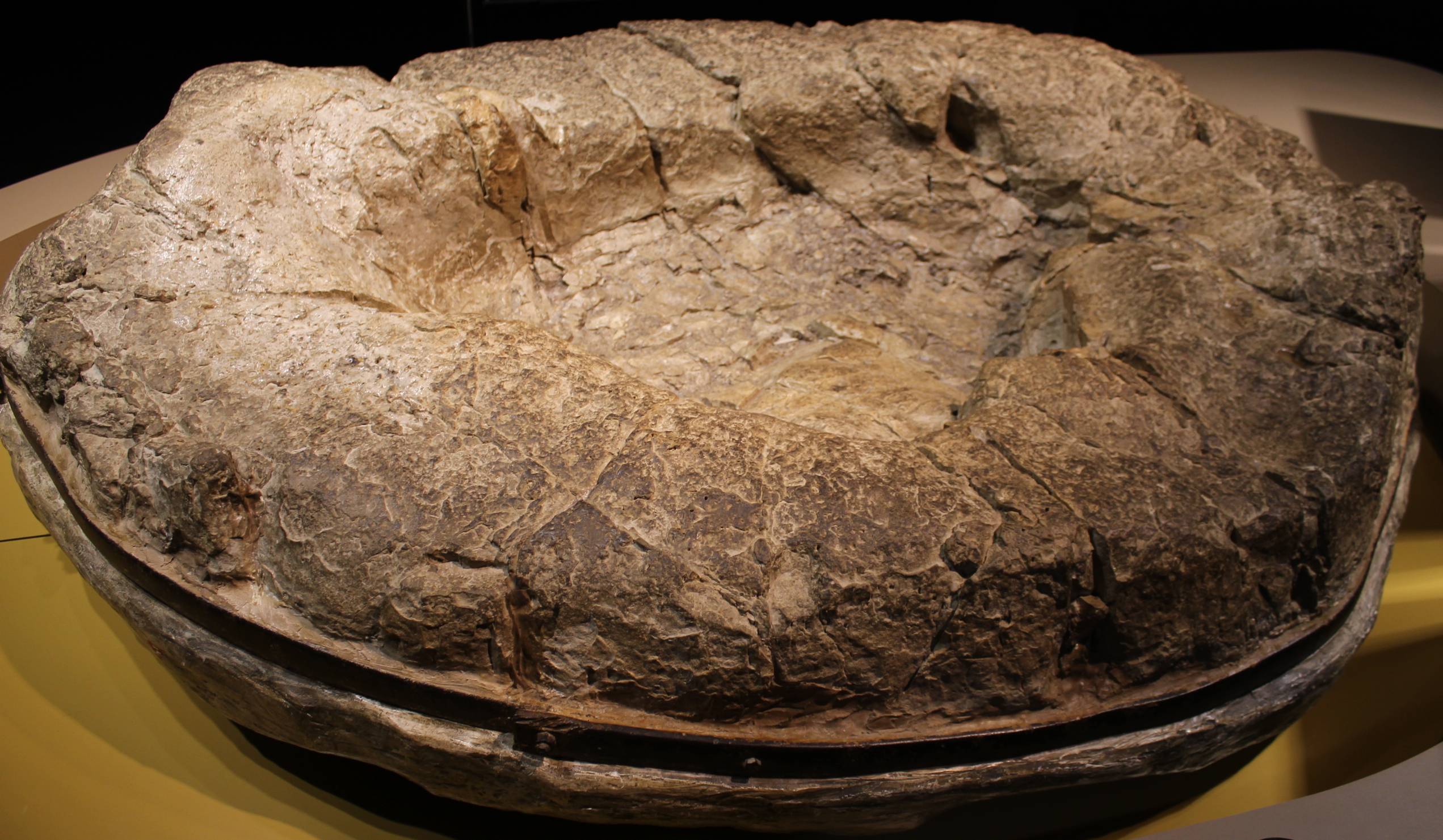
- Fossil of the sauropod dinosaur footprint ichnogenus Brontopodus
  †Brontopodus – type locality for genus
- Busycon – tentative report
- Cadulus
- Caestocorbula
  - †Caestocorbula crassaplica
  - †Caestocorbula crassiplica
  - †Caestocorbula suffalciata
  - †Caestocorbula terramaria
- Callianassa
- †Calliomphalus
  - †Calliomphalus americanus
- †Calyptosuchus – type locality for genus
  - †Calyptosuchus wellesi – type locality for species
- Calyptraea
- Cancellaria
- Cantharus – tentative report
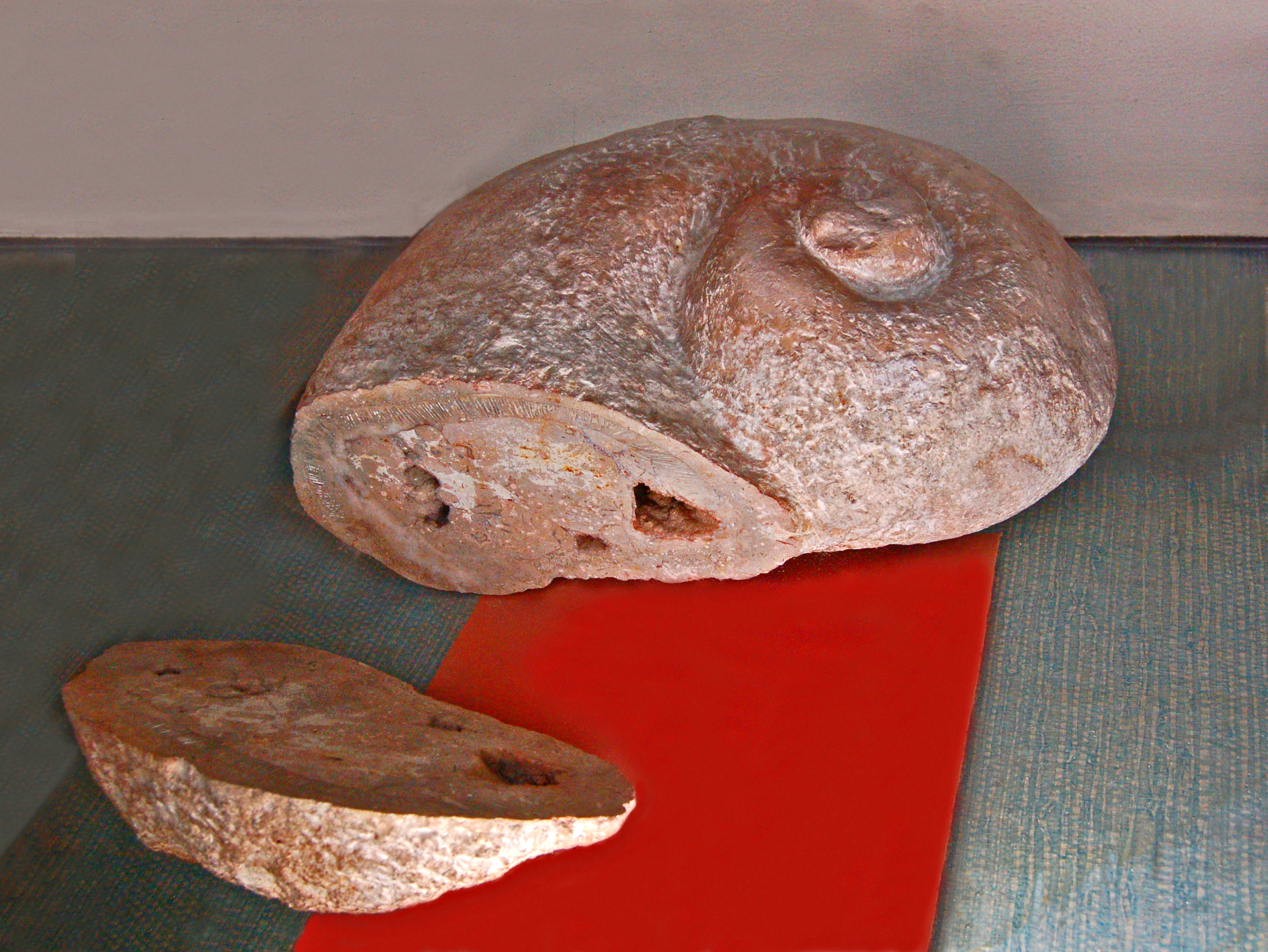
- Fossilized shell of the Cretaceous marine bivalve Caprina
  †Caprina
- Capulus
- Carcharias
- †Caririchnium
- Carota
- Caryophyllia
- †Caseosaurus – type locality for genus
  - †Caseosaurus crosbyensis – type locality for species
- †Casierius
- †Catactegenys – type locality for genus
- †Caturus
- †Caveola
- †Cedarosaurus
  - †Cedarosaurus weiskopfae
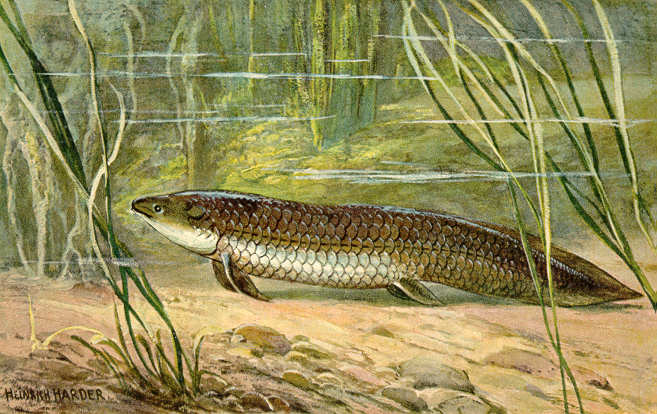
- Life restoration of the Late Triassic-Eocene lungfish Ceratodus
  †Ceratodus
- Cerithiella
  - †Cerithiella nodoliratum – or unidentified related form
  - †Cerithiella semirugatum
- Cerithium
- †Chamops
- †Champsosaurus
- †Chindesaurus
  - †Chindesaurus bryansmalli
- †Chinlea
- †Chirostenotes
- †Chupacabrachelys – type locality for genus
- Cidaris
- †Cimexomys
- †Cimoliasaurus
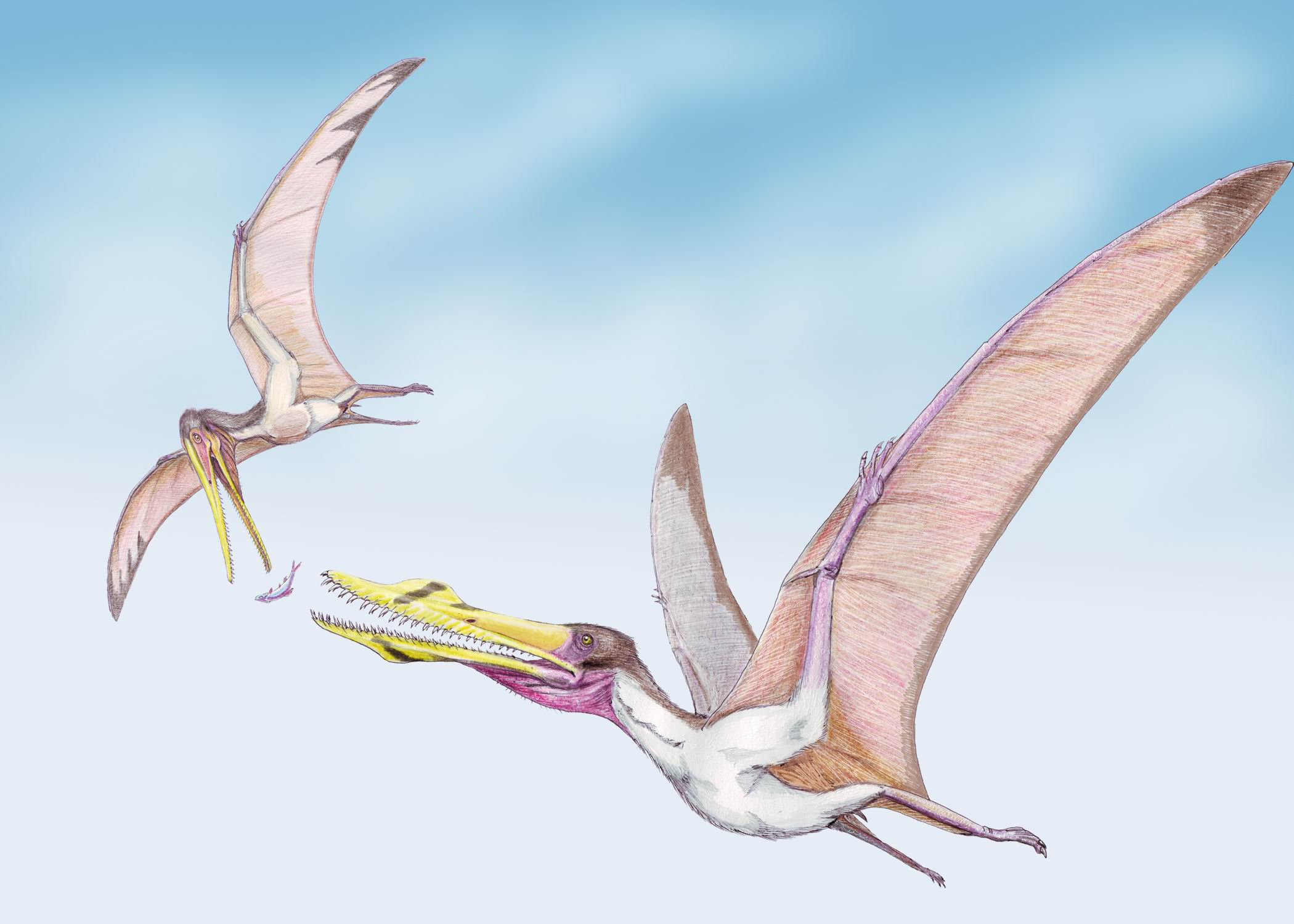
- Life restoration of the Late Cretaceous pterosaur Cimoliopterus (left) stealing fish from another pterosaur
  †Cimoliopterus
  - †Cimoliopterus dunni – type locality for species
- †Cimolodon
  - †Cimolodon electus – or unidentified comparable form
- †Cimolomys
  - †Cimolomys clarki
- †Clevosaurus – or unidentified comparable form
- †Clidastes
  - †Clidastes liodontus
- Cliona
- †Coahomasuchus – type locality for genus
  - †Coahomasuchus kahleorum – type locality for species
- †Coelodus
- †Coelophysis
- †Coilopoceras
  - †Coilopoceras springeri
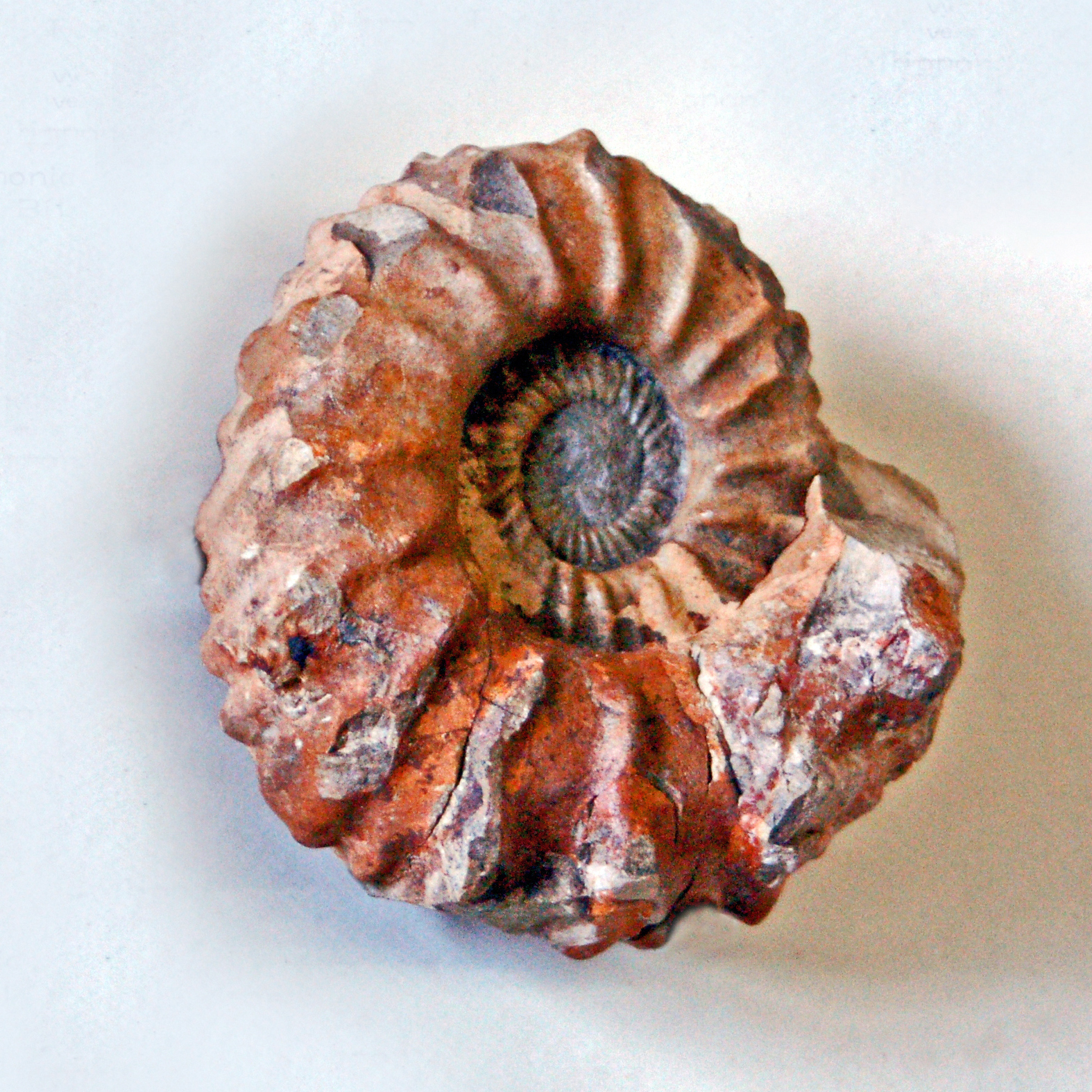
- Fossilized shell of the Late Cretaceous ammonoid Collignoniceras
  †Collignoniceras
  - †Collignoniceras woollgari
- †Colognathus – type locality for genus
- †Coniasaurus
- †Continuoolithus
- †Conulus
- Corbicula
- Corbula
- †Coupatezia
- Crassostrea
- †Crenella
  - †Crenella elegantula
  - †Crenella serica
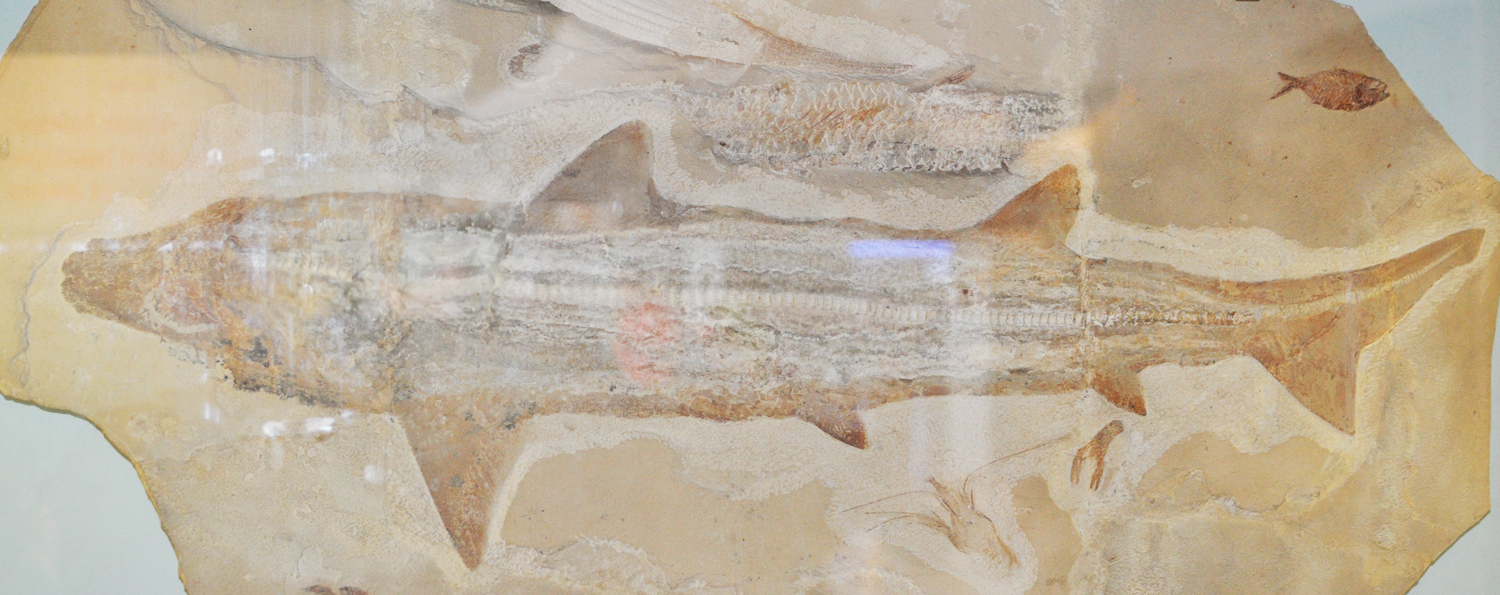
- Fossil of the Early Cretaceous-Eocene shark Cretolamna
  †Cretolamna
  - †Cretolamna appendiculata
- †Cretorectolobus
  - †Cretorectolobus olsoni – or unidentified comparable form
- †Crosbysaurus – type locality for genus
  - †Crosbysaurus harrisae – type locality for species
- Cucullaea
  - †Cucullaea capax
  - †Cucullaea powersi
- Cuspidaria
  - †Cuspidaria ampulla
  - †Cuspidaria grandis
  - †Cuspidaria grovensis
- †Cyathophora
- †Cyclothyris
- Cylichna
  - †Cylichna incisa
- †Cymatoceras
- †Cymella
- Cyzicus – tentative report
- †Dallasaurus – type locality for genus
  - †Dallasaurus turneri – type locality for species
- Dasmosmilia
  - †Dasmosmilia kochii – type locality for species
- Dasyatis
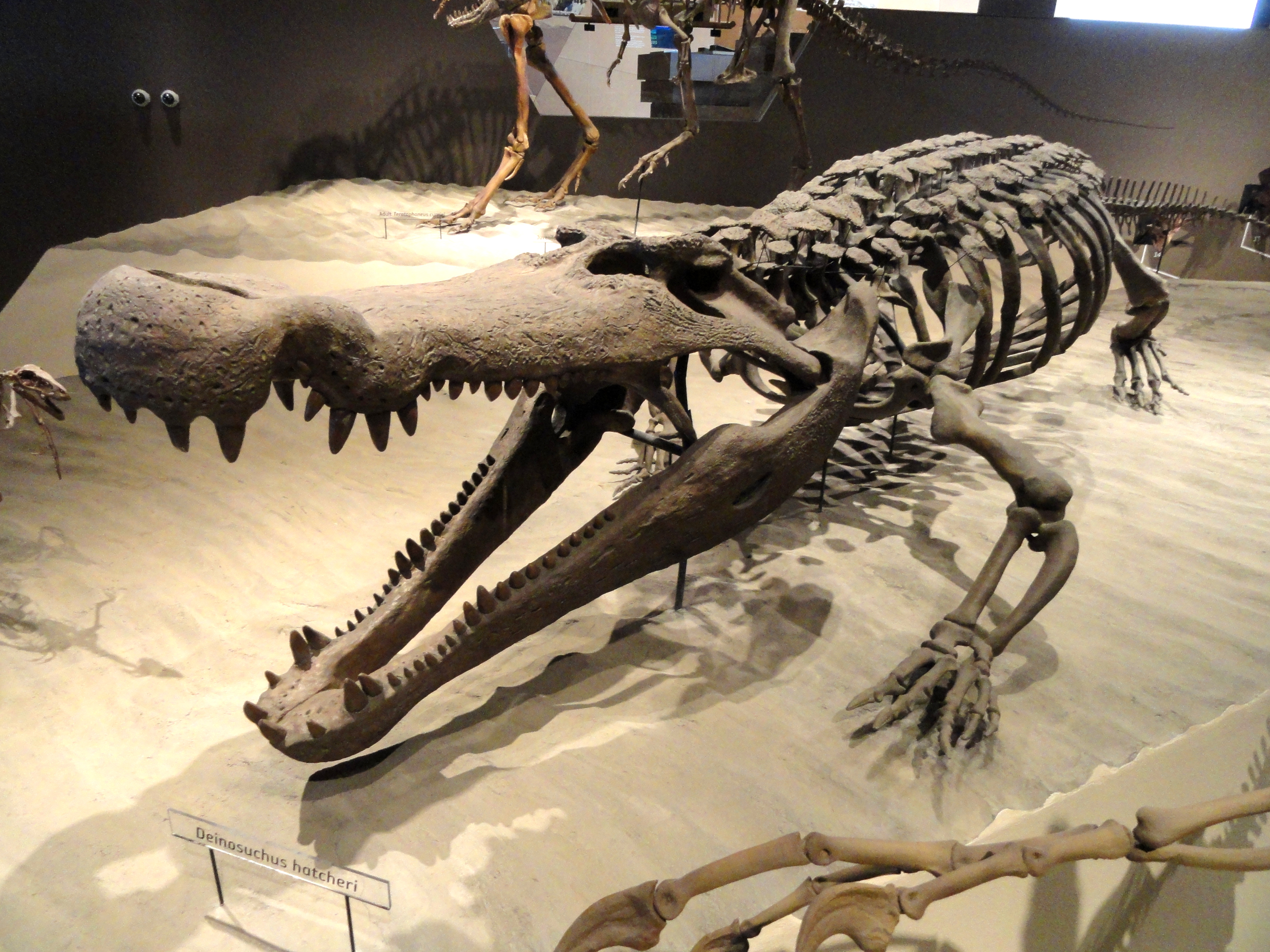
- Mounted fossilized skeleton of the Late Cretaceous Alligator relative Deinosuchus
  †Deinosuchus
  - †Deinosuchus riograndensis
  - †Deinosuchus rugosus – type locality for species
- Dentalium
  - †Dentalium leve
  - †Dentalium pauperculum
- †Desmatosuchus
  - †Desmatosuchus haplocerus
  - †Desmatosuchus smalli – type locality for species
  - †Desmatosuchus spurensis – type locality for species
- †Desmoceras
- Diodora – tentative report
- †Diphydontosaurus – or unidentified related form
- †Diploastrea
- Discorbis
- †Discoscaphites
  - †Discoscaphites conradi
- †Doswellia
- †Douvilleiceras
- †Dreissena
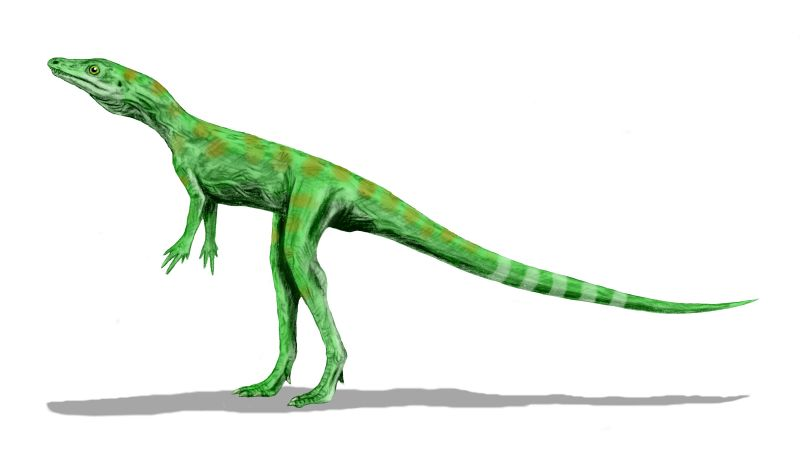
- Restoration of the Late Triassic dinosaur relative Dromomeron
  †Dromomeron
  - †Dromomeron gregorii – type locality for species
- †Dryptosaurus
- †Dufrenoyia
  - †Dufrenoyia justinae
- †Durania
- †Echinocorys
- †Ecphora
- †Ectenosaurus
- †Edmontonia – or unidentified comparable form
- †Elea – tentative report
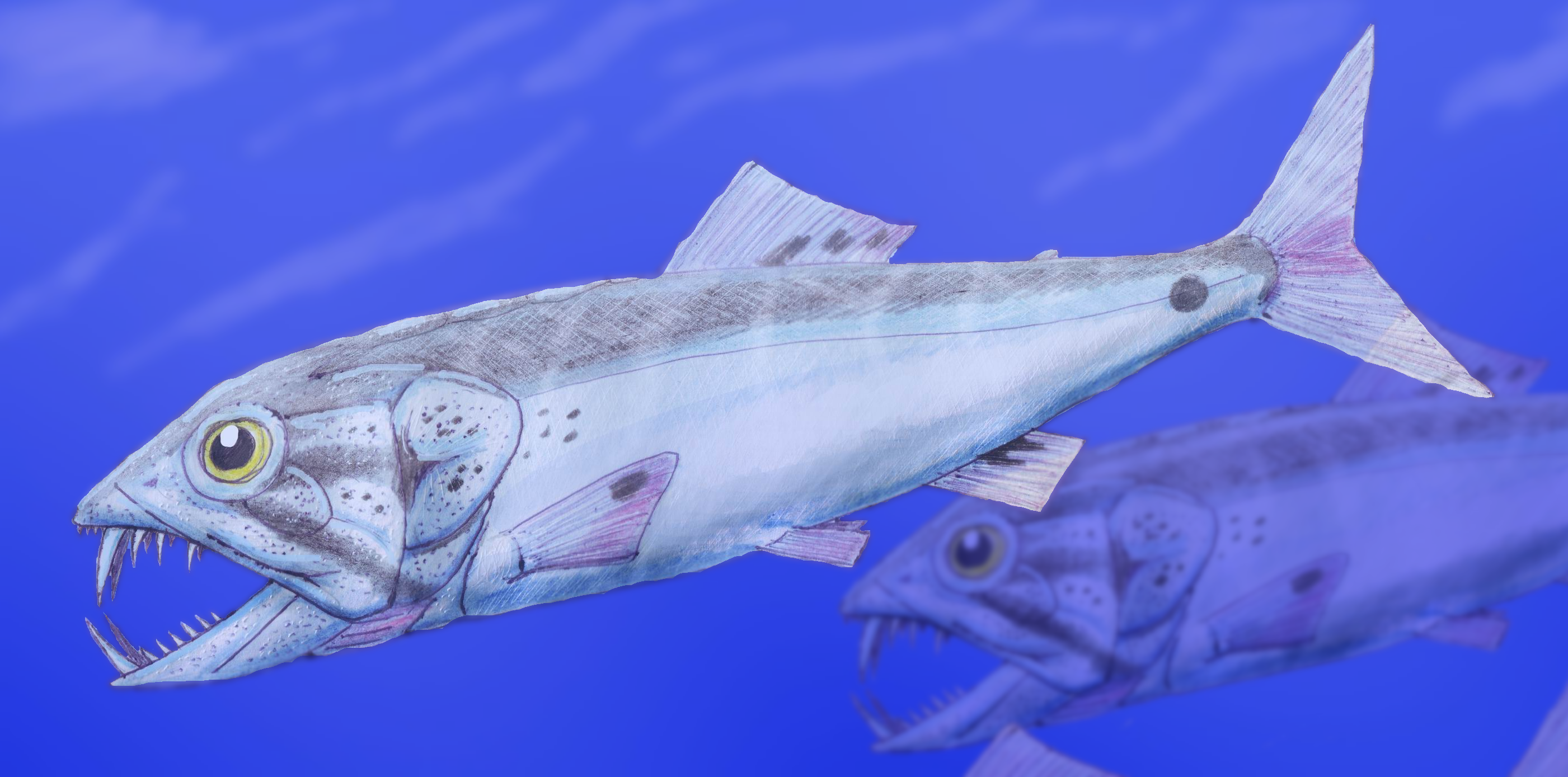
- Restoration of the Early Cretaceous-Eocene bony fish Enchodus, or the "saber-toothed herring"
  †Enchodus
- †Episcoposaurus – type locality for genus
  - †Episcoposaurus haplocerus – type locality for species
- †Epitonium
  - †Epitonium sillimani
- †Eubostrychoceras
- †Eucalycoceras
- †Eugyra
- †Euhoplites – tentative report
- †Eulima
- †Euomphaloceras
- †Eupachydiscus
- †Euspira
- †Eutrephoceras
- †Ewingia – type locality for genus
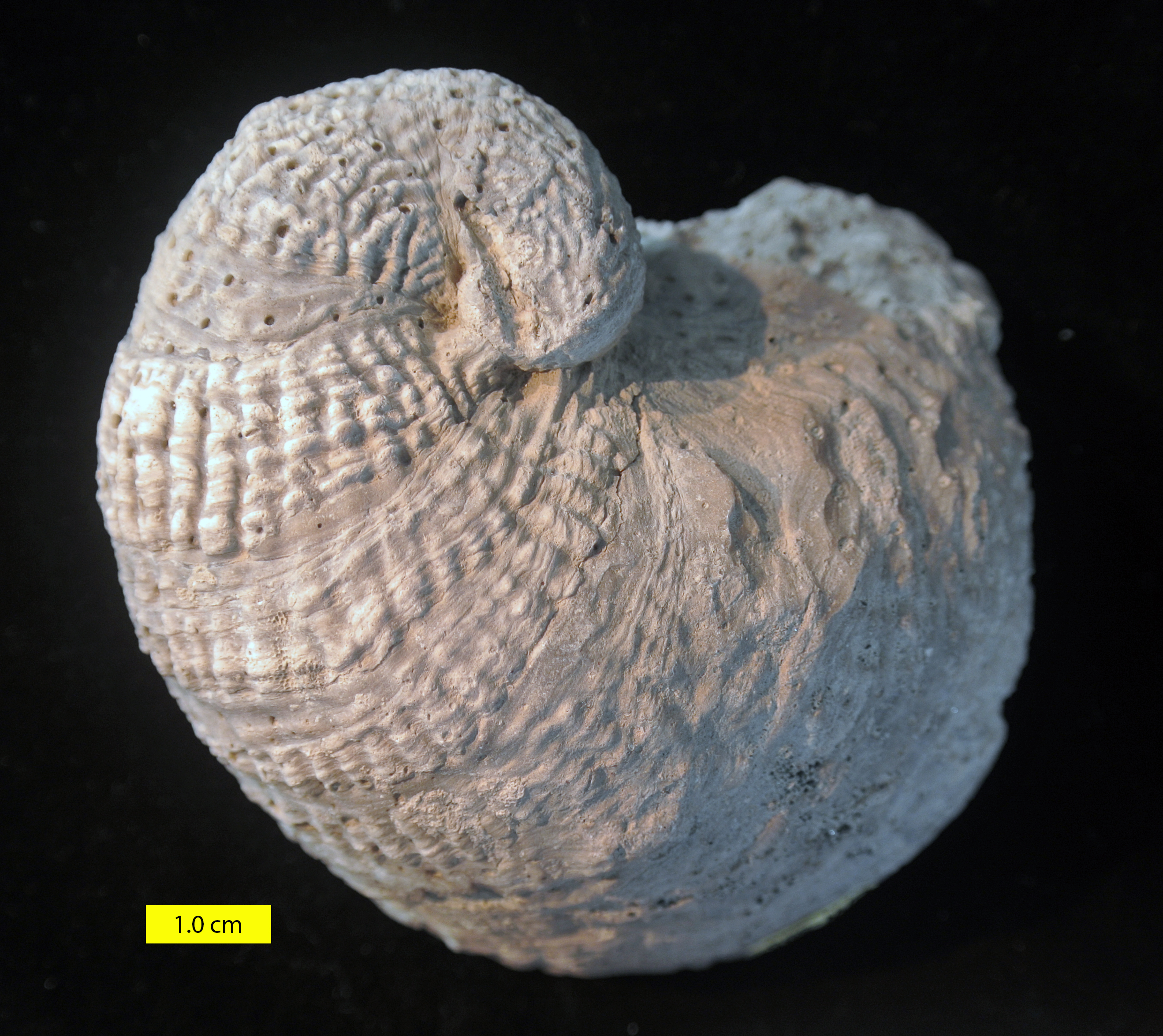
- Fossilized shell of the Jurassic-Cretaceous foam oyster Exogyra
  †Exogyra
  - †Exogyra cancellata
  - †Exogyra costata
- †Fagesia
- †Faujasia
- †Favia
- †Flexomornis – type locality for genus
  - †Flexomornis howei – type locality for species
- †Flickia
- †Forbesiceras
- †Forresteria
- Fusinus
- Galeorhinus
- Gastrochaena
- Gegania
- †Gervillia
- Ginglymostoma
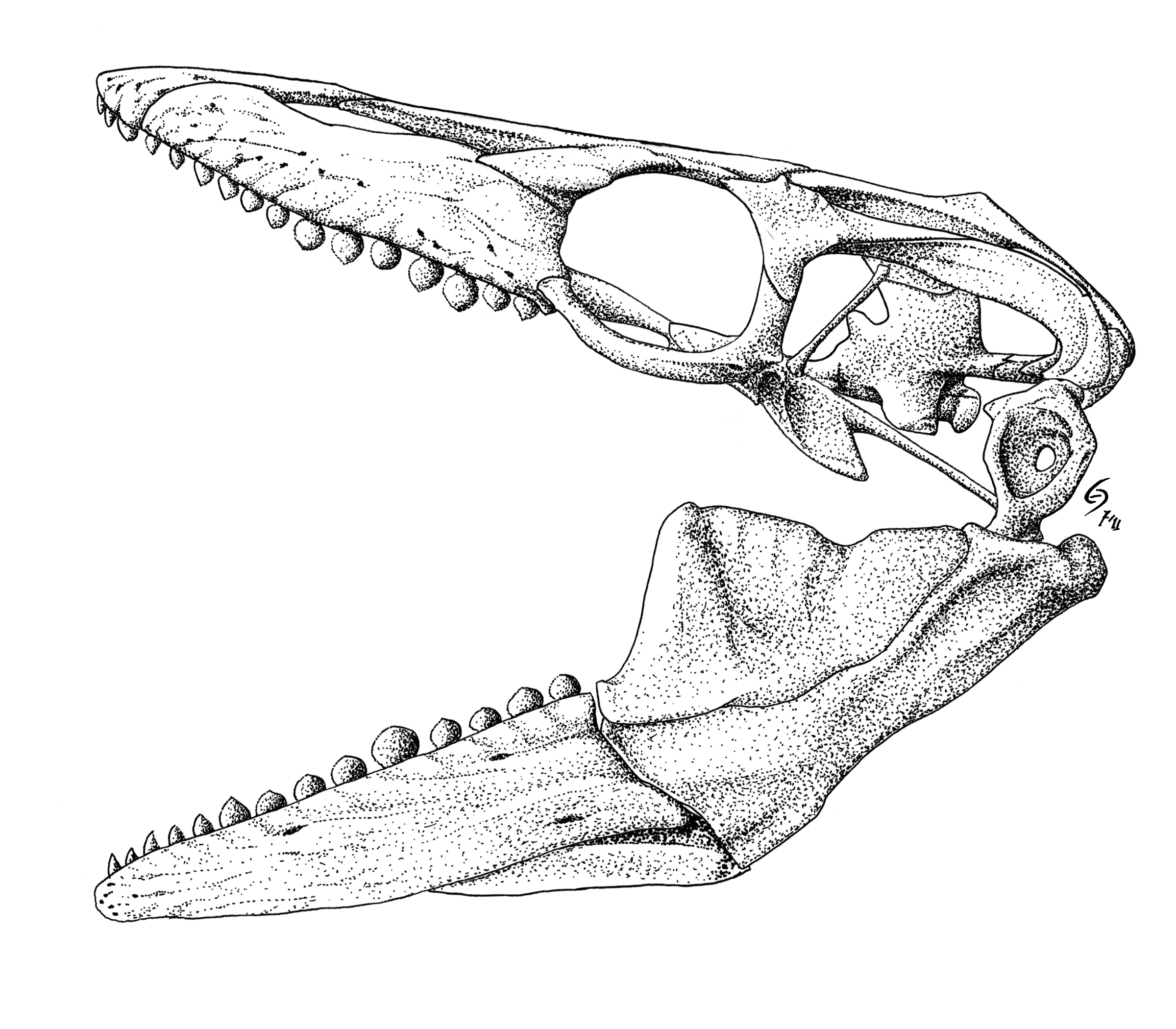
- Illustration of a reconstructed skull of the Late Cretaceous mosasaur Globidens
  †Globidens
  - †Globidens dakotensis
- Globigerina
- Glossus
- Glycymeris
  - †Glycymeris rotundata
- †Glyptops – tentative report
- †Gobiates
- †Gryphaea
- †Gryposaurus – tentative report
- †Gypsichnites
- †Gyronchus
- Haminoea – tentative report
- †Hamites
- †Hamulus
- †Helicoceras
  - †Helicoceras navarroense
- †Hemicalypterus – tentative report
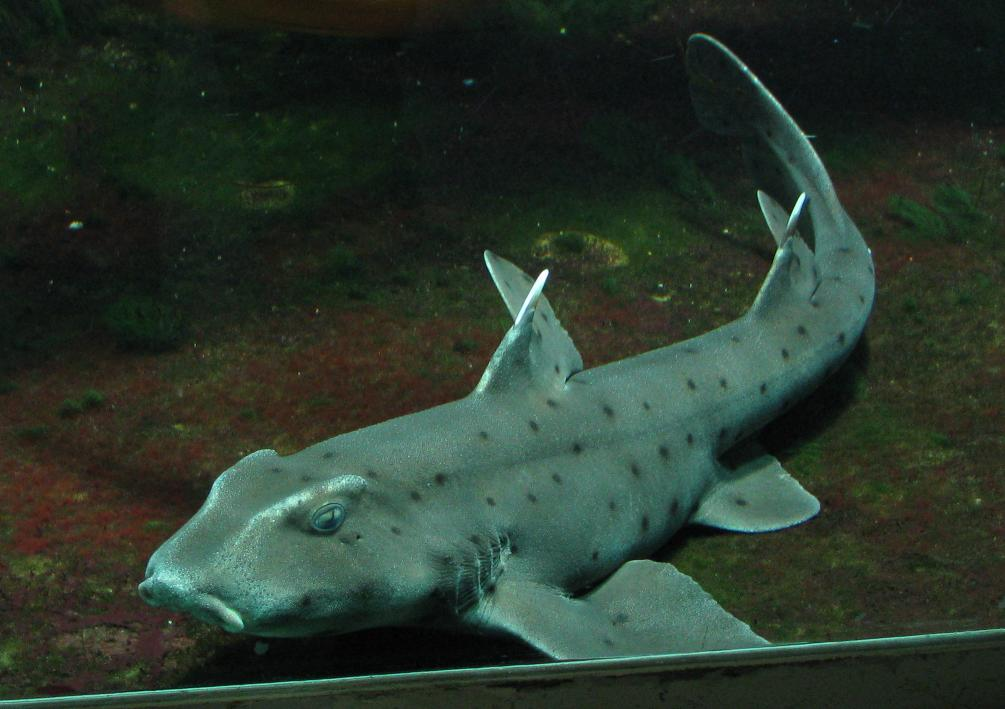
- A living Heterodontus, or bullhead shark
  Heterodontus
- †Heteromorpha
- Hexanchus
- Homarus
- †Hoplochelys
- †Hoploscaphites
- †Hybodus
- †Hydnophora – tentative report
- †Hypophylloceras
- †Ichthyodectes
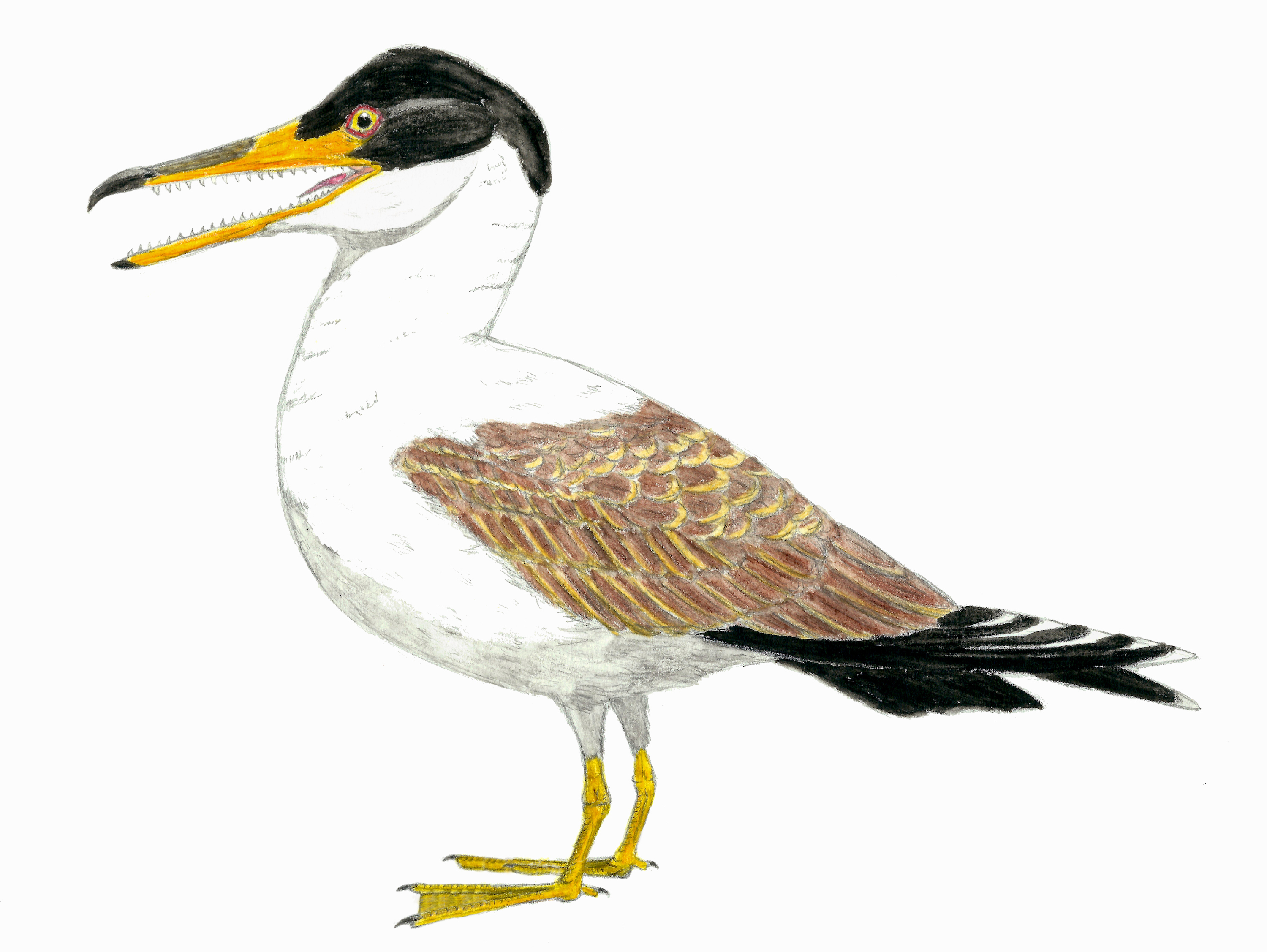
- Restoration of the Late Cretaceous toothed bird Ichthyornis
  †Ichthyornis
  - †Ichthyornis dispar
- †Idoceras
- †Iguanodon – or unidentified comparable form
- †Inoceramus
  - †Inoceramus anomalus – or unidentified comparable form
  - †Inoceramus arnoldi
  - †Inoceramus arvanus
  - †Inoceramus balticus
  - †Inoceramus cordiformis – or unidentified comparable form
  - †Inoceramus deformis
  - †Inoceramus dimidius
  - †Inoceramus fragilis
  - †Inoceramus prefragilis
  - †Inoceramus vanuxemi – tentative report
- †Irenesauripus
- †Isastrea
- †Ischyrhiza
  - †Ischyrhiza avonicola
  - †Ischyrhiza mira
- †Jeletzkytes
  - †Jeletzkytes brevis
- †Kamerunoceras
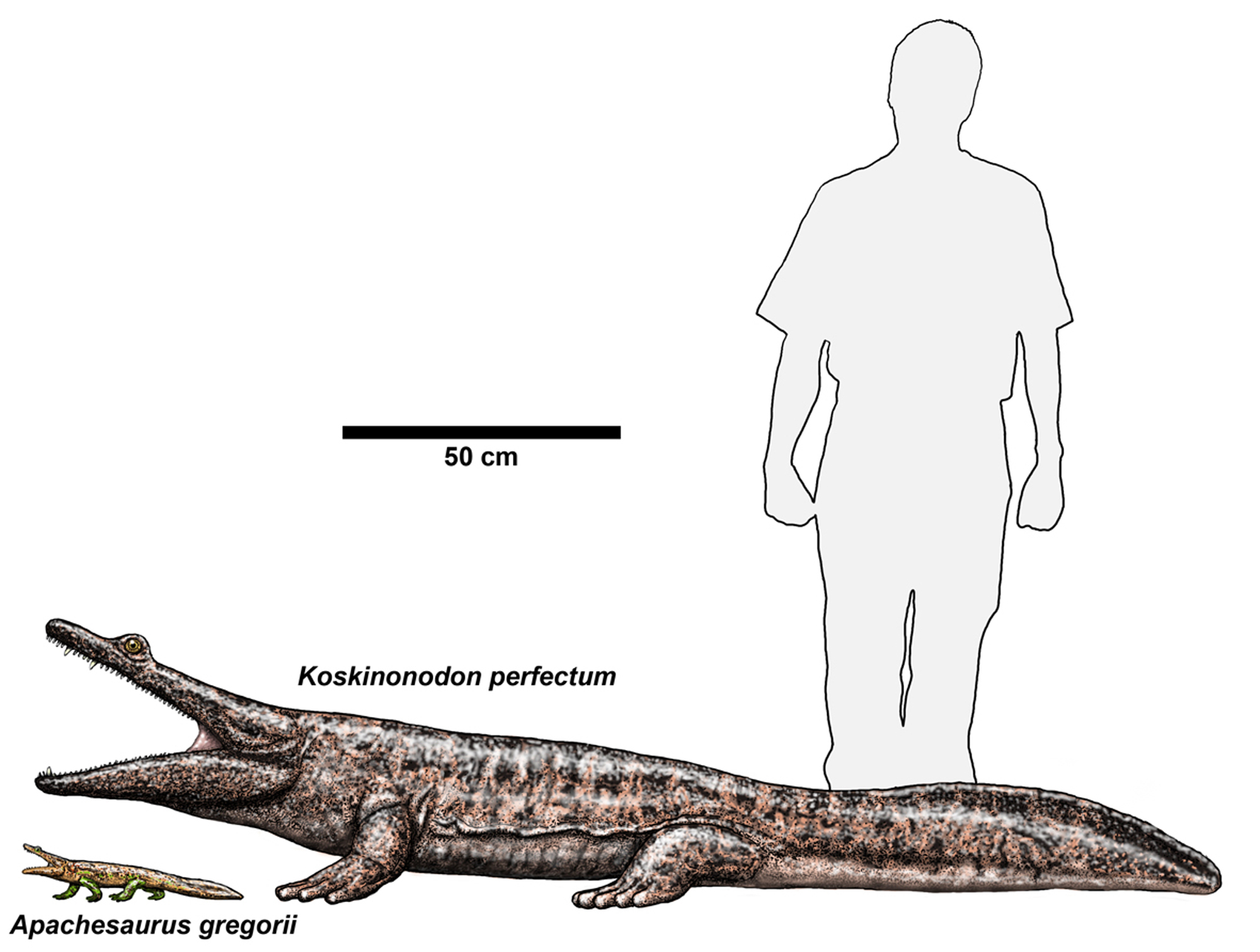
- Life restoration at various ages of the Late Triassic amphibian Koskinonodon with an anachronistic human to scale
  †Koskinonodon – type locality for genus
- †Kritosaurus
- Lamna
- Latiaxis
- †Lepidotes
- Lepisosteus
- †Leptorhynchos – type locality for genus
  - †Leptorhynchos gaddisi – type locality for species
- †Leptostyrax
- †Leptosuchus
  - †Leptosuchus crosbiensis – type locality for species
  - †Leptosuchus imperfecta – type locality for species
  - †Leptosuchus studeri – type locality for species
- †Lewesiceras
- †Leyvachelys
  - †Leyvachelys cipadi
- †Libognathus – type locality for genus
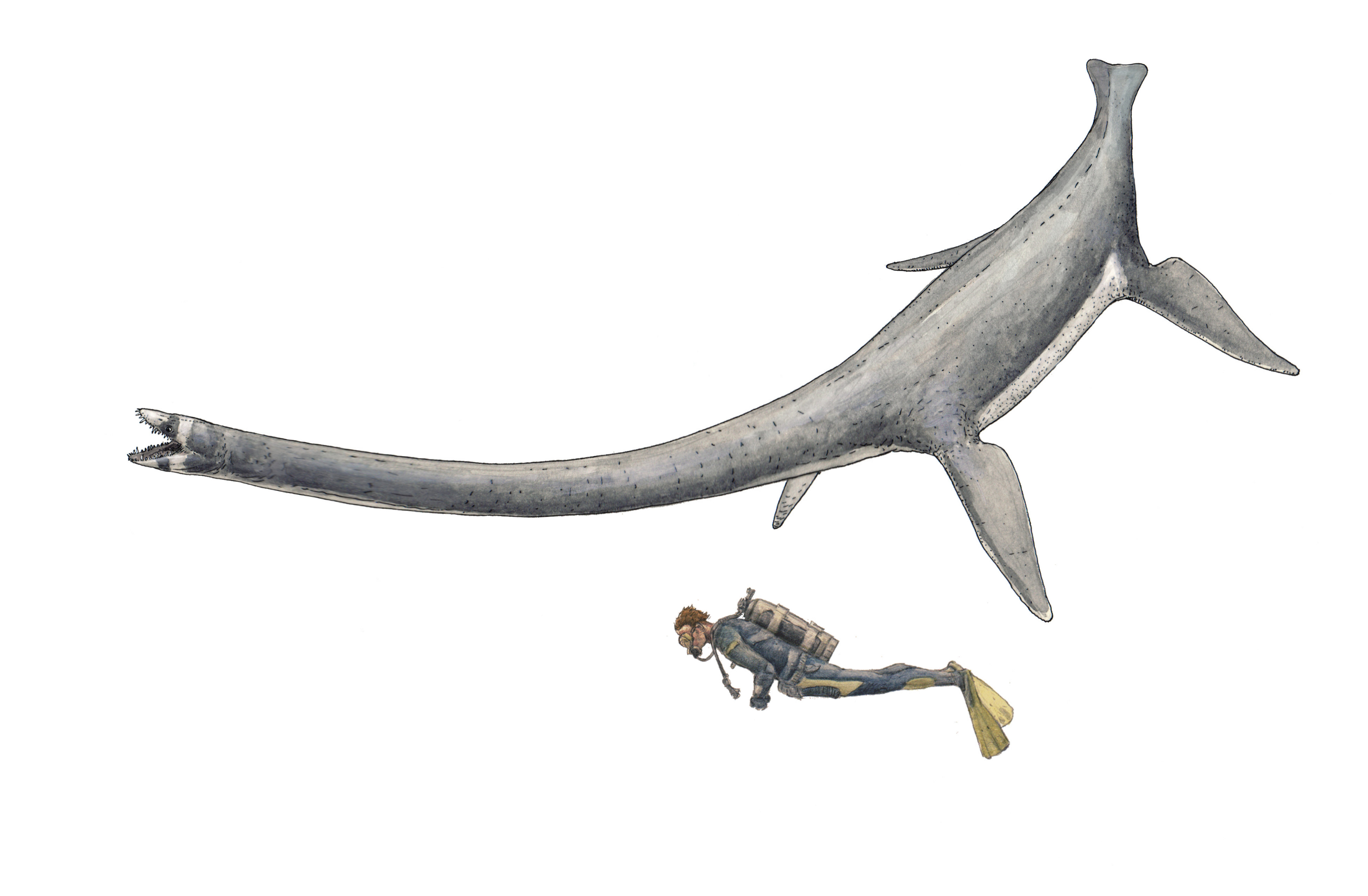
- Life restoration of the Late Cretaceous plesiosaur Libonectes with an anachronistic scuba diver to scale
  †Libonectes
  - †Libonectes morgani – type locality for species
- Lima
- Limatula
- †Linearis
- Lingula
- †Linter
- †Linthia
- Linuparus
- †Lioestheria – tentative report
- Liquidambar – tentative report
- †Lissodus
- †Lithacoceras
- Lithophaga
- †Lonchidion
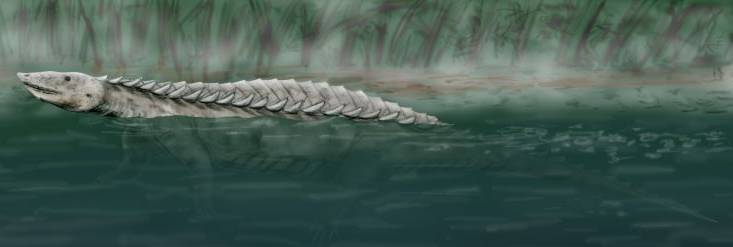
- Life restoration of the Late Triassic aetosaur Longosuchus
  †Longosuchus
  - †Longosuchus meadei – type locality for species
- Lopha
  - †Lopha falcata
  - †Lopha mesenterica
- †Lucasuchus – type locality for genus
  - †Lucasuchus hunti – type locality for species
- Lucina
- †Macrepistius
- †Magnoavipes – type locality for genus
- †Malerisaurus
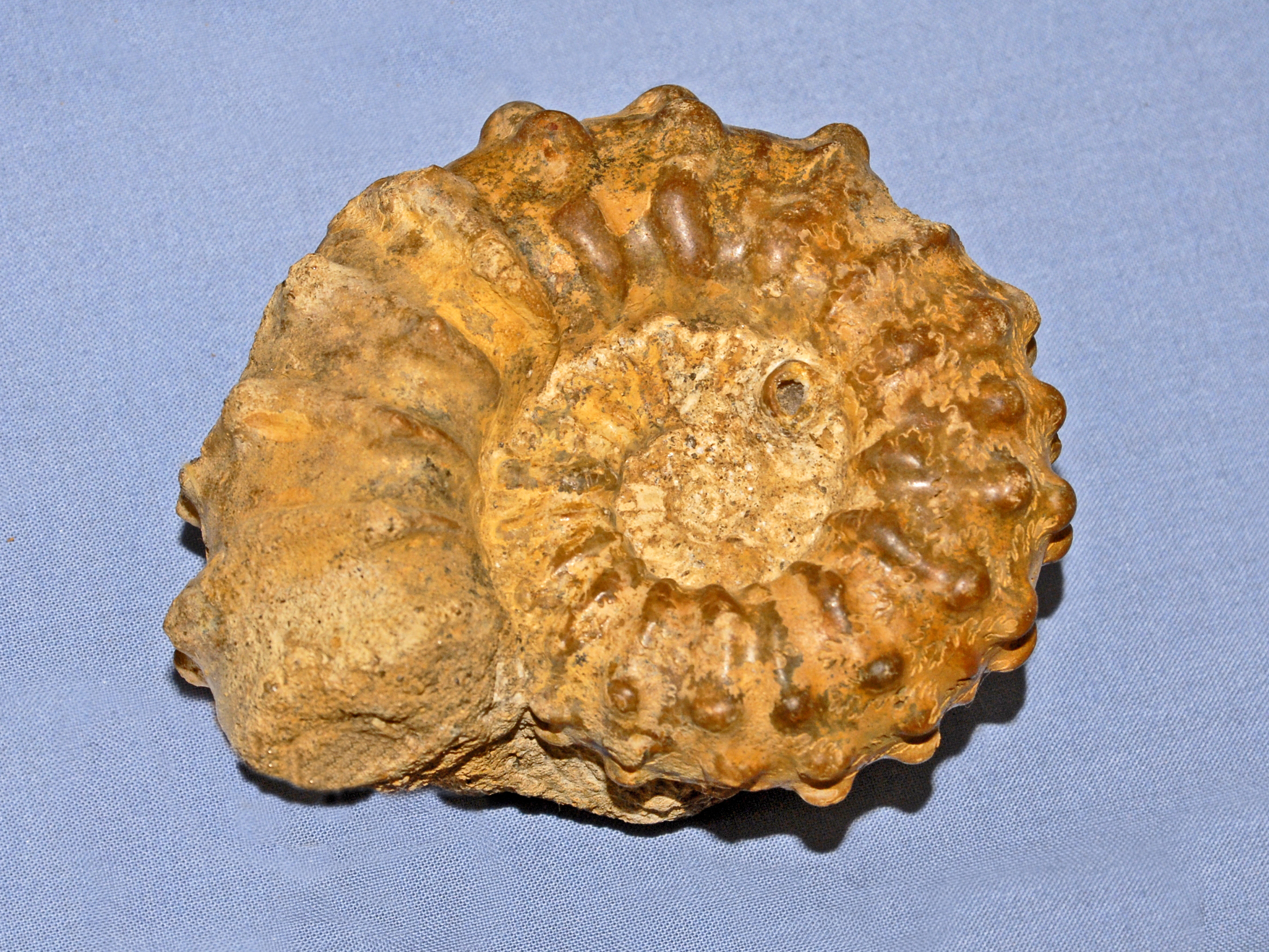
- Fossilized shell of the Late Cretaceous ammonoid cephalopod Mammites
  †Mammites
- †Mantelliceras
  - †Mantelliceras cantianum
- †Mariella
- †Martinectes
  - †Martinectes bonneri
- †Mathilda
- Megalomphalus – or unidentified comparable form
- †Megalosauropus – tentative report
- Melanatria
- Membranipora
- †Meniscoessus
- †Menuites
- Mesalia
- †Mesodma
- †Metoicoceras
  - †Metoicoceras geslinianum
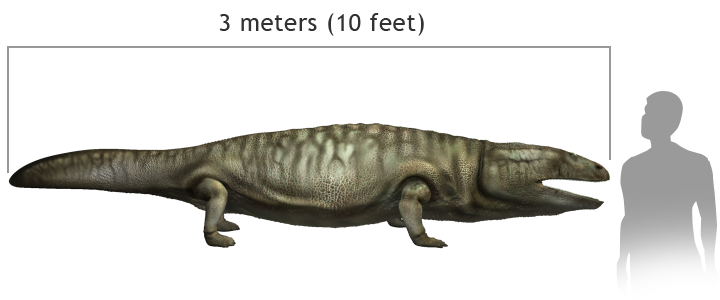
- Life restoration of the Late Triassic amphibian Metoposaurus with an anachronistic human to scale
  †Metoposaurus
  - †Metoposaurus bakeri – type locality for species
- †Micraster
- †Modiolus
  - †Modiolus sedesclaris
  - †Modiolus sedesclarus
- Monodonta – tentative report
- †Monopleura – tentative report
- †Morea
- †Mortoniceras
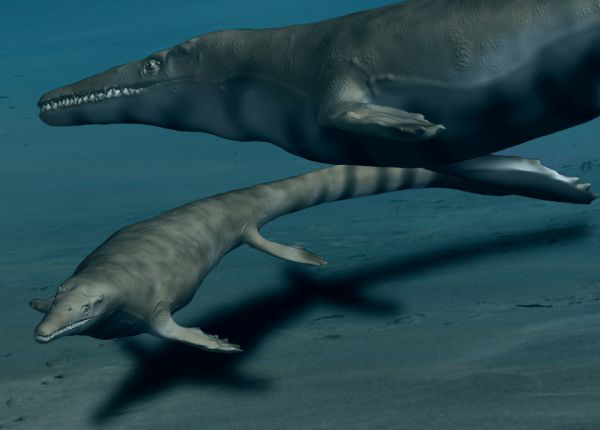
- Life restoration of two of the Late Cretaceous Mosasaurus
  †Mosasaurus
  - †Mosasaurus missouriensis – tentative report
- †Mytilus
- †Naomichelys
- Natica
- Nebrius
- †Neithea
  - †Neithea bexarensis
  - †Neithea quinquecostata
- †Neocardioceras
  - †Neocardioceras juddii
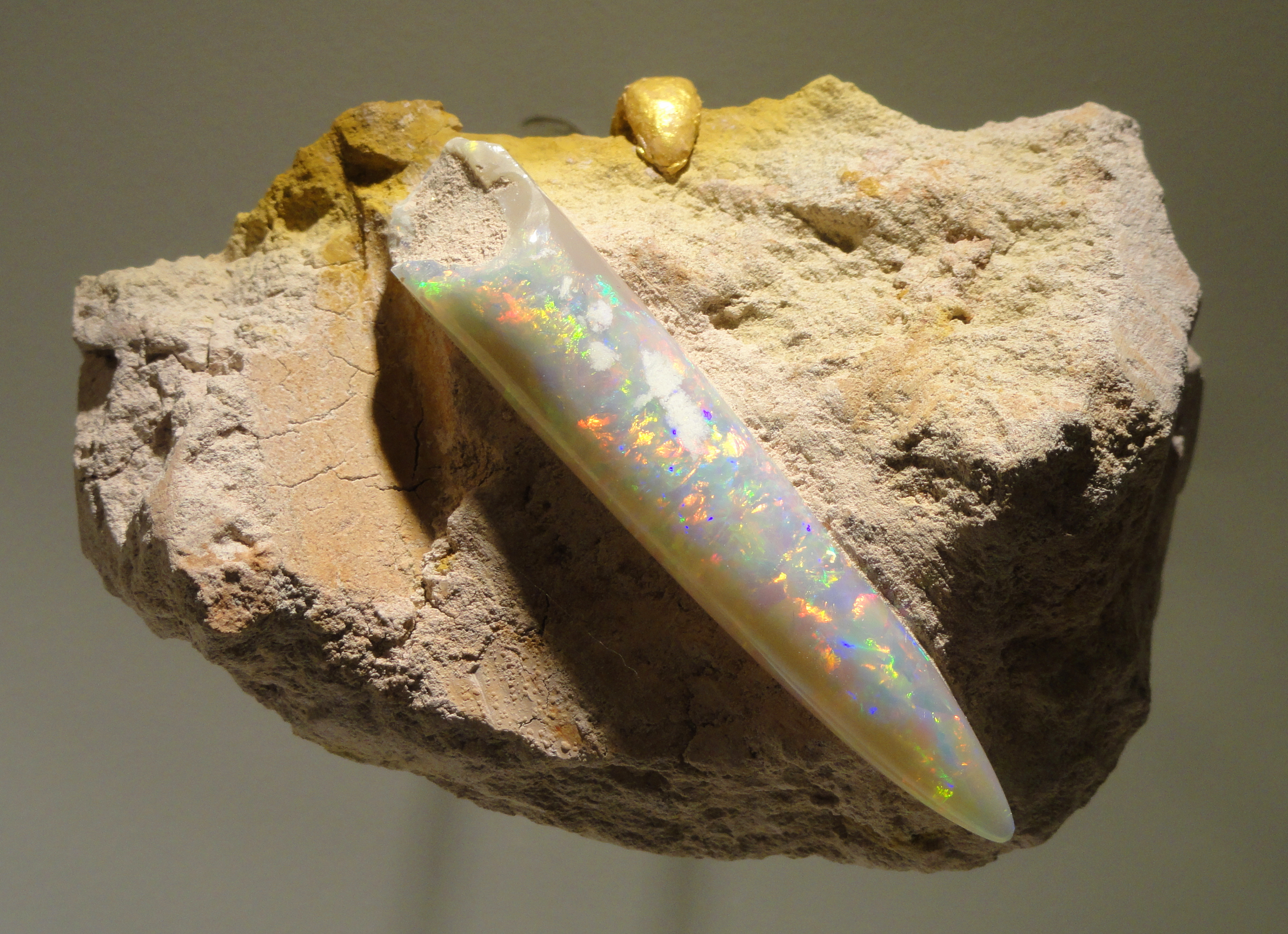
- Opalized guard of the belemnoid cephalopod Neohibolites
  †Neohibolites
- †Neoptychites
- †Nerinea – tentative report
- Nerita
- Neritina
- †Nostoceras
  - †Nostoceras approximans
  - †Nostoceras splendidum
- Nucula
  - †Nucula camia
  - †Nucula cuneifrons
  - †Nucula percrassa
- †Nyssa
- †Odaxosaurus
  - †Odaxosaurus piger
- Odontaspis
- †Oklatheridium
  - †Oklatheridium minax
  - †Oklatheridium szalayi
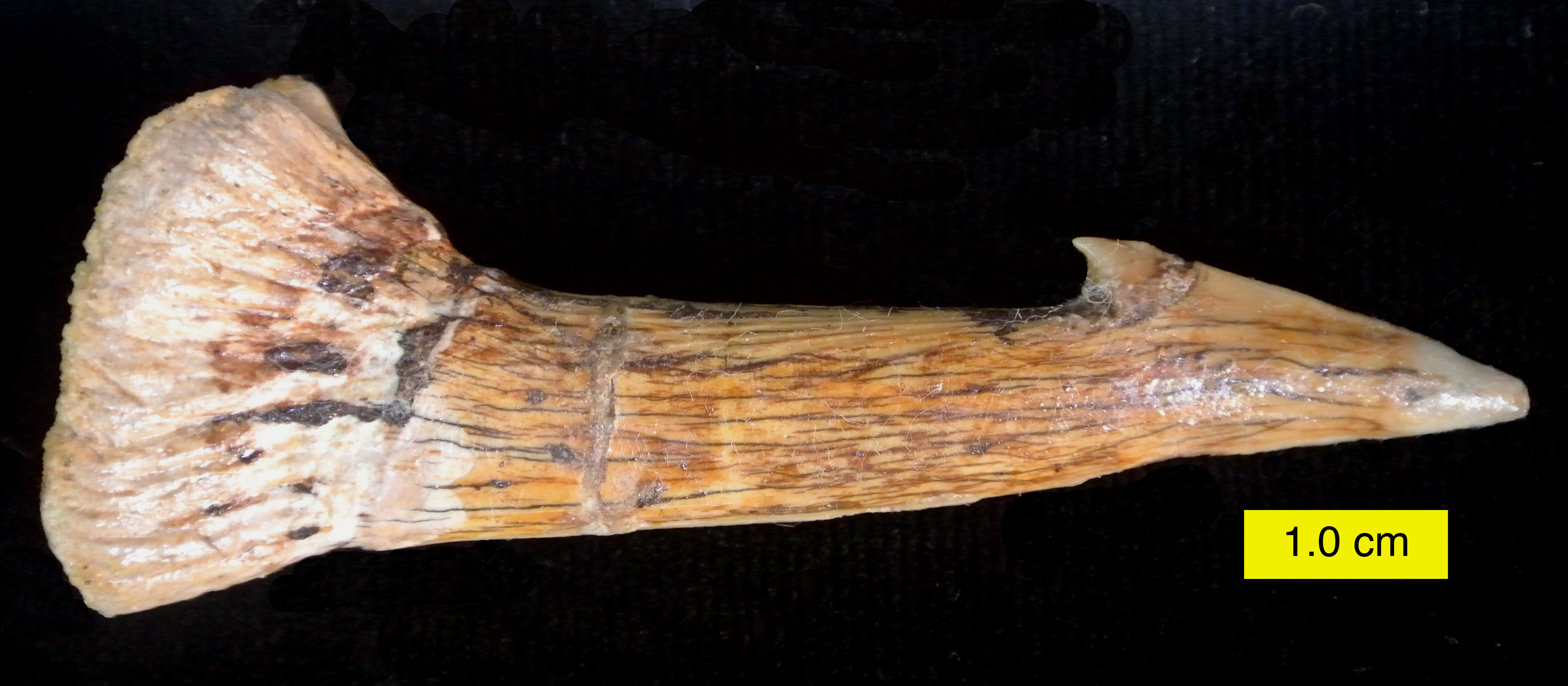
- Fossilized tooth of the Late Cretaceous giant sawfish Onchopristis
  †Onchopristis
- †Onchosaurus
- †Ophiomorpha
- †Ophiopsis – tentative report
- †Opis
- †Ornithomimus
- †Ostlingoceras
- Ostrea
- †Otischalkia – type locality for genus
  - †Otischalkia elderae – type locality for species
- †Oxyrhina
- †Pachycheilosuchus – type locality for genus
  - †Pachycheilosuchus trinquei – type locality for species
- †Pachydesmoceras
- †Pachydiscus
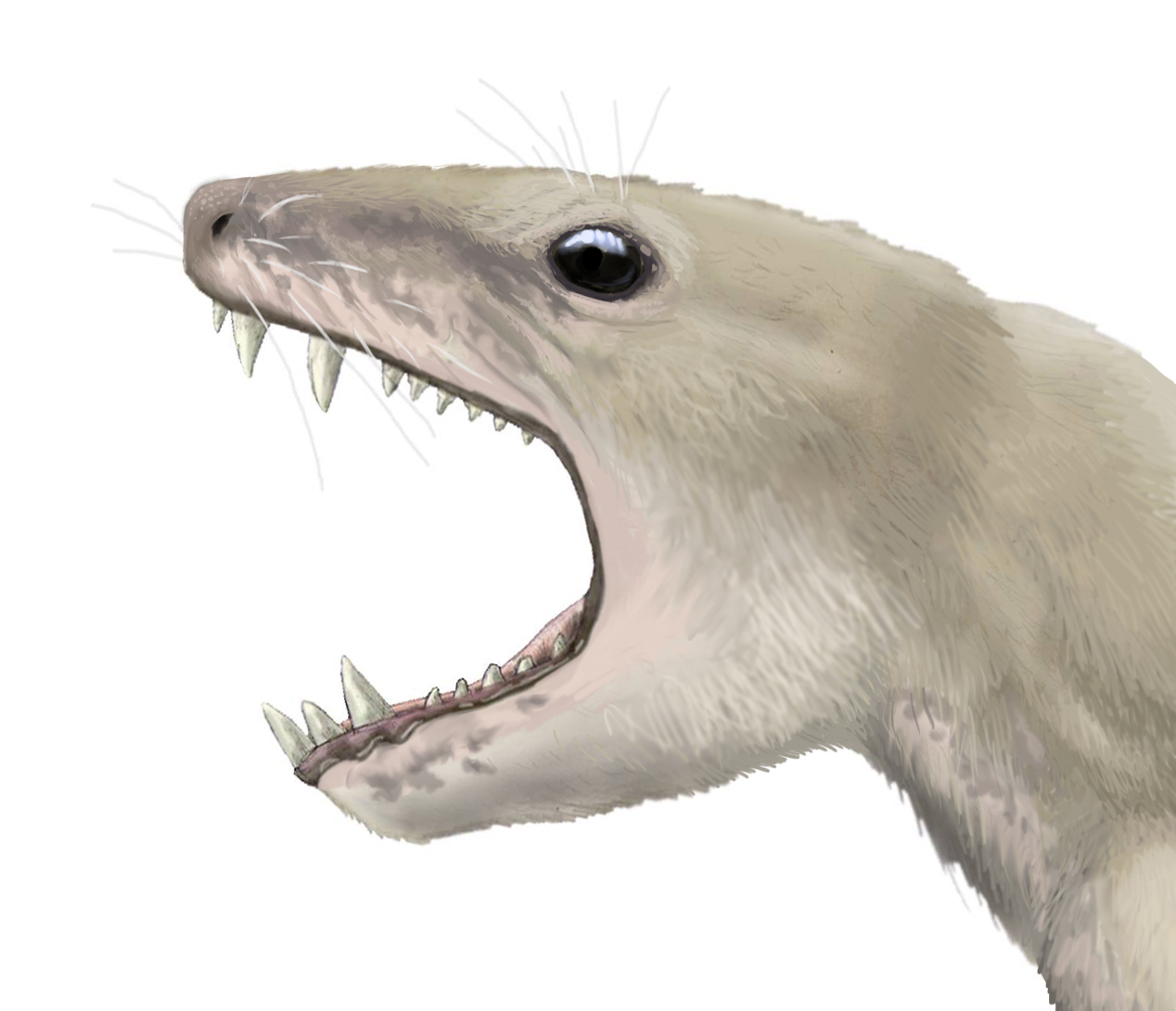
- Restorative portrait of the Early Jurassic synapsid (mammal precursor) Pachygenelus
  †Pachygenelus
- †Pachymelania
- Pagurus
- †Palaeobalistum
- †Palaeoctonus
- †Paleorhinus
  - †Paleorhinus sawini – type locality for species
- †Paluxysaurus – type locality for genus. Now regarded as a junior synonym of Sauroposeidon.
  - †Paluxysaurus jonesi – type locality for species. Now regarded as a junior synonym of Sauroposeidon proteles.
- †Paluxysuchus – type locality for genus
  - †Paluxysuchus newmani – type locality for species
- †Panis
- Panopea
- †Pappotherium – type locality for genus
- †Paracimexomys
- †Paramicrodon – type locality for genus
- †Paranomia
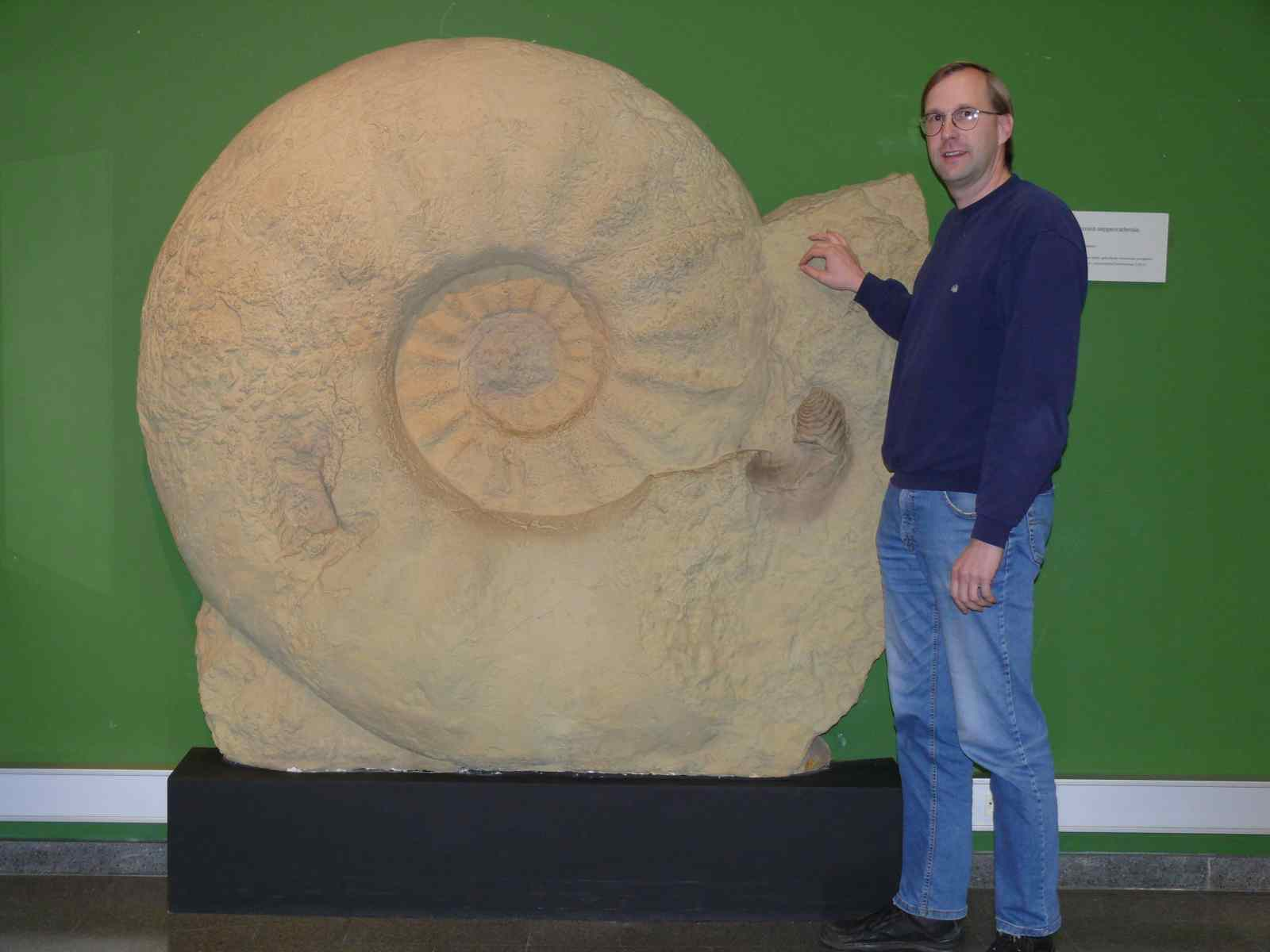
- Fossilized shell of the Late Cretaceous ammonoid cephalopod Parapuzosia with a human indicating its size
  †Parapuzosia
- †Parasuchus
- †Paratypothorax
- †Paronychodon
  - †Paronychodon lacustris – or unidentified comparable form
- †Pawpawsaurus – type locality for genus
  - †Pawpawsaurus campbelli – type locality for species
- †Pecten
- †Pekinosaurus – or unidentified related form
  - †Pekinosaurus olseni
- Perna – report made of unidentified related form or using admittedly obsolete nomenclature
- Pholadidea
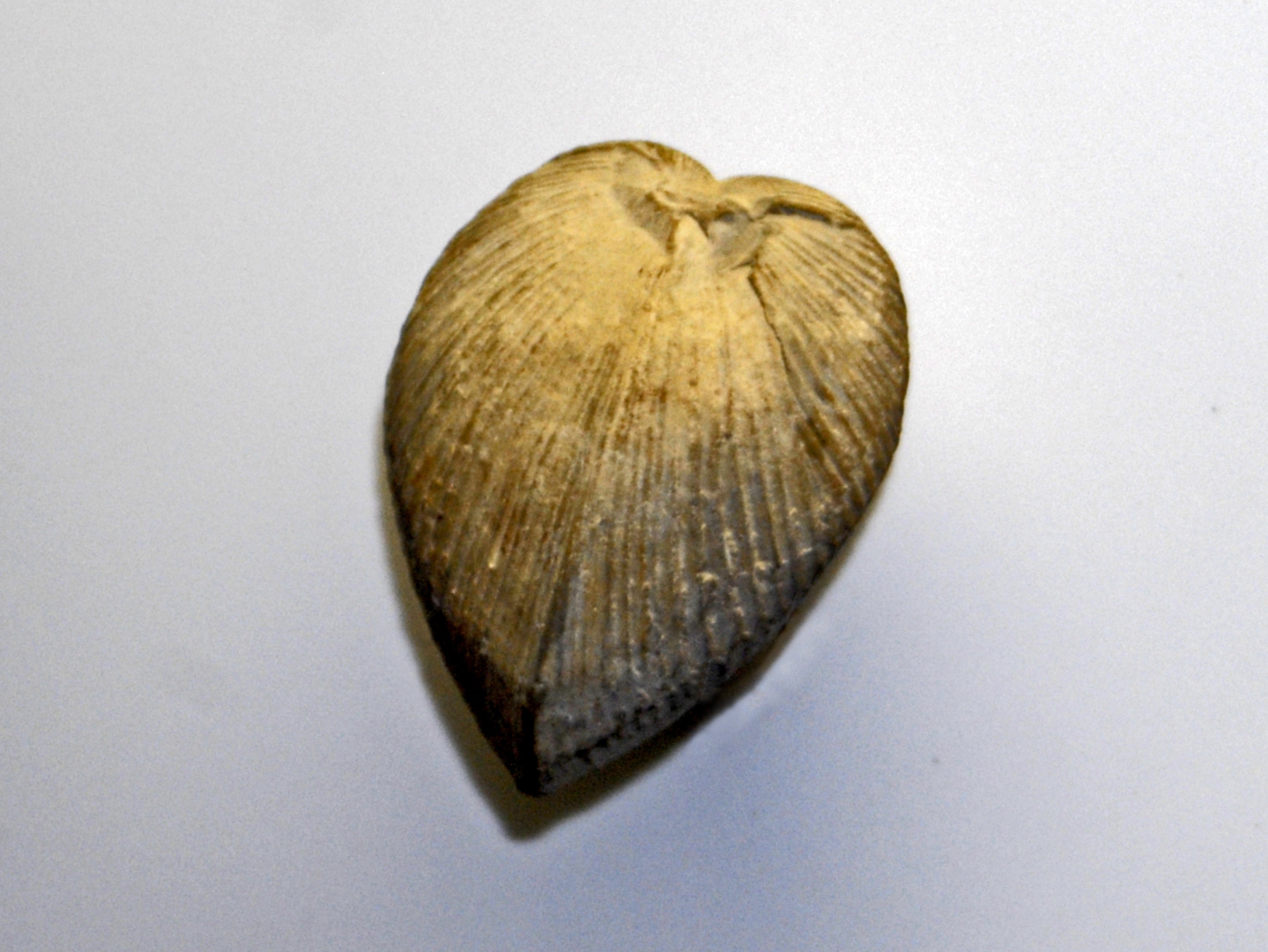
- Fossilized shell of the Early Triassic-Pliocene marine bivalve Pholadomya
  Pholadomya
  - †Pholadomya occidentalis
- Pholas
- †Phymosoma
- †Phytosaurus
- †Pinna
- Pitar
- †Placenticeras
  - †Placenticeras meeki
- †Planocephalosaurus
- †Platecarpus
  - †Platecarpus planifrons
  - †Platecarpus somenensis – or unidentified comparable form
  - †Platecarpus tympaniticus
- †Platyceramus
  - †Platyceramus cycloides
  - †Platyceramus mantelli - or unidentified loosely related form
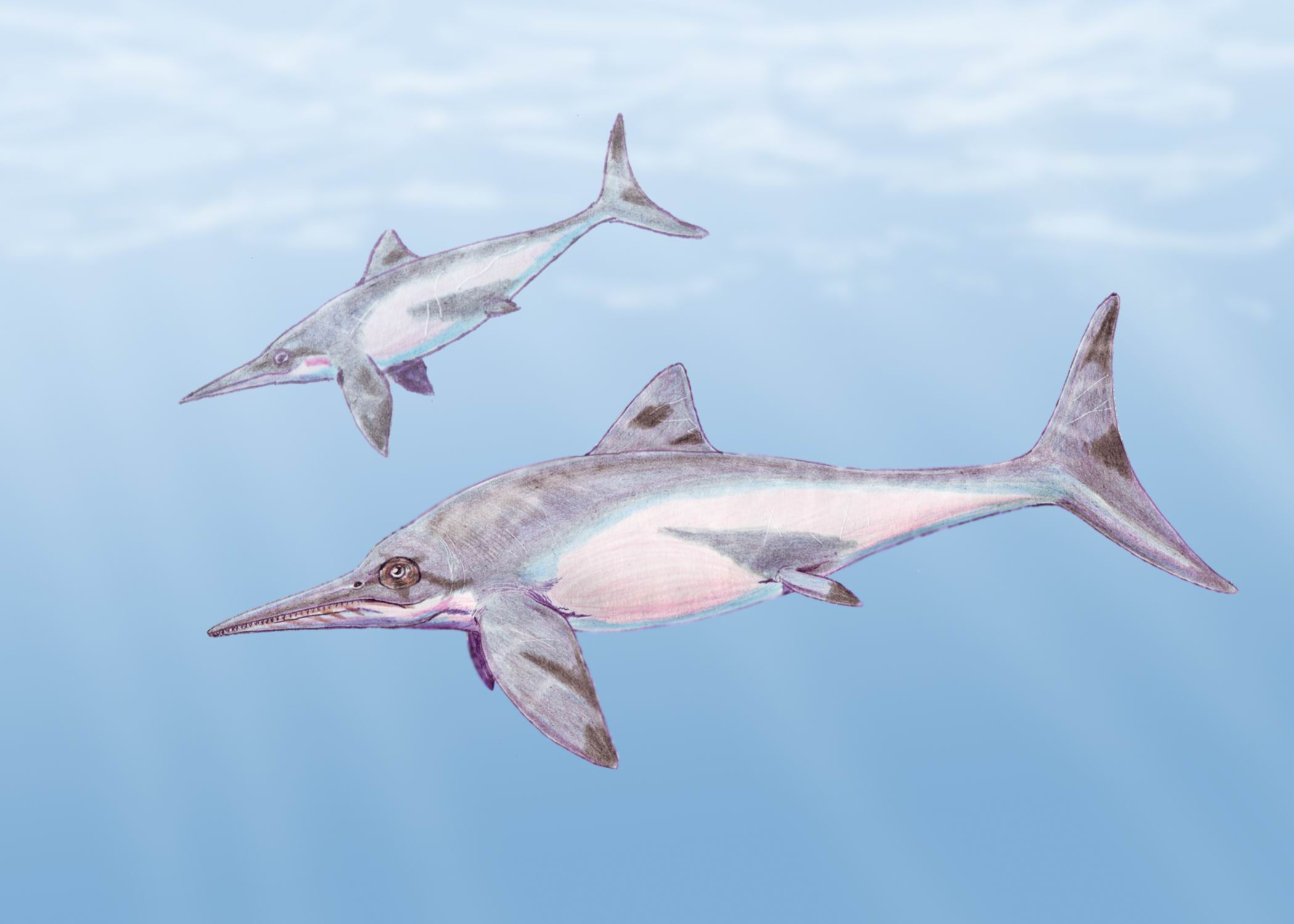
- Life restoration of the Early-Late Cretaceous ichthyosaur Platypterygius
  †Platypterygius
- †Plesiosaurus
- Pleurotomaria
- †Plicatoscyllium – type locality for genus
- Plicatula
- †Plioplatecarpus – tentative report
- Polinices
- †Pollex
- †Polyptychodon
- †Poposaurus
  - †Poposaurus gracilis
- †Porituberoolithus
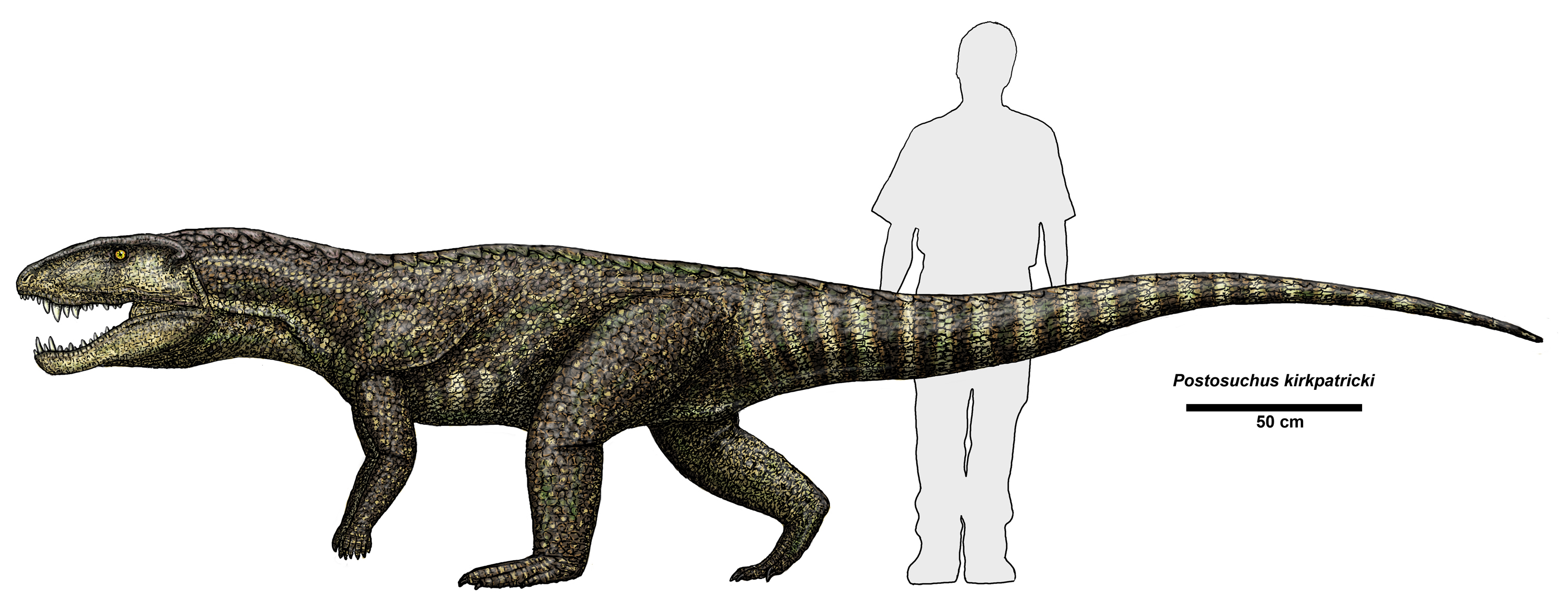
- Restoration of the Late Triassic crocodile relative Postosuchus with an anachronistic human to scale
  †Postosuchus – type locality for genus
  - †Postosuchus kirkpatricki – type locality for species
- †Procardia
- †Prognathodon – tentative report
- †Promystriosuchus – type locality for genus
- †Prosiren – type locality for genus
- †Protecovasaurus – type locality for genus
  - †Protecovasaurus lucasi – type locality for species
- †Protoavis – type locality for genus
  - †Protoavis texensis – type locality for species
- †Protocardia
- †Protohadros – type locality for genus
  - †Protohadros byrdi – type locality for species
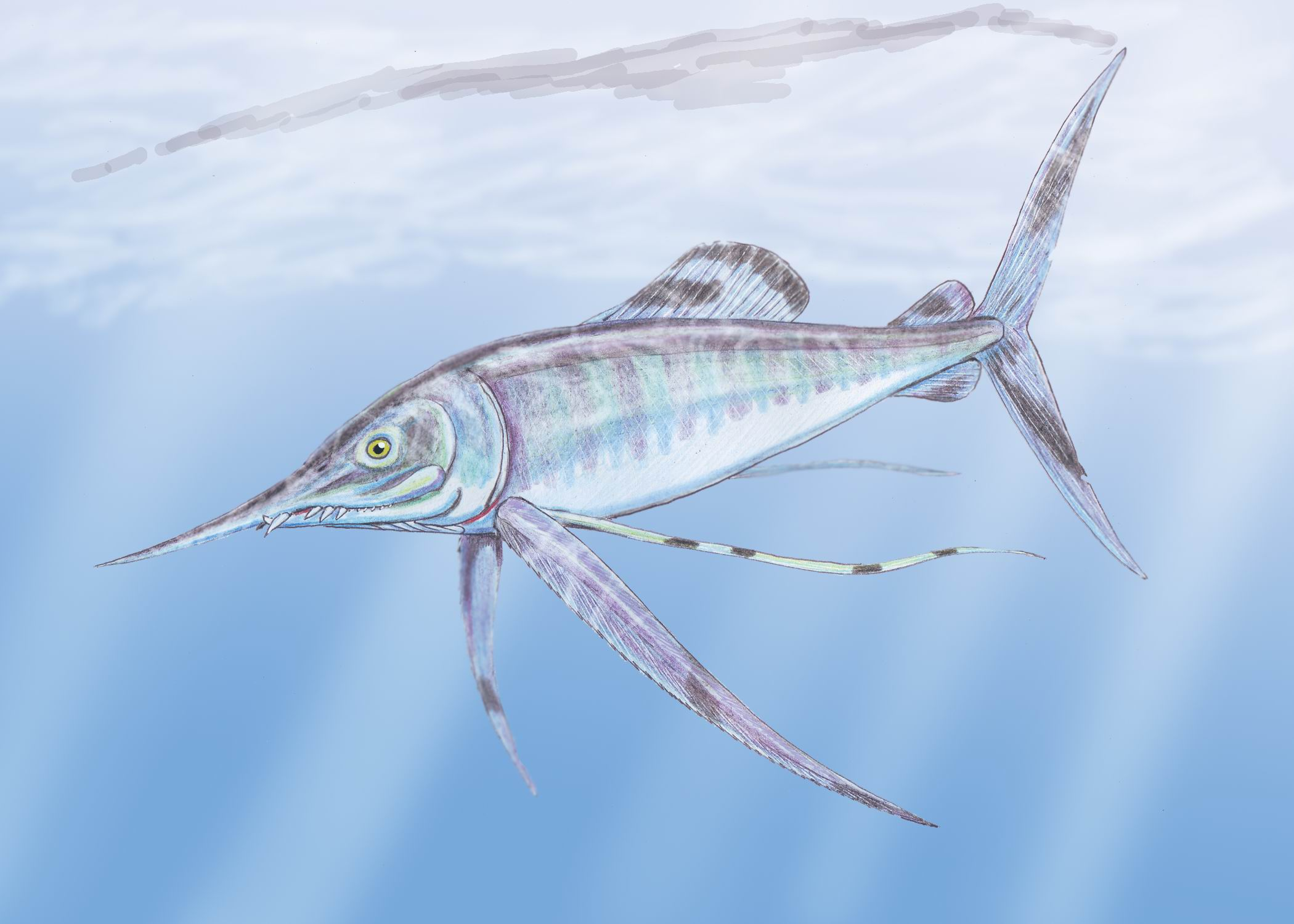
- Life restoration of the Late Cretaceous bony fish Protosphyraena
  †Protosphyraena
- †Pseudocorax
- †Pseudomelania
- †Pseudoperna
  - †Pseudoperna congesta
- †Pteranodon – or unidentified comparable form
- †Pteria
- †Pterotrigonia
  - †Pterotrigonia eufalensis
  - †Pterotrigonia eufaulensis
- †Ptychotrygon
- †Puzosia
- Pycnodonte
  - †Pycnodonte belli
  - †Pycnodonte mutabilis
  - †Pycnodonte vesicularis
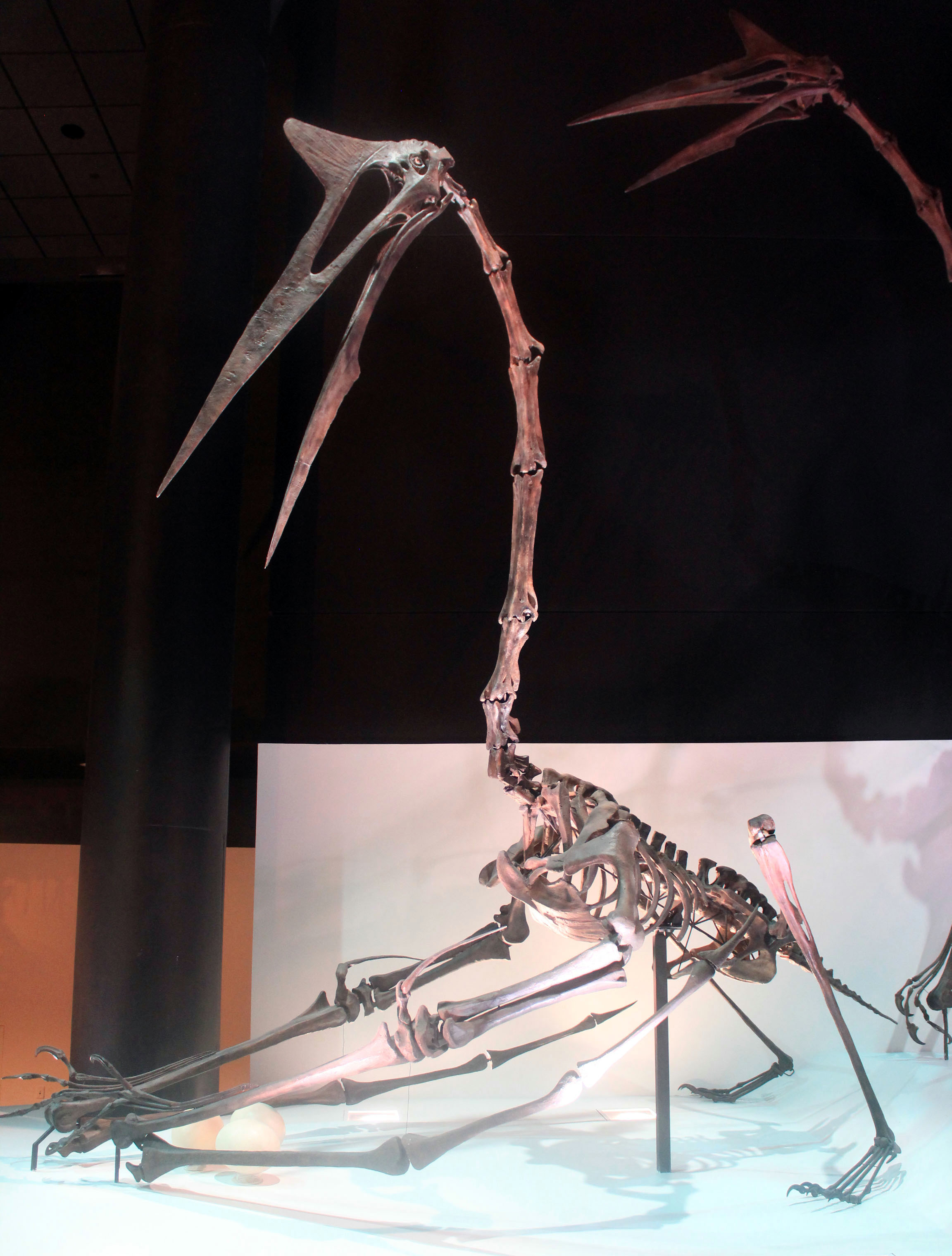
- Mounted fossilized skeleton of the Late Cretaceous pterosaur Quetzalcoatlus
  †Quetzalcoatlus – type locality for genus
  - †Quetzalcoatlus northropi – type locality for species
- †Quitmaniceras
- Raja
- †Rewaconodon – or unidentified related form
  - †Rewaconodon tikiensis
- Rhinobatos
- †Rhombodus
- †Richardoestesia
  - †Richardoestesia gilmorei
  - †Richardoestesia isosceles – type locality for species
- †Rileymillerus – type locality for genus
- Ringicula
  - †Ringicula pulchella
- Rogerella
- †Romaniceras
- Rostellaria – tentative report
- †Russellosaurus – type locality for genus
  - †Russellosaurus coheni – type locality for species
- †Rutiodon
- †Sargana
- Diagram illustrating the Early Cretaceous long-necked dinosaur Sauroposeidon with anachronistic humans to scale
  †Sauroposeidon
  - †Sauroposeidon proteles
- †Saurornitholestes
  - †Saurornitholestes langstoni – or unidentified comparable form
- †Sauvagesia – tentative report
- †Scapanorhynchus
  - †Scapanorhynchus texanus
- †Scapherpeton
- †Scaphites
  - †Scaphites hippocrepis - or unidentified loosely related form
  - †Scaphites warreni
- †Schizobasis
- Scintilla – tentative report
- †Sclerorhynchus
- Scyliorhinus
- †Selaginella – or unidentified comparable form
- †Seminola – tentative report
- †Semionotus – or unidentified comparable form
- †Senis
- Serpula
- †Serratolamna
  - †Serratolamna serrata
- †Sexta
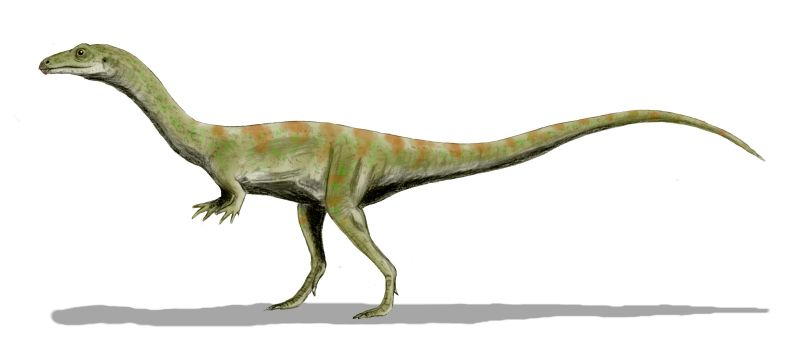
- Life restoration of the Late Triassic distant crocodilian relative Shuvosaurus
  †Shuvosaurus – type locality for genus
  - †Shuvosaurus inexpectatus – type locality for species
- †Siderastrea
- †Sierritasuchus – type locality for genus
  - †Sierritasuchus macalpini – type locality for species
- †Skolithos
- Solemya
- †Sphenodiscus
  - †Sphenodiscus lobatus
  - †Sphenodiscus pleurisepta
- †Spinosuchus – type locality for genus
  - †Spinosuchus caseanus – type locality for species
- †Spironema
- Spondylus
- Squalicorax
  - †Squalicorax kaupi
  - †Squalicorax pristodontus
- Squalus
- †Squatirhina
  - †Squatirhina americana
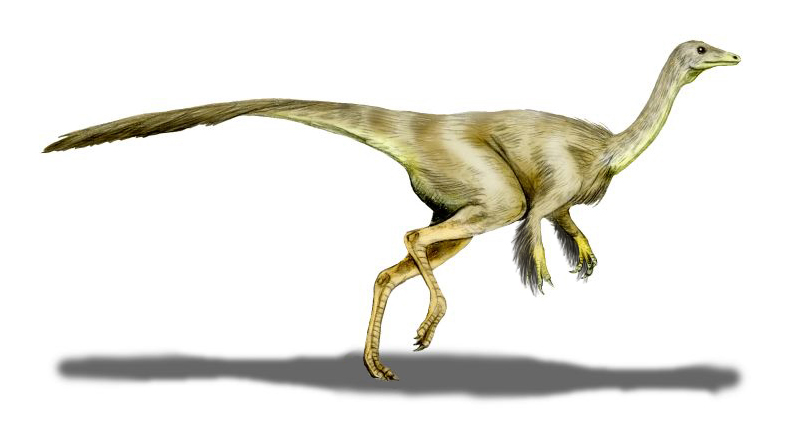
- Life restoration of the Late Cretaceous ostrich dinosaur Struthiomimus
  †Struthiomimus – or unidentified comparable form
- †Technosaurus – type locality for genus
  - †Technosaurus smalli – type locality for species
- †Tecovasaurus – type locality for genus
  - †Tecovasaurus murryi – type locality for species
- †Tecovasuchus – type locality for genus
  - †Tecovasuchus chatterjeei – type locality for species
- Teinostoma
- Tellina
- †Tenea
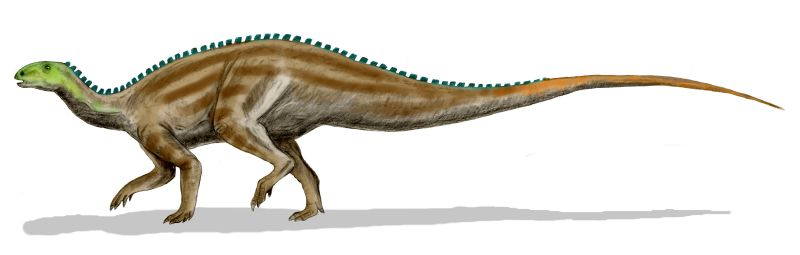
- Life restoration of the Early Cretaceous Iguanodon relative Tenontosaurus
  †Tenontosaurus
  - †Tenontosaurus dossi – type locality for species
- Teredolites
- †Terlinguachelys – type locality for genus
  - †Terlinguachelys fischbecki – type locality for species
- †Terminonaris
  - †Terminonaris robusta – or unidentified comparable form
- †Texacephale – type locality for genus
  - †Texacephale langstoni – type locality for species
- †Texasetes – type locality for genus
  - †Texasetes pleurohalio – type locality for species
- Textularia
- †Thamnasteria
- †Thamnoseris – tentative report
- †Thomasites
- Trachycardium
  - †Trachycardium eufaulensis
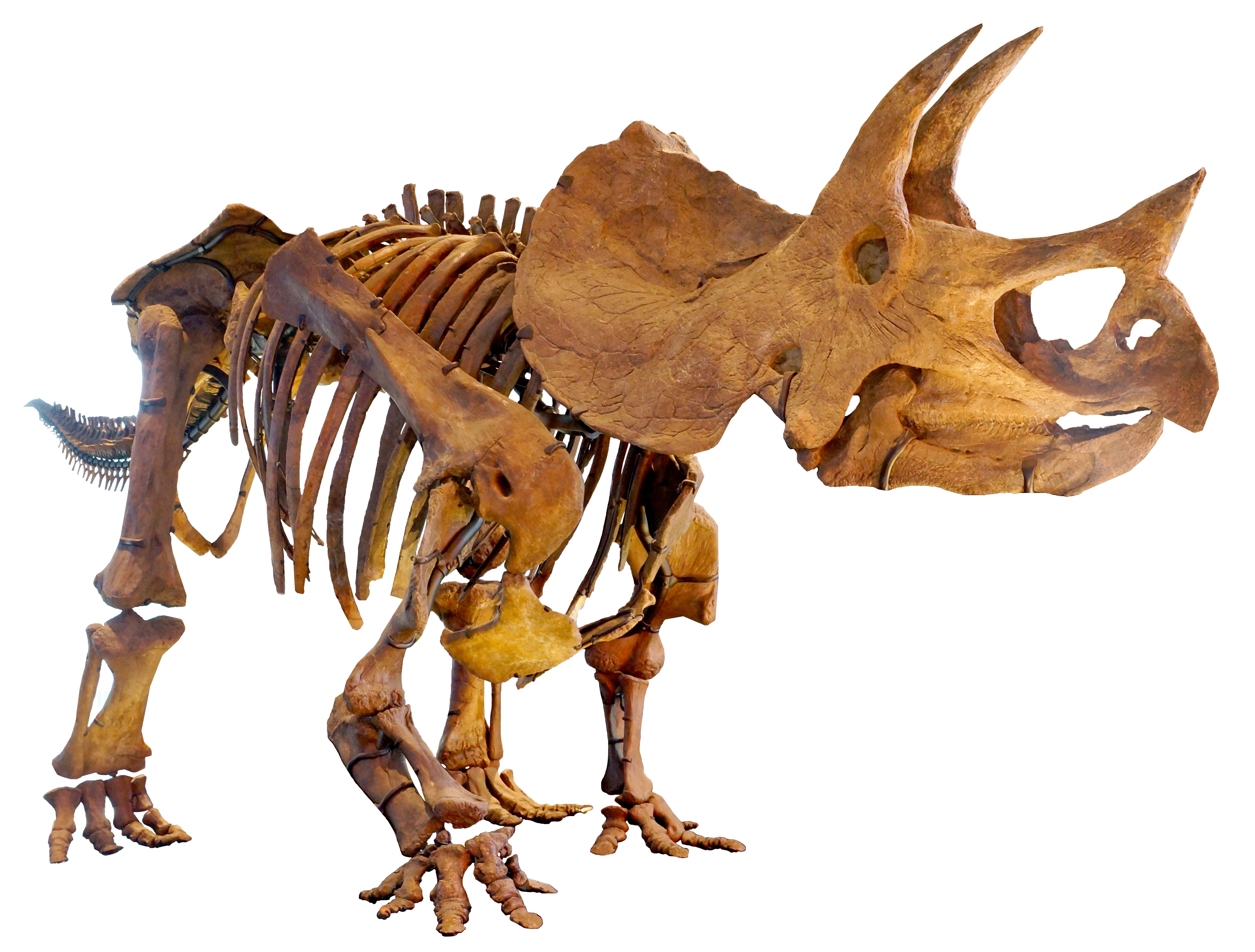
- Mounted fossilized skeleton of the Late Cretaceous horned dinosaur Triceratops
  †Triceratops
- †Trigonia
- †Trilophosaurus – type locality for genus
  - †Trilophosaurus buettneri – type locality for species
  - †Trilophosaurus jacobsi
- †Trinacromerum – type locality for genus
  - †Trinacromerum bentonianum – type locality for species
- †Triodus
- †Triopticus – type locality for genus
- †Trochactaeon
- Tryonia
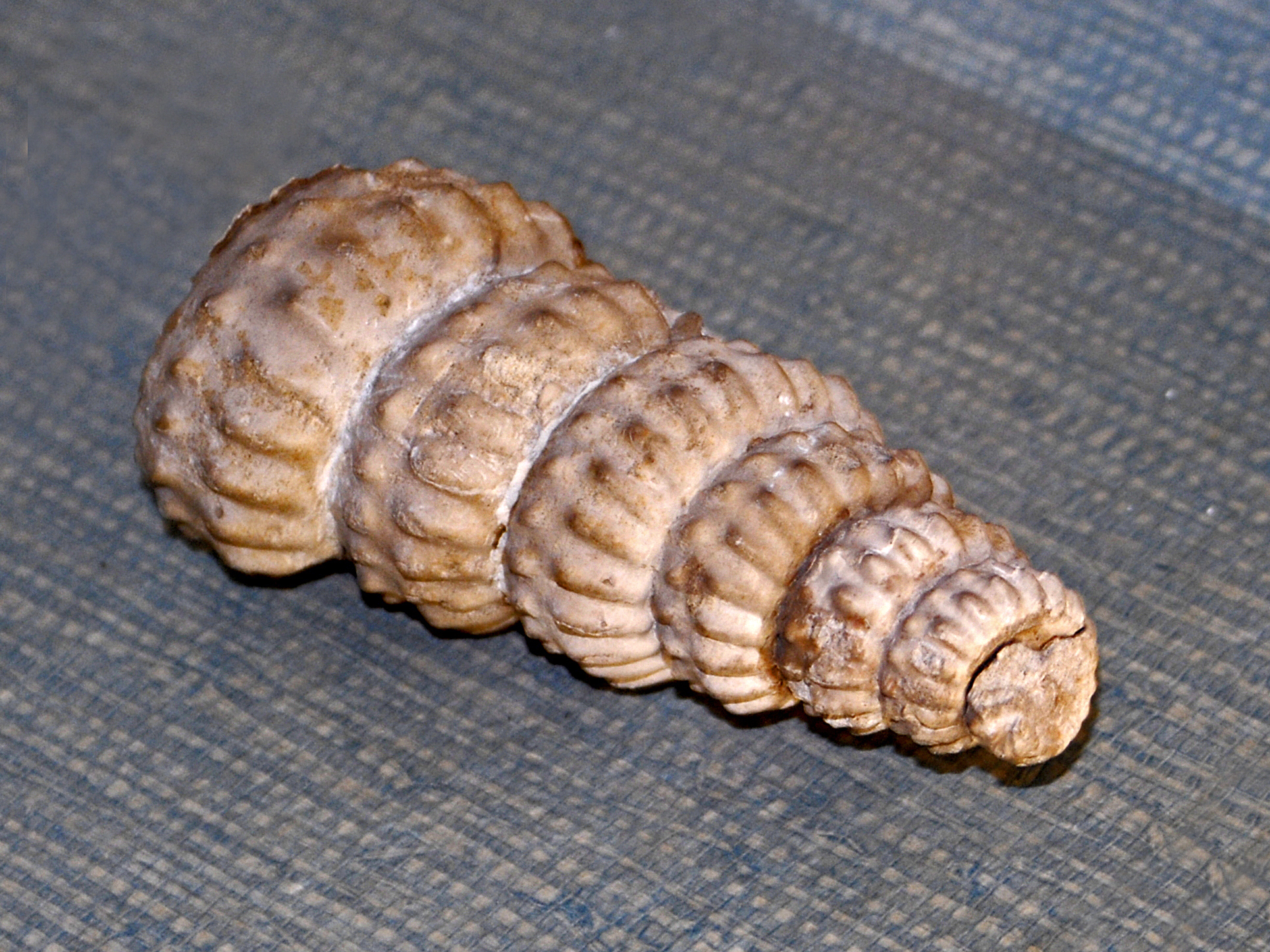
- Fossilized shell of the Late Cretaceous ammonoid cephalopod Turrilites
  †Turrilites
  - †Turrilites acutus
- Turritella
  - †Turritella bilira
  - †Turritella forgemoli – or unidentified comparable form
  - †Turritella hilgardi
  - †Turritella paravertebroides
  - †Turritella trilira
  - †Turritella vertebroides
- †Tylosaurus
  - †Tylosaurus kansasensis
  - †Tylosaurus nepaeolicus
  - †Tylosaurus proriger – or unidentified comparable form
- †Typothorax
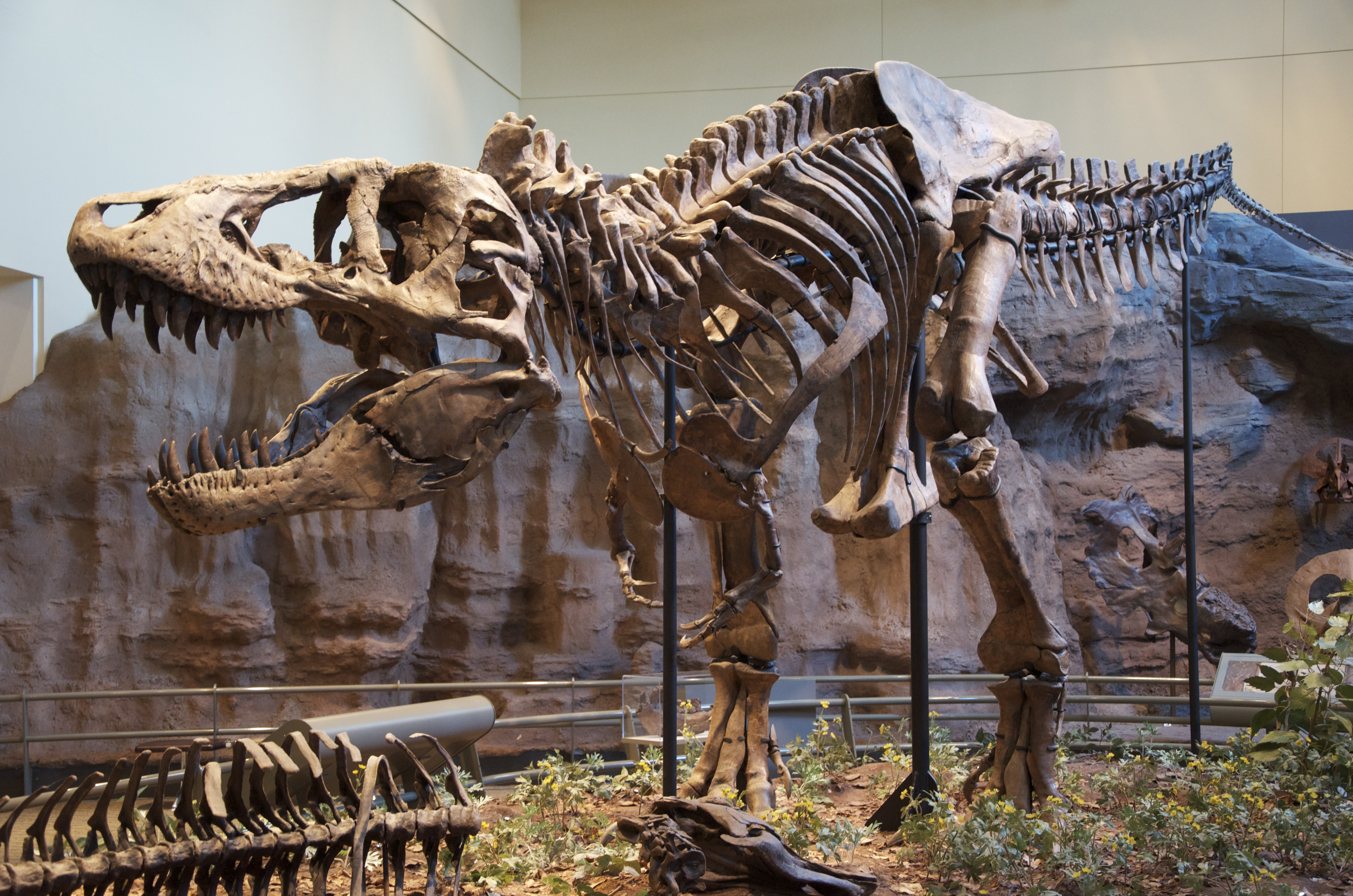
- Fossilized skeleton of the Late Cretaceous tyrannosaur Tyrannosaurus
  †Tyrannosaurus
  - †Tyrannosaurus rex
- †Uktenadactylus
- Unio
- †Upogebia
- †Vancleavea
  - †Vancleavea campi
- †Vascellum
- †Vascoceras
- Venericardia
- †Vinella
- Viviparus – tentative report
- Volsella
- Vulsella
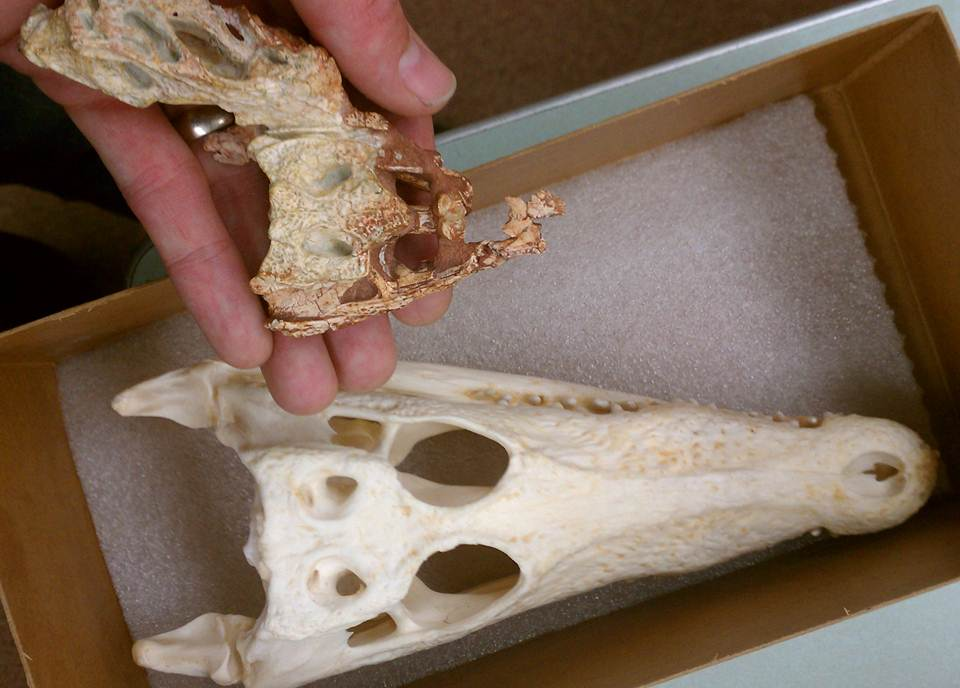
- Fossilized partial skulls of the Early Cretaceous crocodilian Wannchampsus
  †Wannchampsus – type locality for genus
- †Wannia
  - †Wannia scurriensis – type locality for species
- †Woodbinesuchus – type locality for genus
  - †Woodbinesuchus byersmauricei – type locality for species
- †Wrightoceras
- Xanthosia
- †Xenacanthus – report made of unidentified related form or using admittedly obsolete nomenclature
- Xenophora
- †Xiphactinus
- †Yezoites
- Yoldia

== Cenozoic ==
=== Selected Cenozoic taxa of Texas ===
- Abra
- Acanthocardia
- Acar
- Acirsa
- †Aclistomycter
- Acris
  - †Acris crepitans
- Acteocina
- Acteon
- Admetula
- Adrana
- Aedes
- †Aelurodon
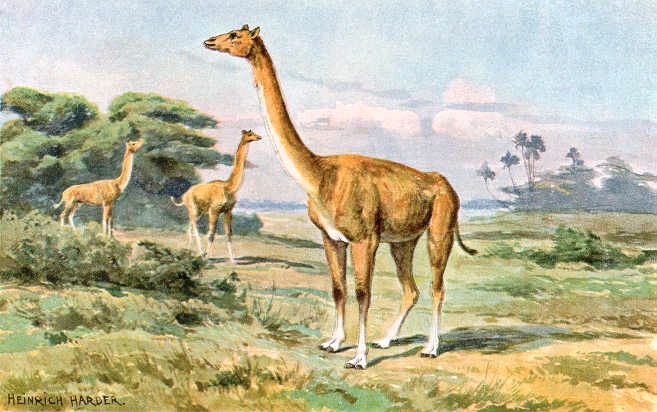
- Life restoration of the Miocene camel Aepycamelus, or the long-necked camel. Heinrich Harder (1920).
  †Aepycamelus
- Agaronia
- Agkistrodon
- †Agriocharis
- †Agriochoerus
- †Agriotherium
- †Aguascalientia
- Akera
- †Alforjas
- Aliculastrum
- †Allaeochelys – or unidentified comparable form
- Alligator
  - †Alligator mississipiensis
  - †Alligator mississippiensis
  - †Alligator olseni
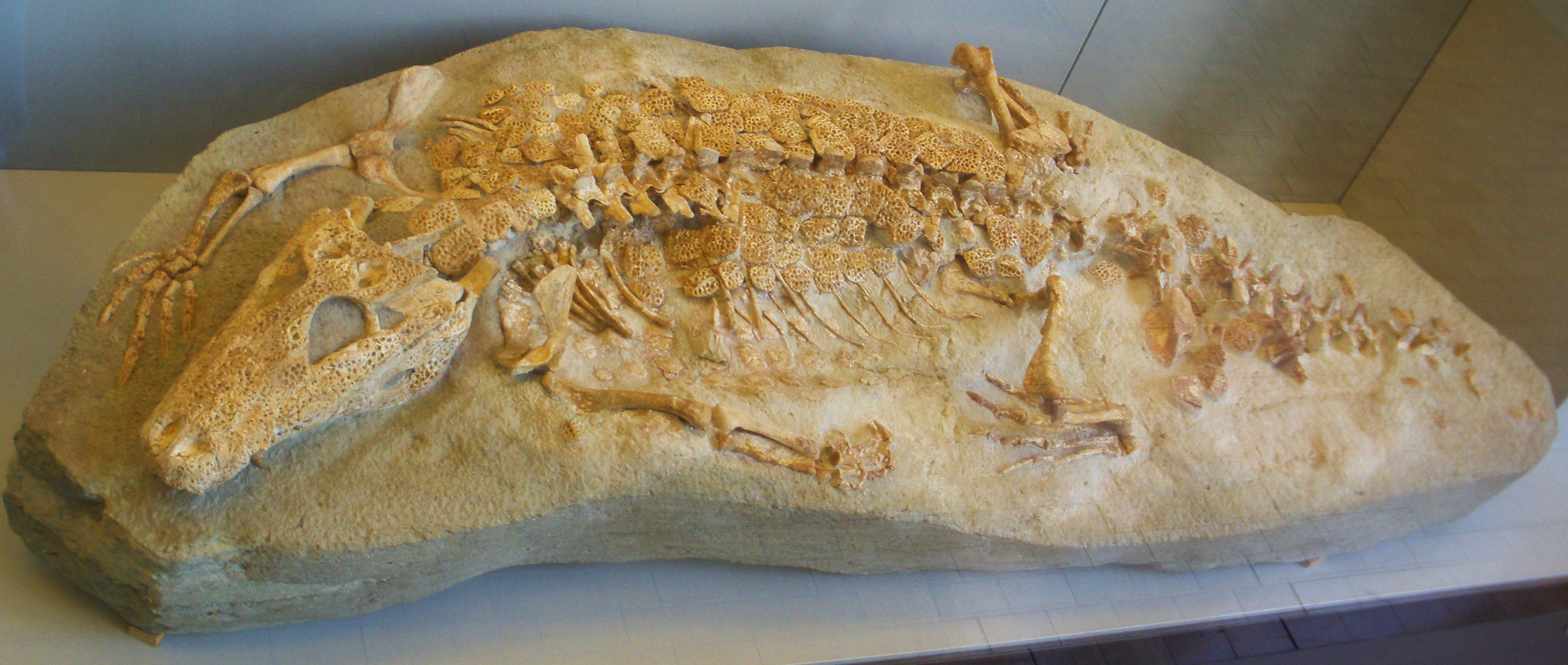
- Fossilized skeleton of the Late Cretaceous-Oligocene Alligator relative Allognathosuchus
  †Allognathosuchus
- †Allomorone
- Alvania
- †Amblema
  - †Amblema plicata
- †Ambystoma
  - †Ambystoma tigrinum
- †Amebelodon
- †Ameiurus
- Amnicola
- †Amphicyon
- †Amphimachairodus
- Amphiuma
- †Ampullina
- Amusium
- Anadara
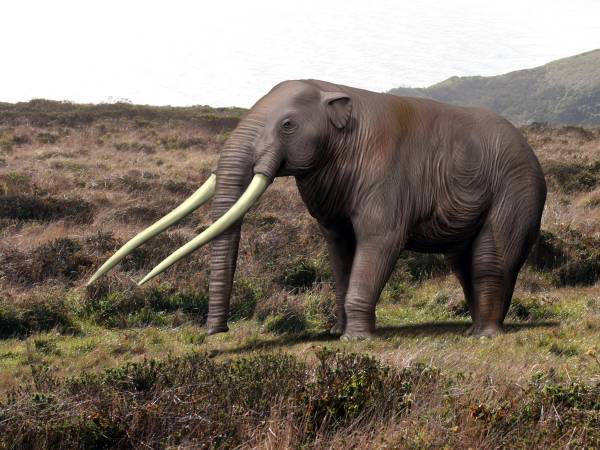
- Life restoration of the Miocene-Pleistocene elephant relative Anancus
  †Anancus
- †Anchitheriomys
- †Anchitherium
- Ancilla
- †Angelarctocyon
  - †Angelarctocyon australis – type locality for species
- †Annona
- Anodontia
- Anomia
- Antalis
- Anthonomus – tentative report
- Antillophos
- Antrozous
  - †Antrozous pallidus
- †Aphelops
- †Aplexia
- Aplodinotus
  - †Aplodinotus grunniens
- Aquila
  - †Aquila chrysaetos
- Arca
- †Archaeohippus
- †Archaeotherium
- Architectonica
- †Arctocyon
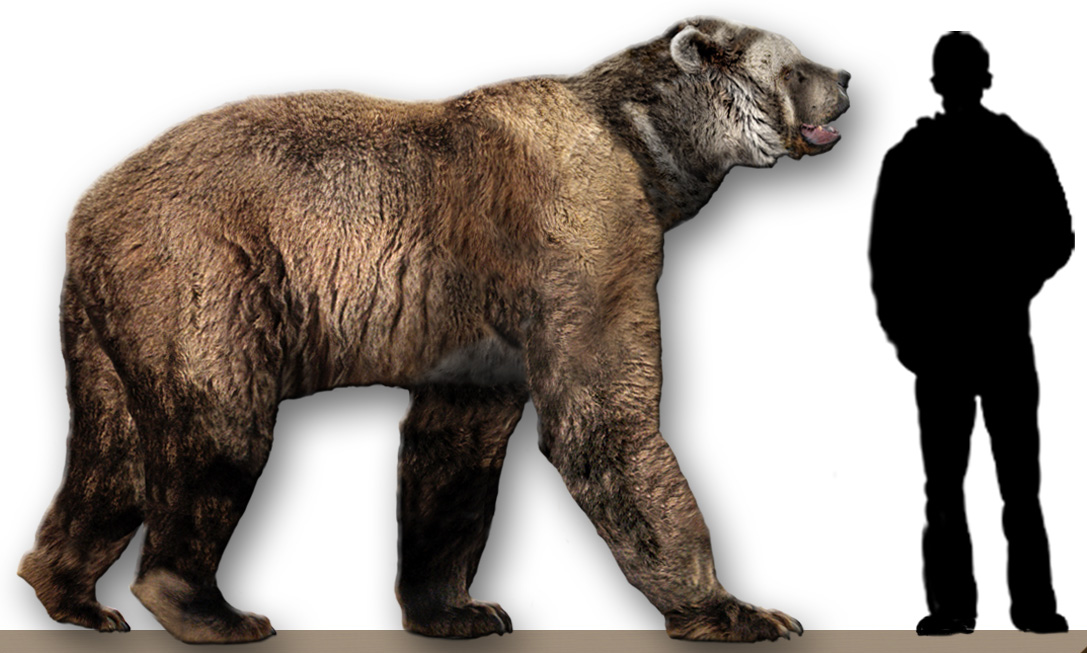
- Restoration of an Arctodus, or short-faced bear, with a human to scale
  †Arctodus
  - †Arctodus simus
- †Arctonasua
- Argobuccinum
- Argyrotheca
- Arius – or unidentified comparable form
- Arizona
  - †Arizona elegans
- †Artocarpus
- Astarte
- Asthenotoma
- †Astrohippus
- Athleta
- Atlanta
- Atractosteus
  - †Atractosteus spatula
  - †Atractosteus tristoechus – tentative report
- Atrina
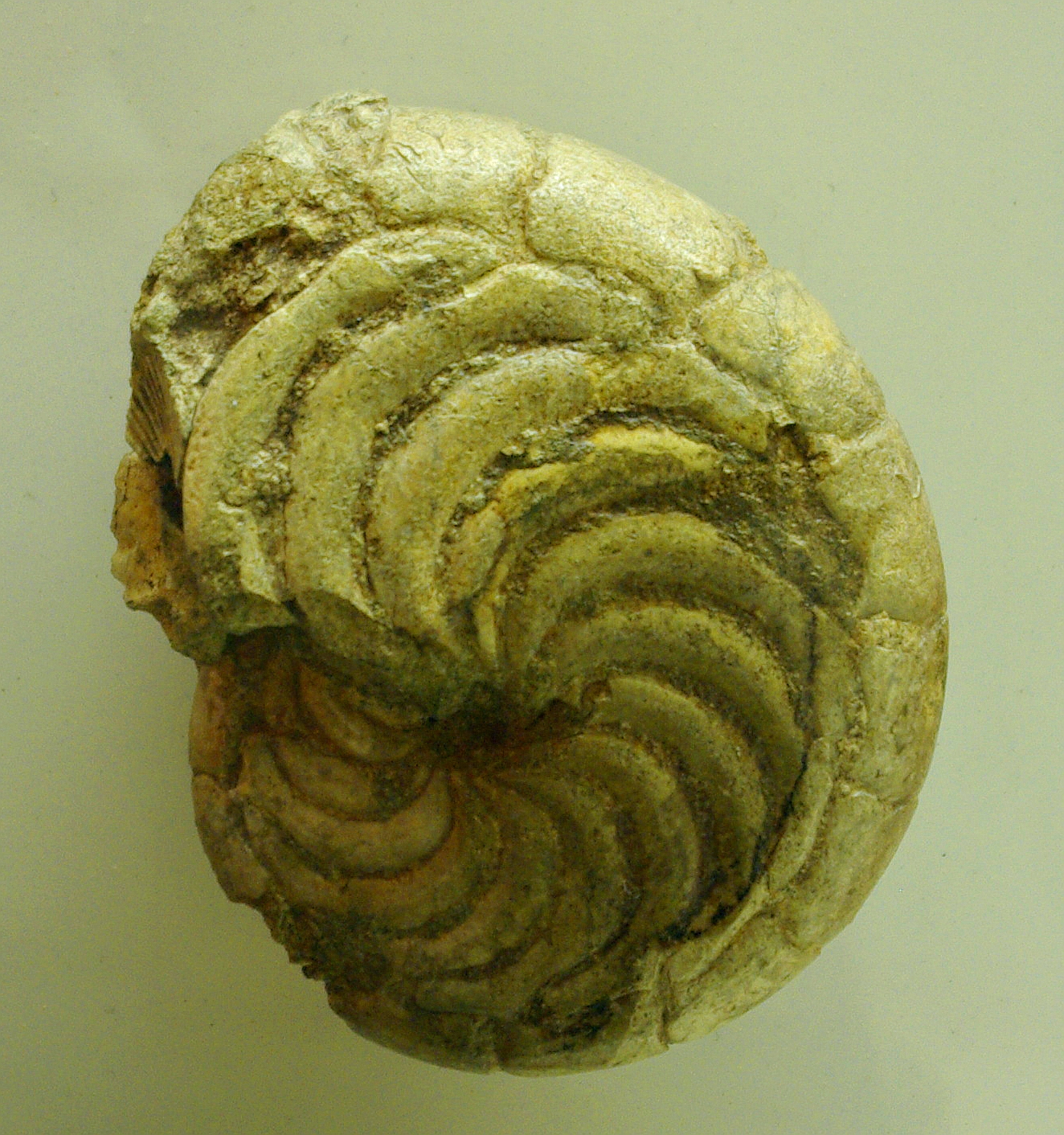
- Fossilized shell of the Paleocene-Miocene nautiloid cephalopod Aturia
  †Aturia
- Atys
- †Australocamelus
- †Awateria
- Baiomys
- †Baiotomeus
  - †Baiotomeus douglassi
- Balanophyllia
- Balanus
- †Baluchicardia
- Bankia
- Barbatia
- †Barbourofelis
  - †Barbourofelis whitfordi
- Bassariscus
- †Bathygenys
- Bathytoma
  - †Bathytoma nonplicata – or unidentified comparable form
- †Batrachosauroides
- Bela – report made of unidentified related form or using admittedly obsolete nomenclature
- †Belosaepia
- †Belosepia
- Bison
  - †Bison antiquus
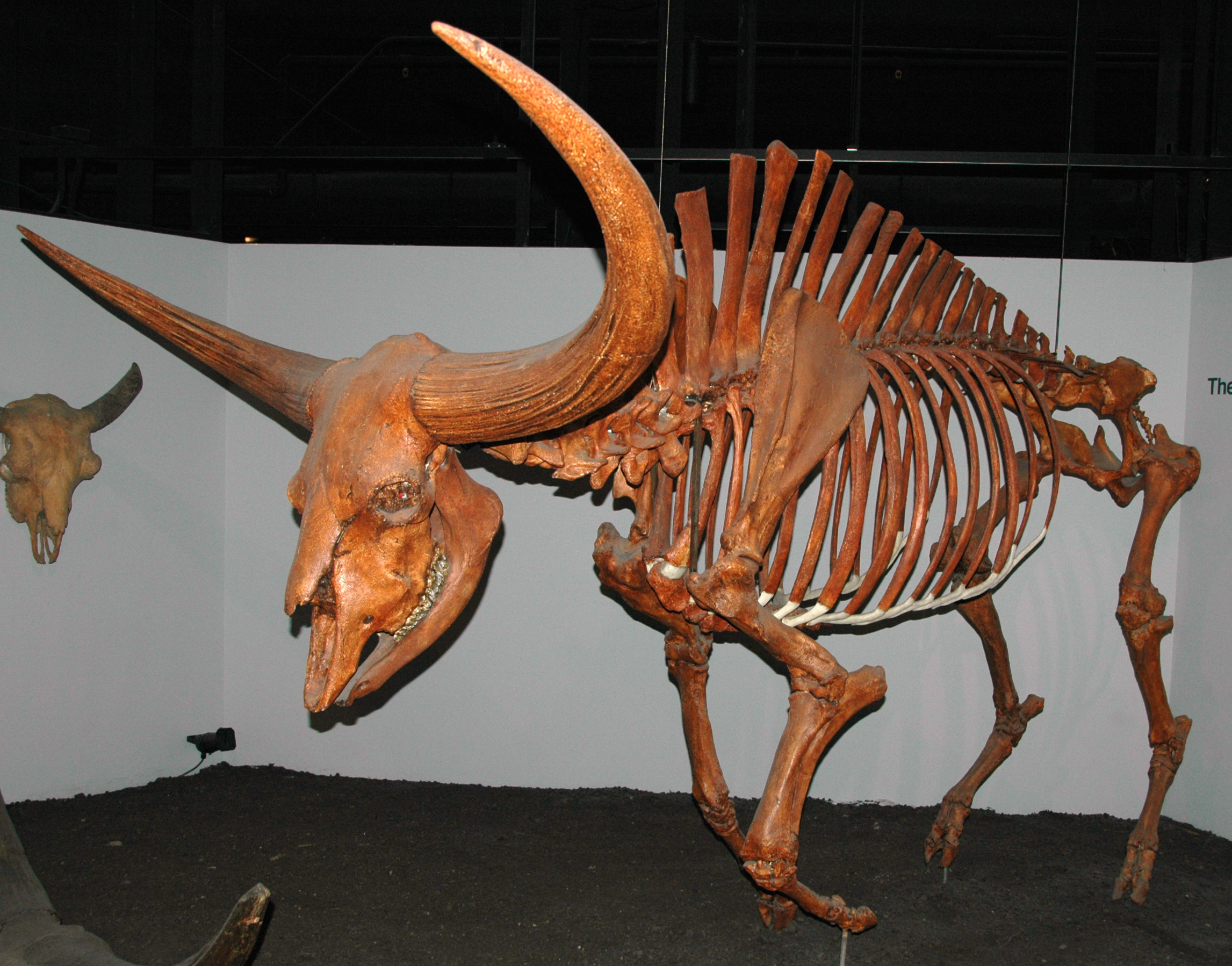
  - Mounted fossilized skeleton of the Pleistocene Bison latifrons, or long-horned bison
    †Bison latifrons
- Bittiolum – report made of unidentified related form or using admittedly obsolete nomenclature
- Bittium
- †Blancocamelus
- Blarina
  - †Blarina brevicauda – or unidentified comparable form
- †Blastomeryx
- †Boavus – tentative report
- †Bonellitia
- †Borealosuchus
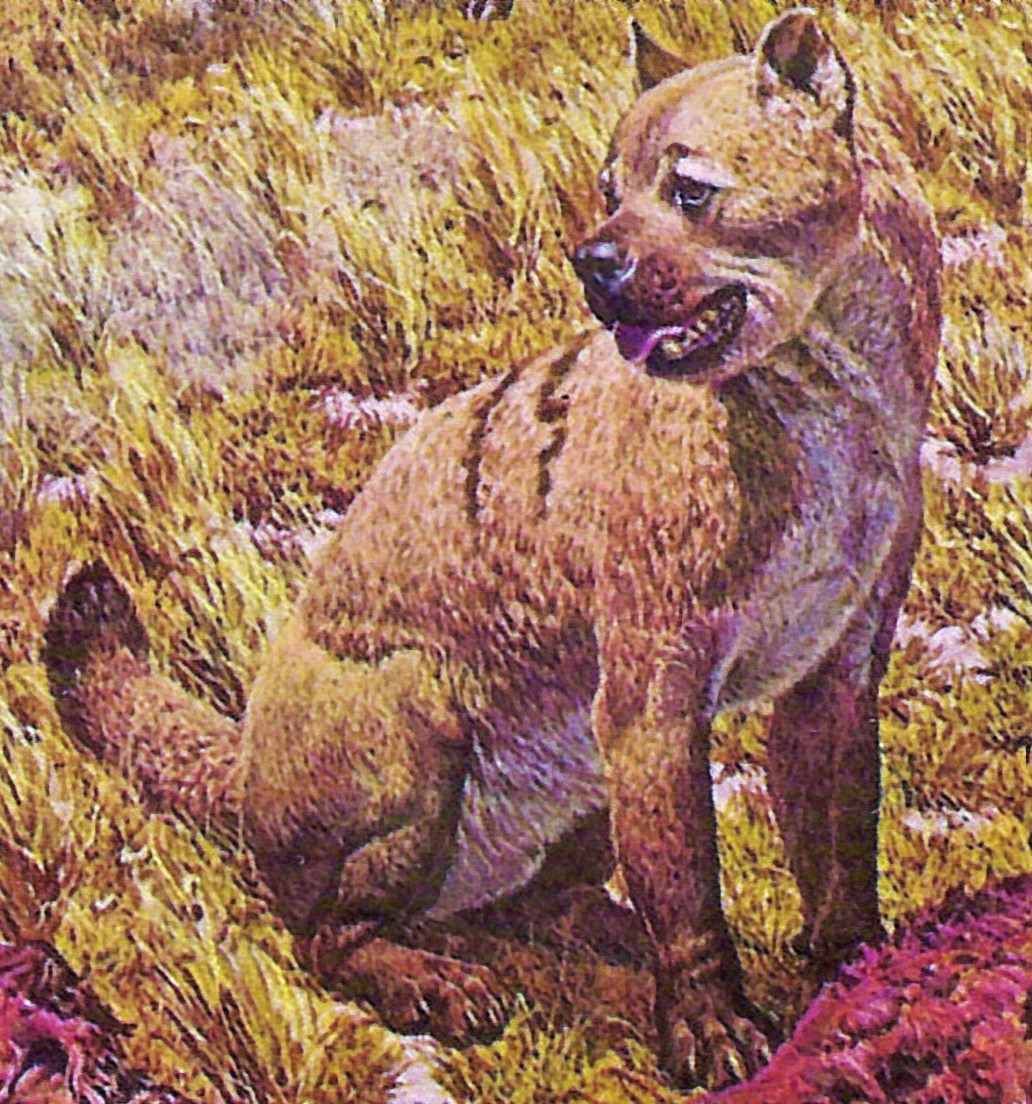
- Restoration of two of the Miocene-Pliocene bone-crushing dog genus Borophagus preying on a camel. Jay Matternes (1964).
  †Borophagus
  - †Borophagus diversidens
  - †Borophagus hilli – type locality for species
  - †Borophagus pugnator – or unidentified comparable form
  - †Borophagus secundus
- †Boverisuchus
  - †Boverisuchus vorax – or unidentified comparable form
- Brachidontes
- †Brachyhyops
- †Brachyrhynchocyon
- Bregmaceros
- †Bryozoan
- Bufo
  - †Bufo cognatus
  - †Bufo woodhousei
- Bulimulus
  - †Bulimulus dealbatus
- Bullia
- Cadulus
- Caecum – or unidentified comparable form
- Caestocorbula
- †Calappilia
- †Calippus
- Callianassa
- Calyptraea
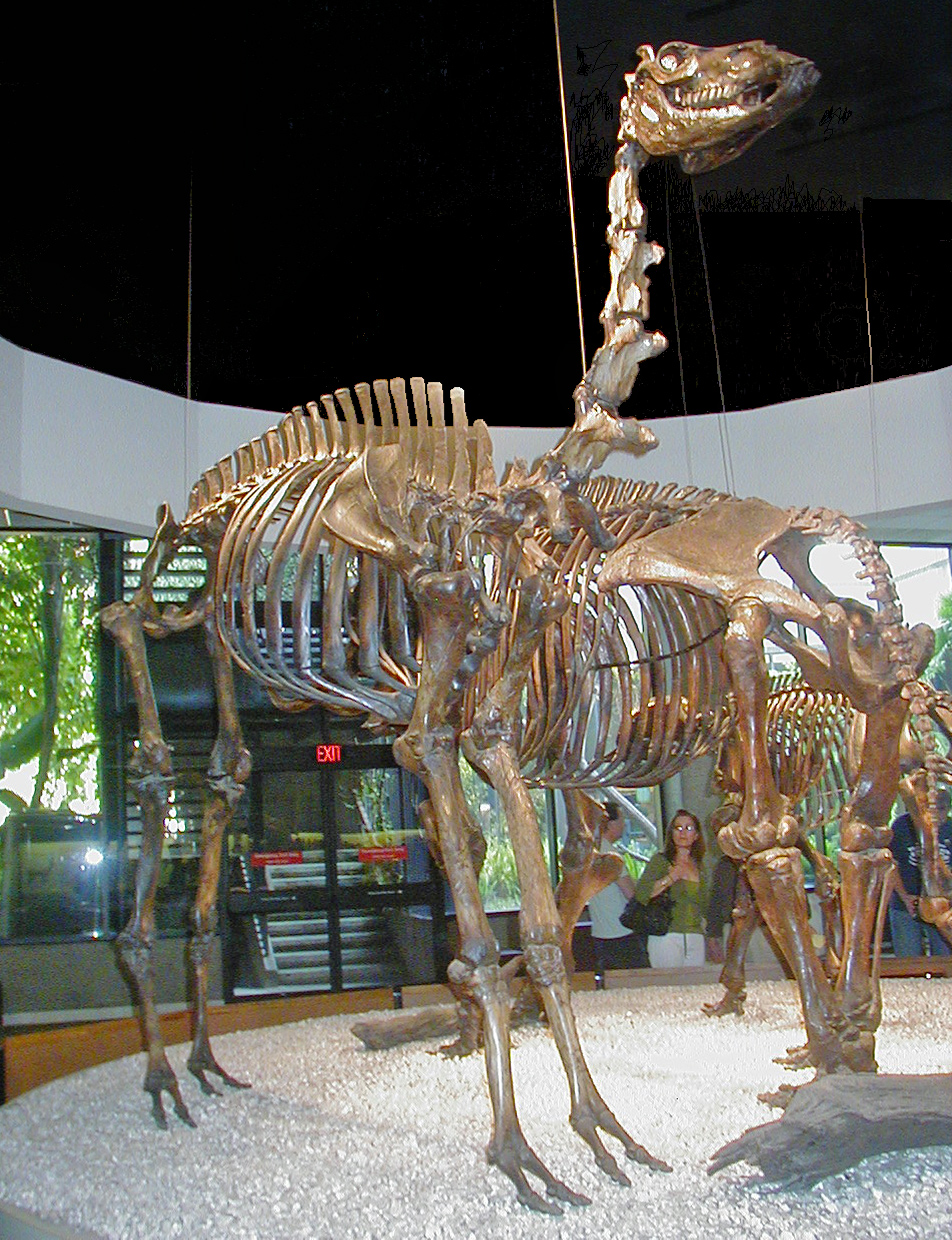
- Mounted fossilized skeleton of the Pliocene-Holocene camel Camelops
  †Camelops
  - †Camelops hesternus – type locality for species
  - †Camelops minidokae
- Cancellaria
- Candona
- Canis
  - †Canis armbrusteri
  - †Canis dirus
  - †Canis edwardii
  - †Canis latrans
  - †Canis lepophagus – type locality for species
- Cantharus
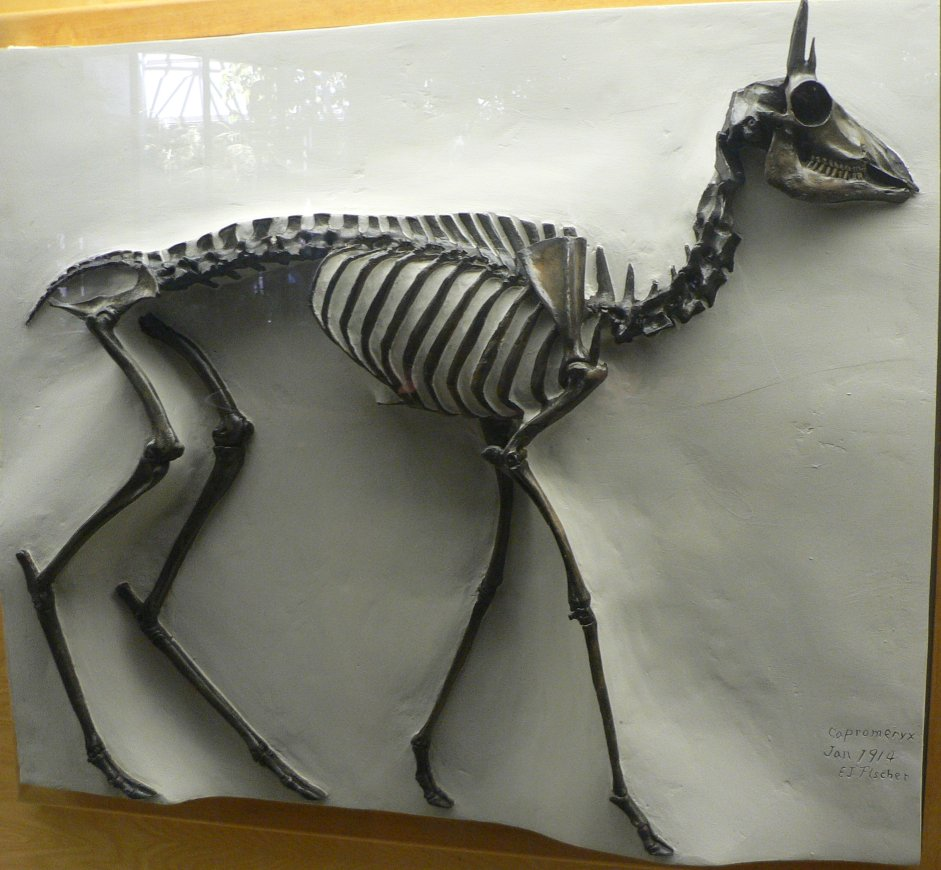
- Fossilized skeleton of the Pleistocene dwarf pronghorn Capromeryx
  †Capromeryx
- Capulus
- Carapus
- Carcharhinus
- †Carpocyon
- Carychium
  - †Carychium exiguum
- Caryophyllia
- Castor
  - †Castor canadensis
- Catagonus
- †Caveola
- Celtis
- Centropomus – tentative report
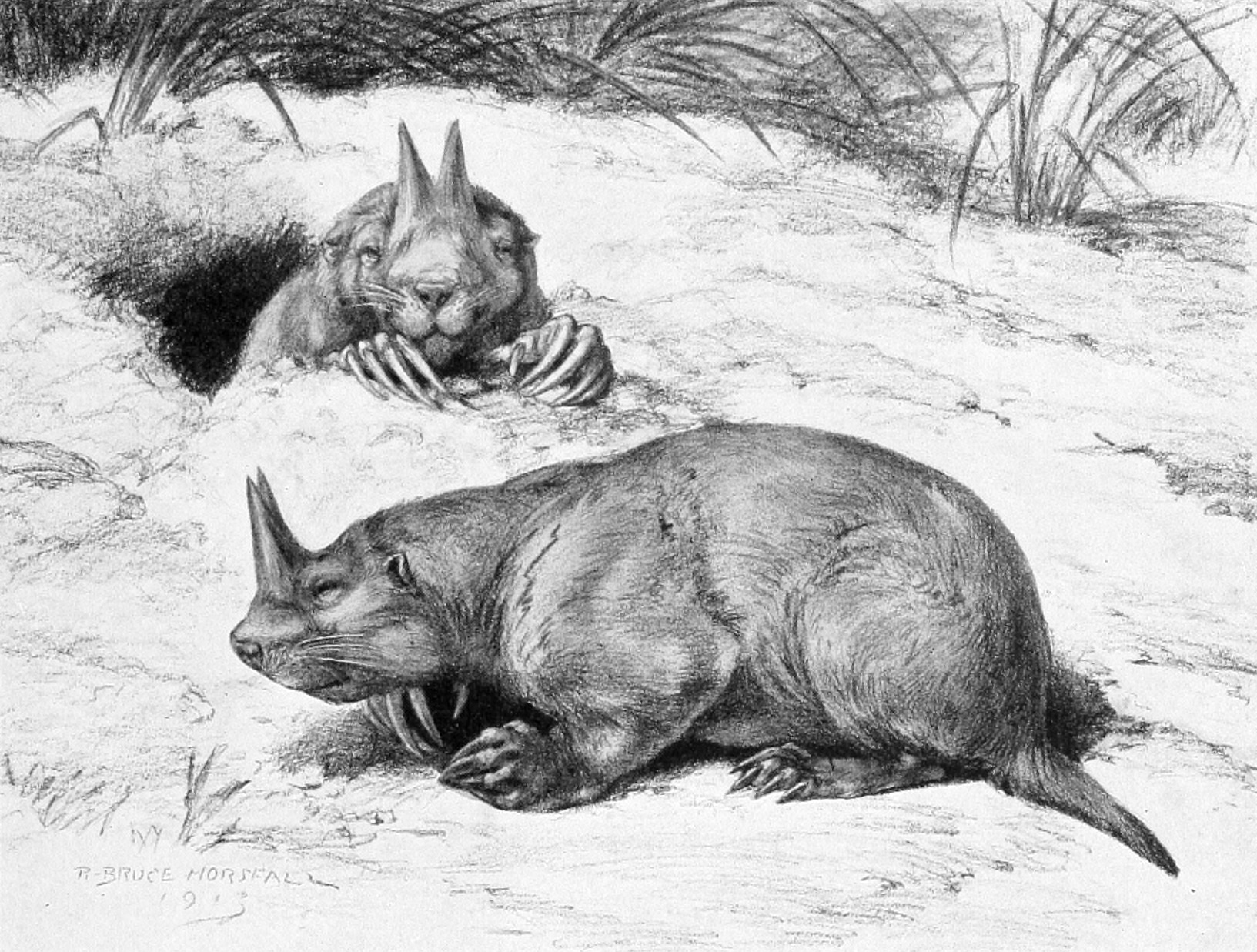
- Life restoration of the Miocene-Pleistocene horned gopher Ceratogaulus. Robert Bruce Horsfall (1913).
  †Ceratogaulus
  - †Ceratogaulus anecdotus – or unidentified comparable form
- †Cerdocyon
- Cerithiella
- Cerithiopsis
- Cerithium – tentative report
- Chaetodipus
  - †Chaetodipus hispidus
- Chama
- Charina
- †Charophyte
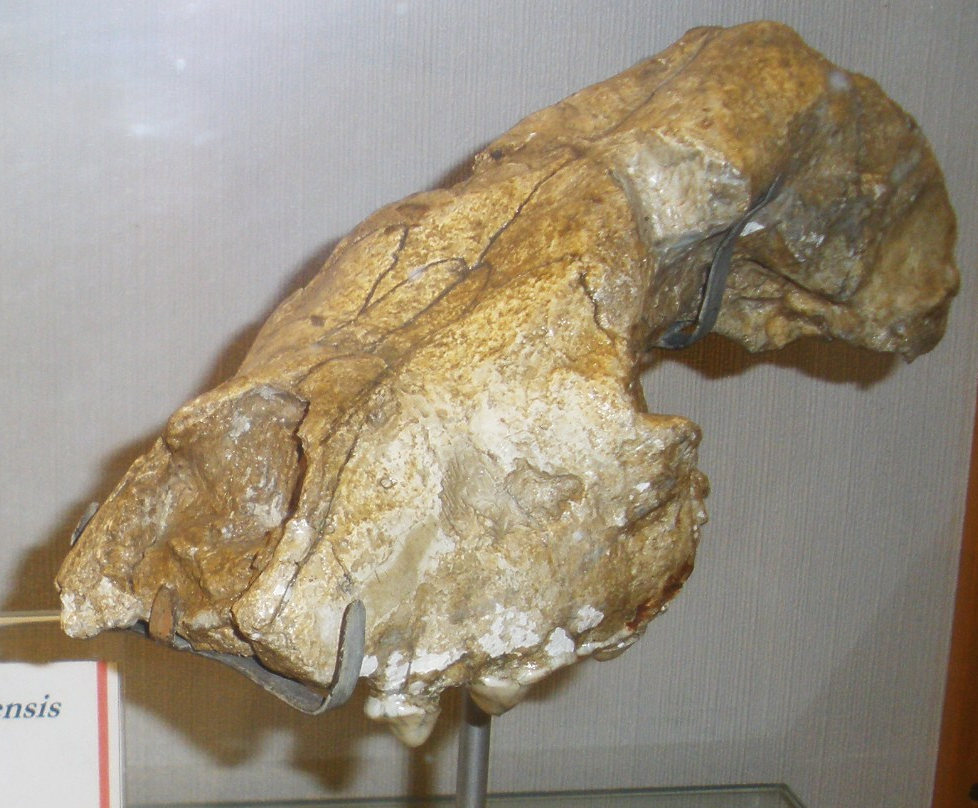
- Fossilized cranium of the Pliocene-Pleistocene hyena Chasmaporthetes
  †Chasmaporthetes
- Chironomus
- Chlamys
- †Chriacus
- †Cimolodon
- Cirsotrema
- Cissus
- Clavilithes
- Clavus – tentative report
- Closia
- Clypeaster
- Cochlespira
- Cochliolepis
- †Colodon
- Coluber
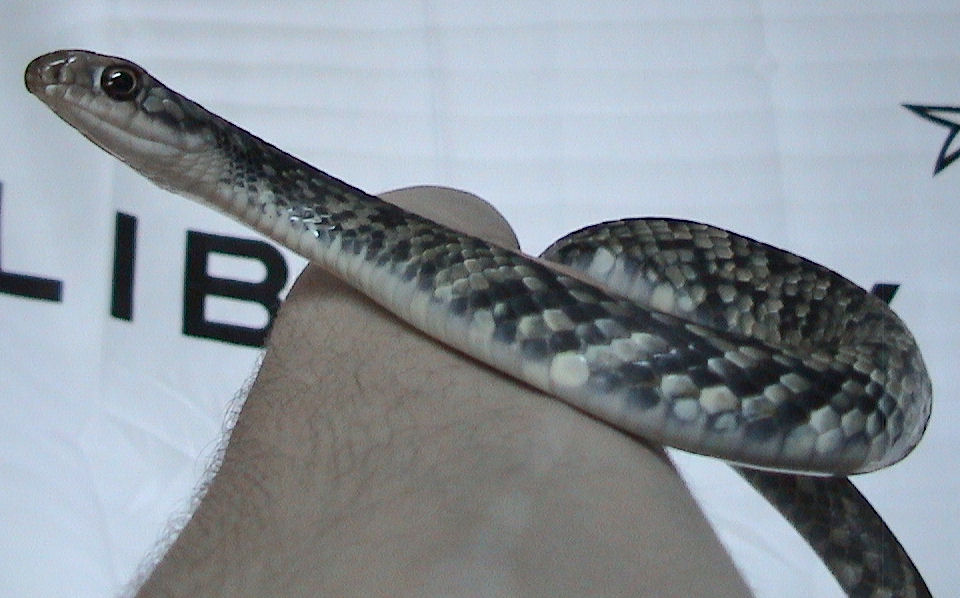
  - A living Coluber constrictor, or eastern racer
    †Coluber constrictor
- Colubraria
- Columbella – report made of unidentified related form or using admittedly obsolete nomenclature
- †Colwellia
- †Combretum
- Cominella – or unidentified comparable form
- Conomitra
- Conus
- Corbicula
- Corbula
- †Cormohipparion
- †Corvina
- Corvus
  - †Corvus brachyrhynchos
- †Coryphodon
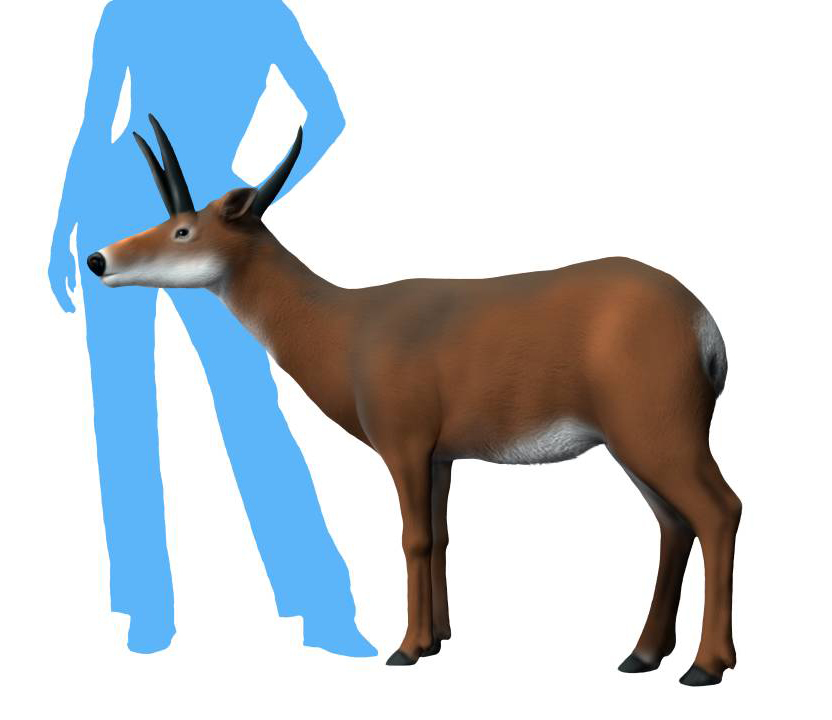
- Restoration of the Miocene palaeomerycid Cranioceras, a relative of modern deer, with anachronistic human to scale
  †Cranioceras
- Crassostrea
  - †Crassostrea contracta
- Cratogeomys
  - †Cratogeomys castanops
- Crenella
- †Cristellaria
- Crotalus
  - †Crotalus atrox
  - †Crotalus horridus
- Crotaphytus
  - †Crotaphytus collaris
  - †Crotaphytus reticulatus
- Cryptotis
  - †Cryptotis parva
- Cucullaea
- Culex
- Cuna
- Cuspidaria
  - †Cuspidaria grandis
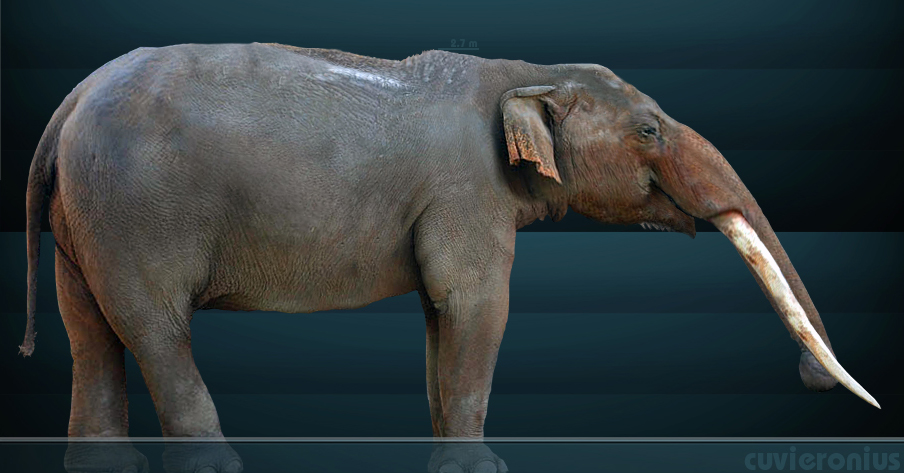
- Life restoration of the Pliocene-Holocene elephant relative Cuvieronius
  †Cuvieronius
- Cyclammina
- Cylichna
- †Cylindracanthus
- Cyllene – or unidentified comparable form
- †Cynarctoides
- †Cynarctus
- Cynomys
  - †Cynomys ludovicianus
- Cypraea
- Cypraedia
- Cythara
- †Daphoenictis
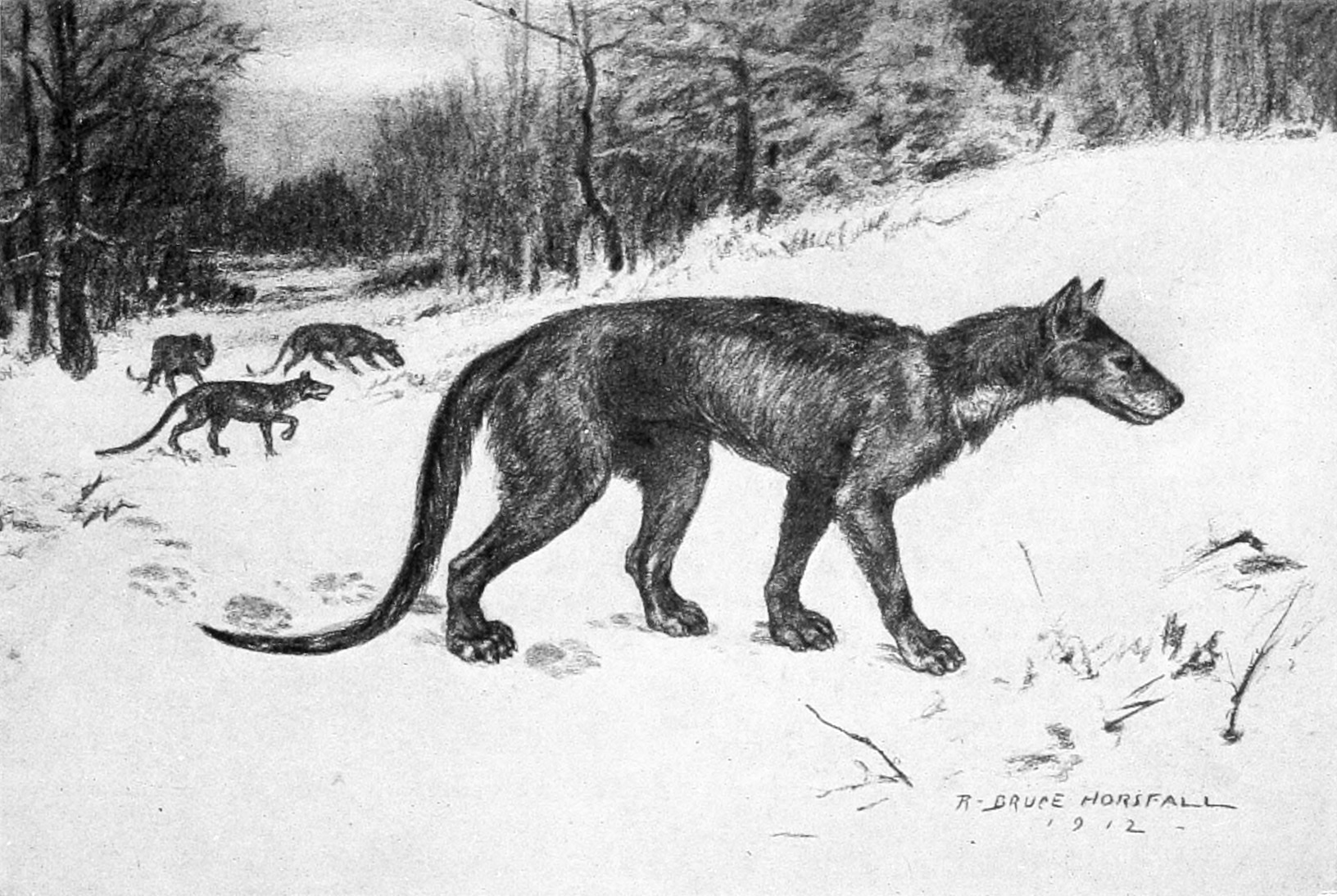
- Life restoration of the Miocene bear-dog Daphoenodon
  †Daphoenodon
- †Daphoenus
  - †Daphoenus lambei – or unidentified comparable form
- Dasyatis
- Dasypus
  - †Dasypus bellus
- Dentalium
- Dermatemys
- †Desmatippus
- †Diaphyodus
- †Dibelodon
- †Diceratherium
- Didelphis
  - †Didelphis marsupialis
- †Dinofelis
- †Dinohippus
- †Dinohyus
  - †Dinohyus hollandi
- Diplotaxis – or unidentified comparable form
- Dipodomys
  - †Dipodomys merriami
  - †Dipodomys ordii
  - †Dipodomys spectabilis
- †Discradisca
- Disonycha
- †Dolicholatirus
- Dorsanum
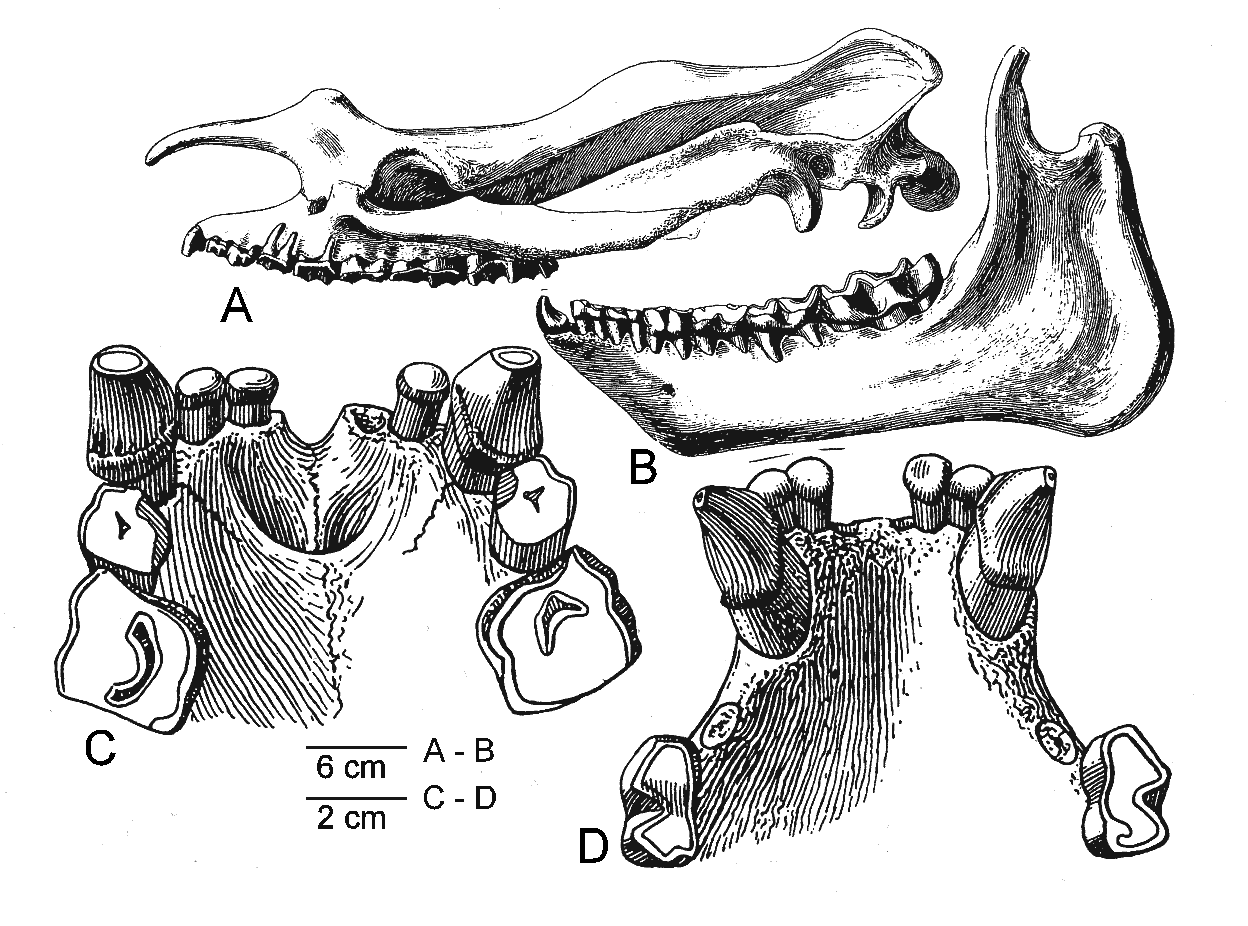
- Illustration of the fossilized jaws and teeth of the Eocene brontothere mammal Duchesneodus
  †Duchesneodus
- †Echmatemys
- Elaphe
  - †Elaphe guttata
  - †Elaphe obsoleta
- Eleutherodactylus
  - †Eleutherodactylus augusti
- †Ellisella
- Emarginula – or unidentified comparable form
- Endochironomus
- †Eomellivora
- †Eosurcula
- Epicauta
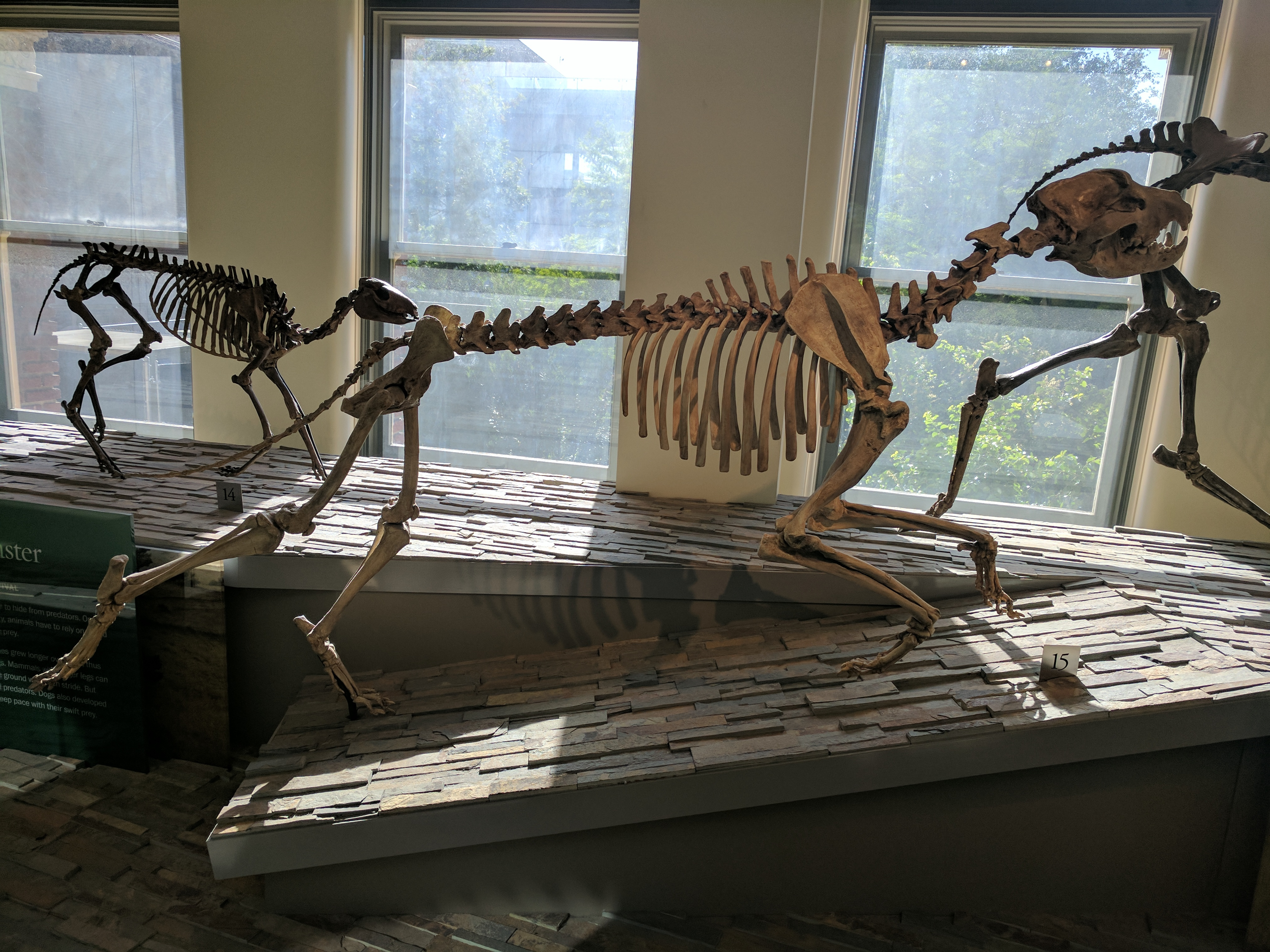
- Mounted fossilized skeleton of the Miocene bone-crushing dog Epicyon
  †Epicyon
  - †Epicyon haydeni
- †Epihippus
- Epitonium
- Eptesicus
  - †Eptesicus fuscus
- Equus
  - †Equus alaskae – or unidentified comparable form
  - †Equus conversidens
  - †Equus francisci – type locality for species
  - †Equus giganteus
  - †Equus idahoensis
  - †Equus scotti – type locality for species
  - †Equus semiplicatus
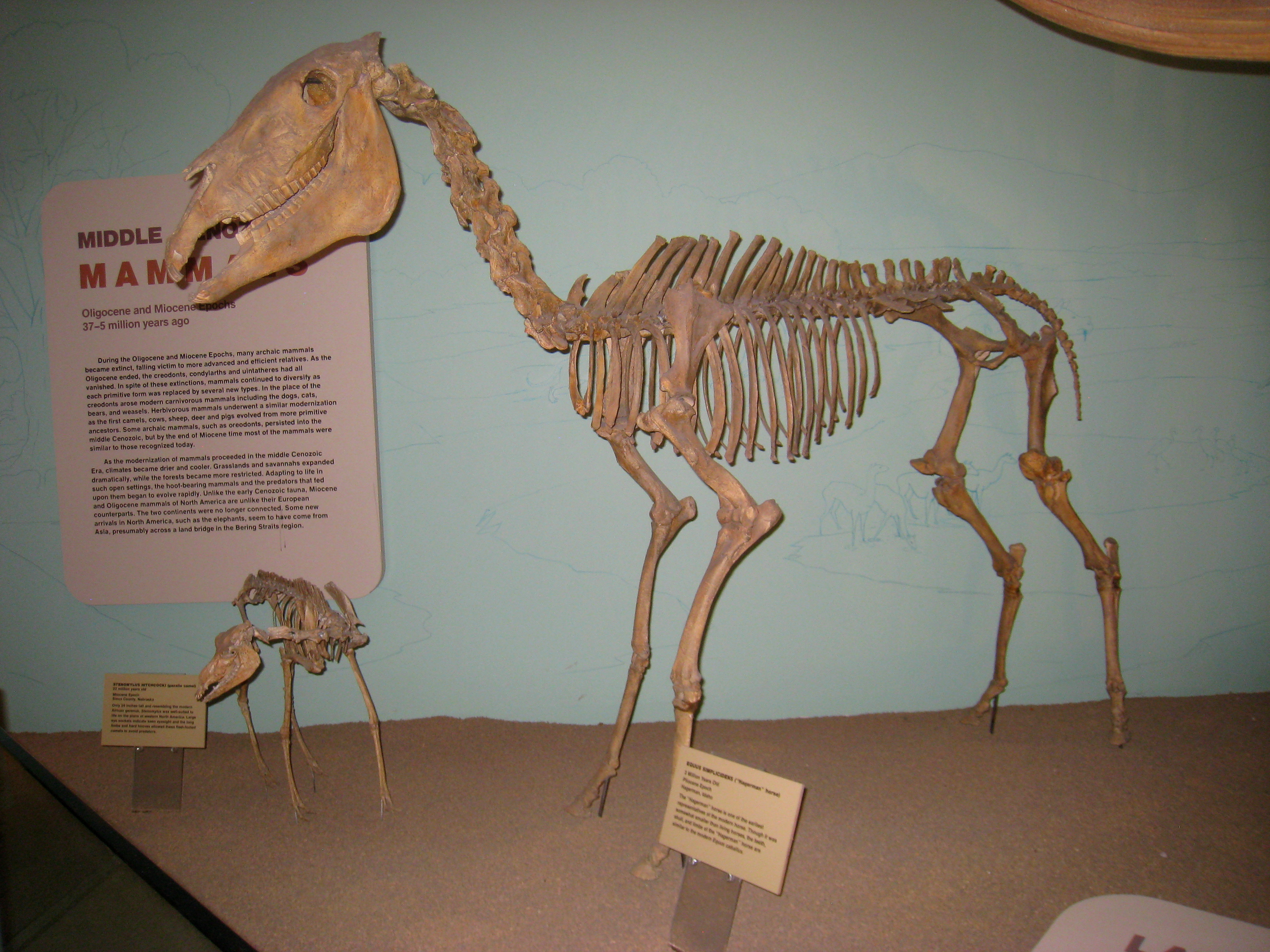
  - Fossilized skeleton of the Pliocene-Pleistocene horse Equus simplicidens, also known as the Hagerman horse or American zebra
    †Equus simplicidens
  - †Equus occidentalis
- Erethizon
  - †Erethizon dorsatum
- †Eucyon
  - †Eucyon davisi
- Eulima
- Eumeces
  - †Eumeces fasciatus
  - †Eumeces obsoletus
- †Euonymus
- Eupleura
- Euspira
- †Eutrephoceras
- †Exilia
- Fasciolaria – tentative report
- Felis
- †Ficopsis
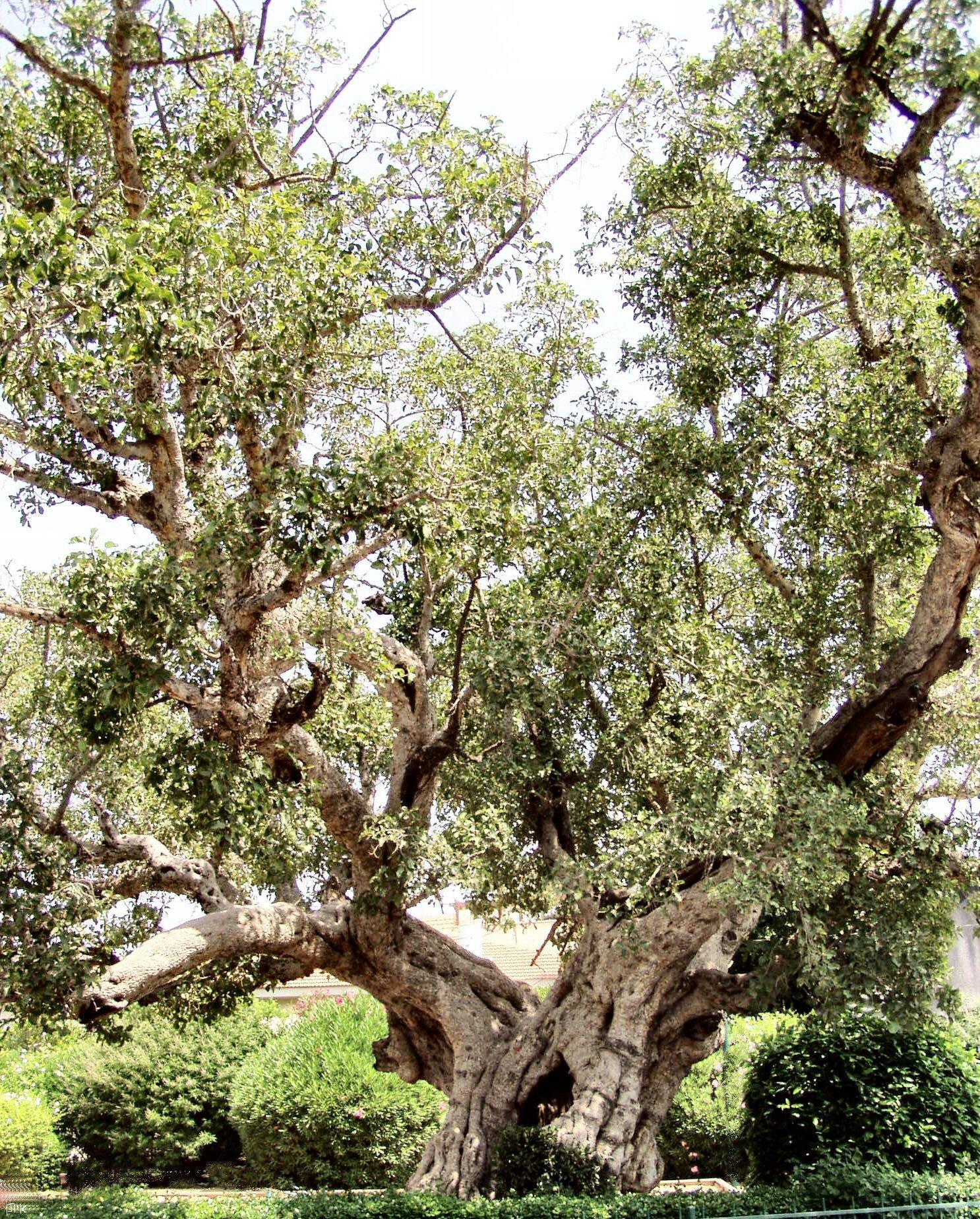
- A living Ficus, or fig tree
  Ficus
- Flabellum
- †Floridachoerus – tentative report
- †Floridatragulus
- Formica
- Fossaria
- Fulgurofusus
- †Fusconaia
- Fusinus
- Fustiaria
- Gadila
- Galeocerdo
- Galeodea
- Gastrocopta
  - †Gastrocopta armifera
  - †Gastrocopta contracta
  - †Gastrocopta pellucida
  - †Gastrocopta pentodon
- †Gavialosuchus
- Gegania
- Geochelone
- Geomys
  - †Geomys bursarius
- †Gigantocamelus
- †Glossotherium
- Glycymeris
- Glyptoactis
- †Glyptotherium
  - †Glyptotherium texanum
- Glyptozaria
- †Gnathabelodon
- †Gomphotherium
- †Goniobasis
- Gopherus – type locality for genus
  - †Gopherus polyphemus – type locality for species
- Graptemys
  - †Graptemys geographica
- Gregariella
- †Gulfoceras
- †Gustafsonia
- Guttulina
- Gyraulus
  - †Gyraulus parvus
- †Hadrianus
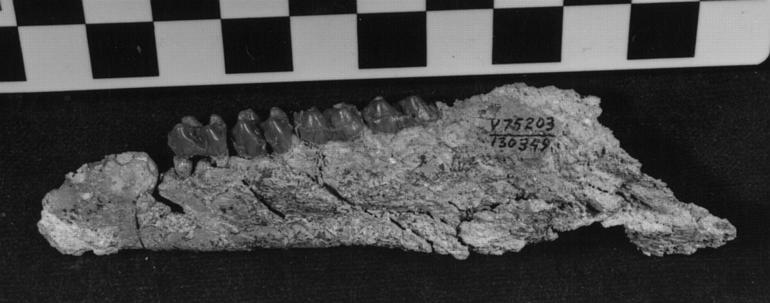
- Fossilized mandible of the Eocene horse Haplohippus
  †Haplohippus
- Harpa
- †Harpactocarcinus
- †Harpagolestes
- Hastula
- Haustator
- Hawaiia
  - †Hawaiia minuscula
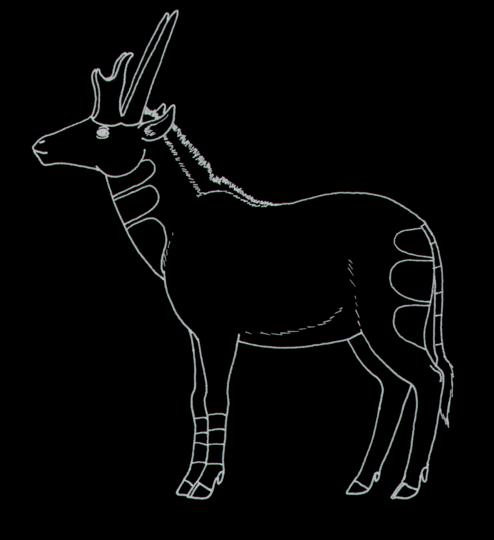
- Life restoration of the Pleistocene pronghorn Hayoceros
  †Hayoceros
- Helicina
  - †Helicina orbiculata
- Helicodiscus
  - †Helicodiscus parallelus
- Helisoma
  - †Helisoma anceps
  - †Helisoma trivolvis
- Heloderma
- †Hemiauchenia
  - †Hemiauchenia macrocephala
- †Herpetotherium
- †Hesperotestudo
- †Heteraletes
- Heterodon
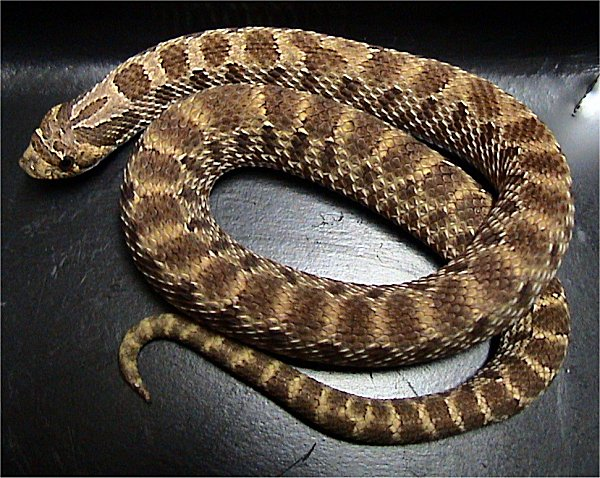
  - A living Heterodon nasicus, or Western hognose snake
    †Heterodon nasicus – or unidentified comparable form
  - †Heterodon platyrhinos – or unidentified comparable form
- †Heteromeryx
- Hexaplex
- †Hipparion
- †Hippidion
- Hippodamia
  - †Hippodamia convergens – tentative report
- Hipponix
- †Hippotherium
- Holbrookia
- †Holmesina
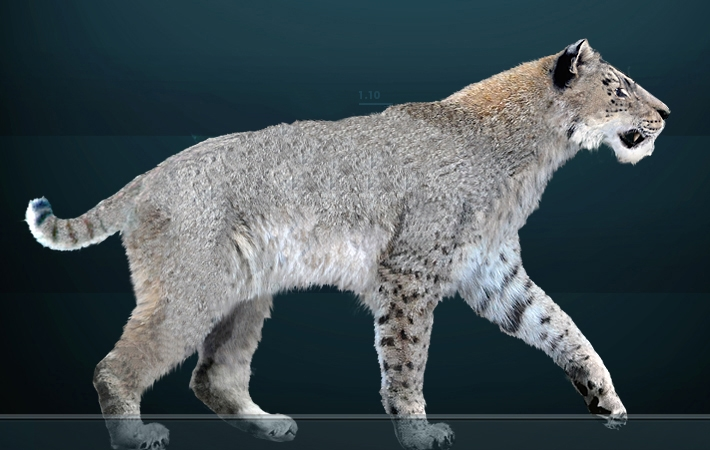
- Restoration of Pliocene-Pleistocene Homotherium, or scimitar cat
  †Homotherium
  - †Homotherium serum
- †Hyaenodon
  - †Hyaenodon crucians
  - †Hyaenodon horridus – or unidentified comparable form
  - †Hyaenodon montanus
  - †Hyaenodon raineyi
  - †Hyaenodon vetus – or unidentified comparable form
- Hyla
- †Hyopsodus
- Hyotissa
- †Hypertragulus
- †Hypohippus
- †Hypolagus
- †Hyrachyus
- †Hyracodon
- †Hyracotherium
  - †Hyracotherium vasacciense
- Ictalurus
  - †Ictalurus punctatus
- †Ictiobus
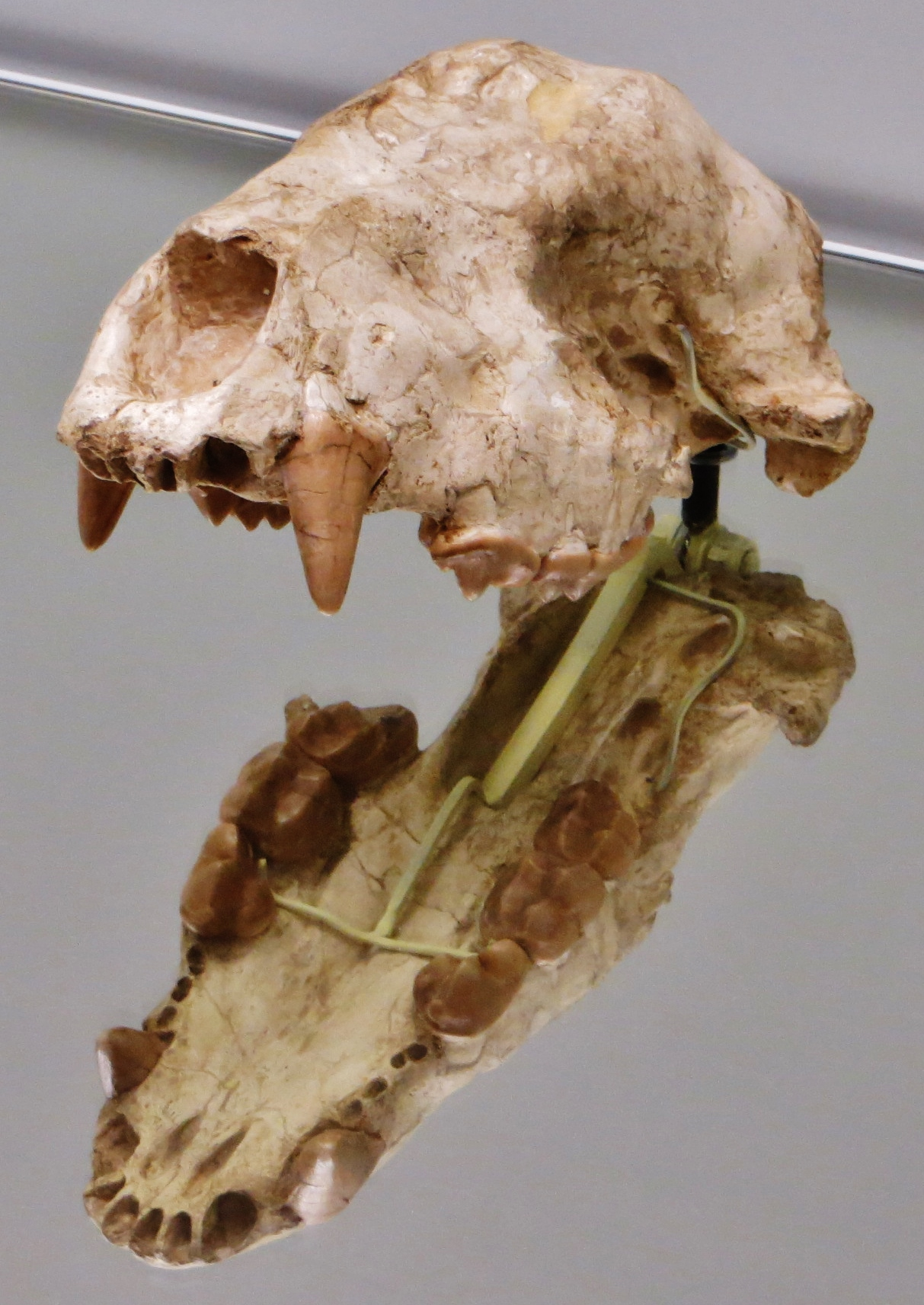
- Fossilized skull of the Miocene bear Indarctos
  †Indarctos
- †Inga
- †Ischyrocyon
- †Ischyromys
- Isognomon
- †Jefitchia – type locality for genus
- Juglans
- †Kalobatippus
- Kinosternon
  - †Kinosternon flavescens
- Kuphus
- †Lacunaria
- †Lambdoceras
- †Lambertocyon
  - †Lambertocyon eximius
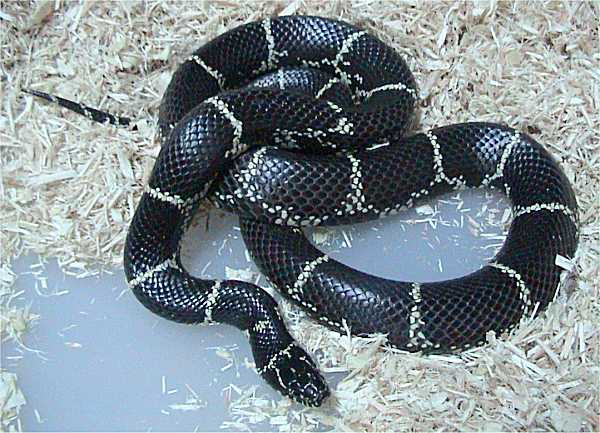
- A living Lampropeltis getula, or eastern kingsnake
  Lampropeltis
  - †Lampropeltis getulus
  - †Lampropeltis triangulum
- Lasionycteris
  - †Lasionycteris noctivagans
- Lasiurus
  - †Lasiurus borealis
- Latirus
- †Ledina
- †Leea
- Lepisosteus
  - †Lepisosteus spatula – or unidentified comparable form
- Lepomis
  - †Lepomis cyanellus – or unidentified comparable form
- †Leptictis
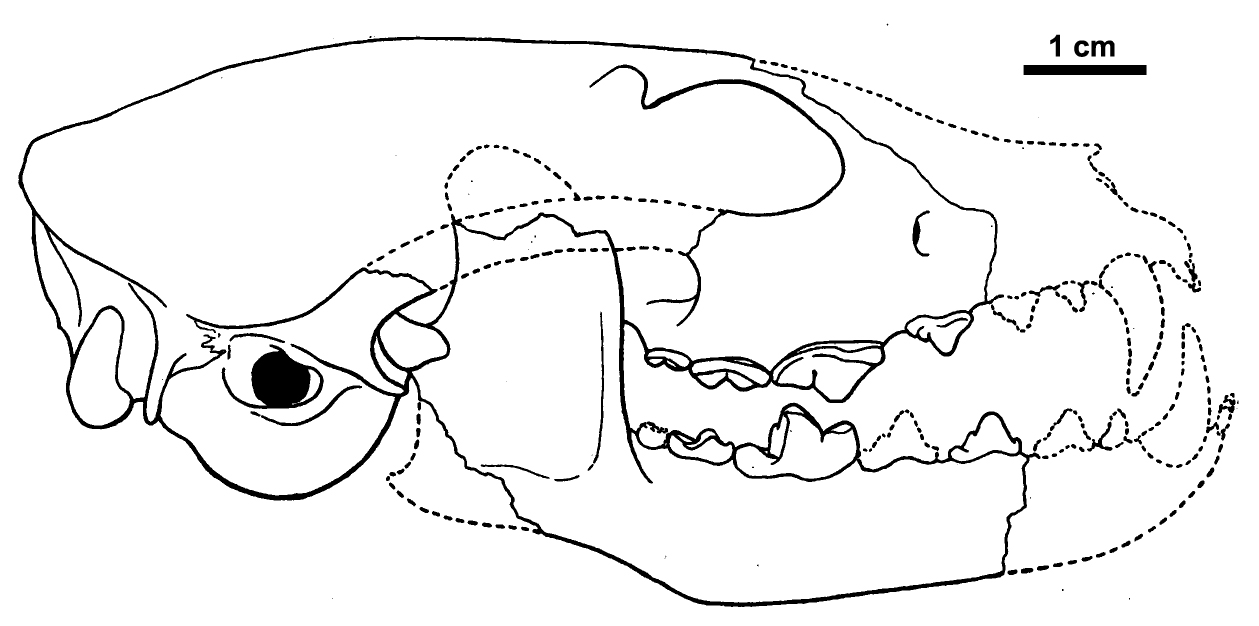
- Illustration of a fossilized skull of the Oligocene-Miocene dog Leptocyon
  †Leptocyon
- †Leptoreodon
- Lepus
  - †Lepus californicus
- Limacina
- Limaria
- †Limnenetes
- †Linthia
- Lithophaga
- Litiopa
- Littorina
- †Longirostromeryx
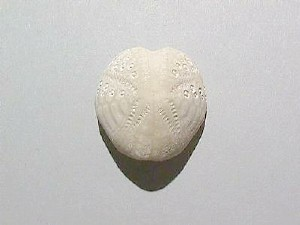
- Shell of a Lovenia sea urchin
  Lovenia
- Lucina
- Lunatia – report made of unidentified related form or using admittedly obsolete nomenclature
- Lunularia – tentative report
- Lymnaea
- Lynx
  - †Lynx rufus
- Lyria
- Lytta
- †Machairodus
- Macrocallista
- Mactra
- Madrepora
- Magnolia
- †Mahgarita
- †Mammut
  - †Mammut americanum
- †Mammuthus
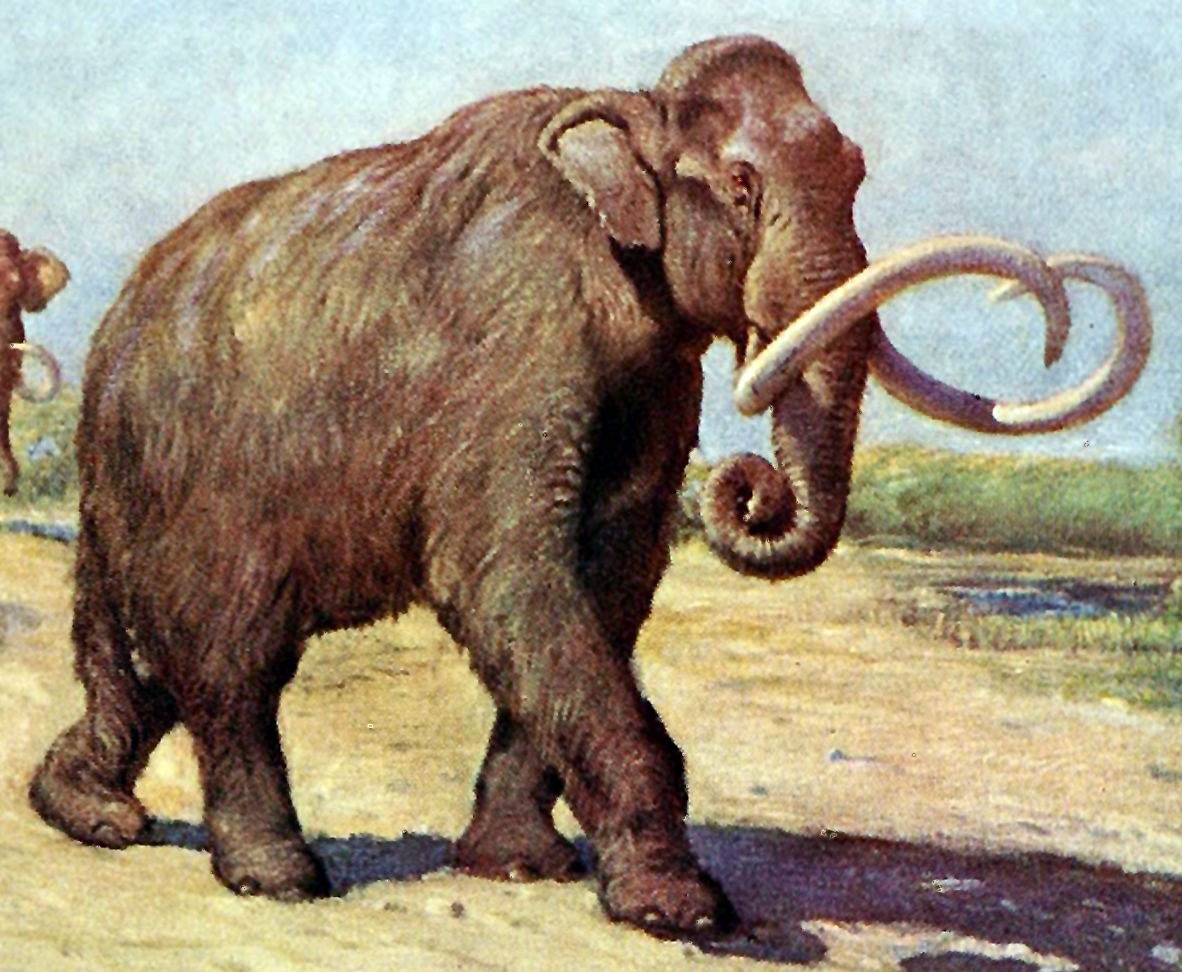
  - Life restoration of a herd of Mammuthus columbi, or Columbian mammoths. The extent of the fur depicted is hypothetical. Charles R. Knight (1909).
    †Mammuthus columbi
- Marginella
- Marmota
  - †Marmota flaviventris
- Martes
- Martesia
- †Mathilda – tentative report
- †Mathilda – or unidentified comparable form
- †Mathilda
- †Mauricia
- †Megalictis – tentative report
- †Megalonyx
  - †Megalonyx jeffersonii – or unidentified comparable form
  - †Megalonyx leptostomus
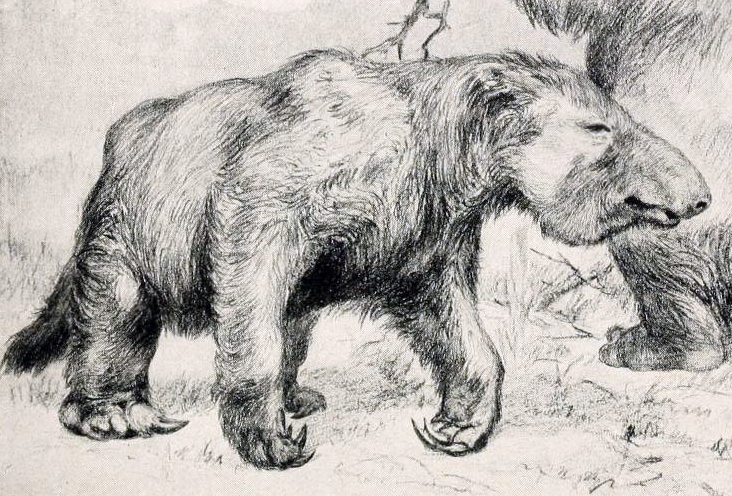
- Restoration of the Pliocene-Holocene ground sloth Megatherium. Robert Bruce Horsfall (1913).
  †Megatherium
- †Megatylopus
- Melanella
- †Menetus
- †Menoceras
- †Menops
- Mephitis
  - †Mephitis mephitis
- Meretrix
- †Merychippus
  - †Merychippus sejunctus
- †Merychyus
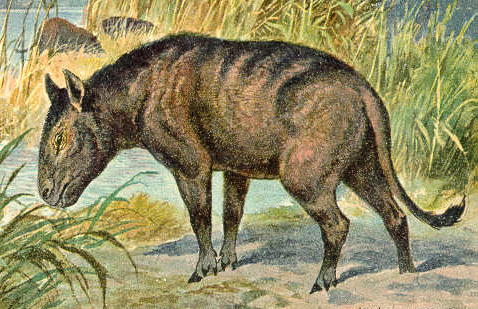
- Restoration of the Eocene-Oligocene oreodont mammal Merycoidodon. Heinrich Harder (1920).
  †Merycoidodon
- Mesalia
- †Mescalerolemur – type locality for genus
  - †Mescalerolemur horneri – type locality for species
- Mesodesma
- †Mesodma
  - †Mesodma pygmaea – or unidentified comparable form
  - †Mesodma thompsoni
- †Mesohippus
- †Metalopex
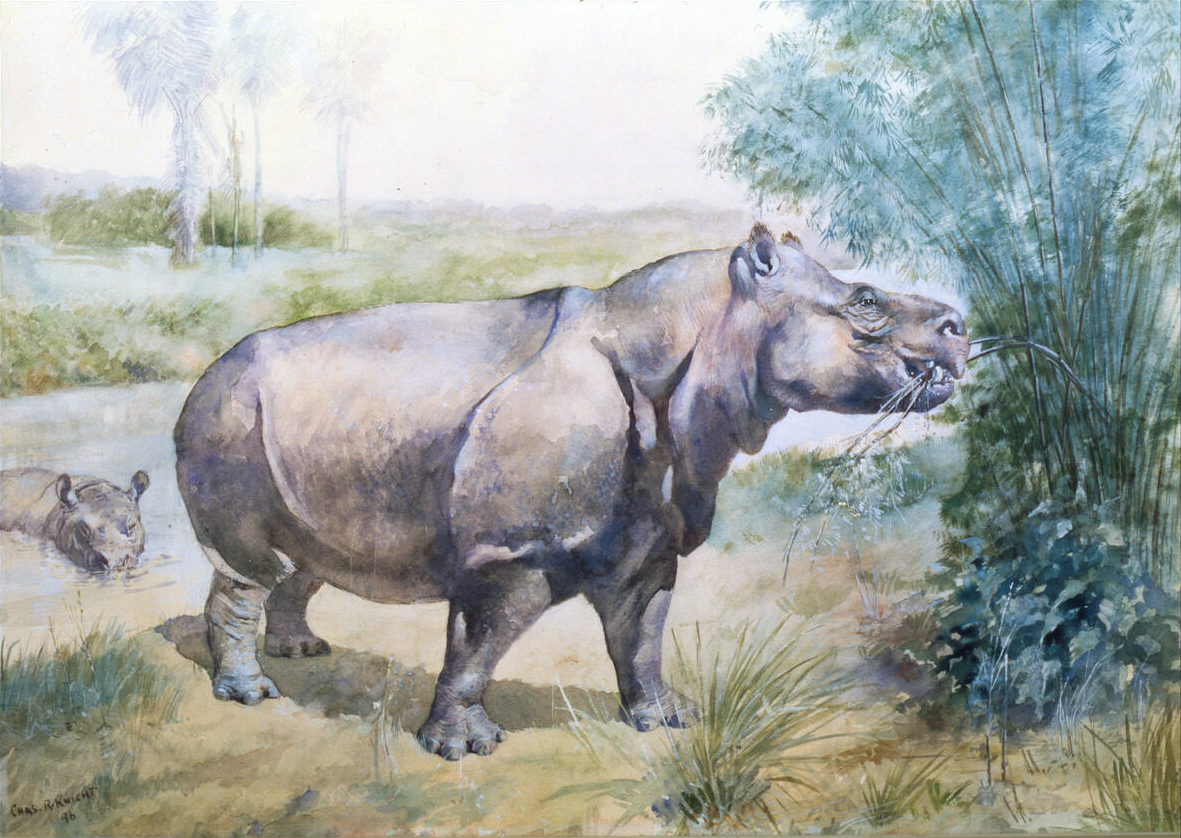
- Restoration of the Eocene-Miocene swamp rhinoceros Metamynodon. Charles R. Knight (1896).
  †Metamynodon
- Metula
- †Michela
- †Michenia
- Microdrillia
- Micropterus
- †Microsyops
- †Microtomarctus
- Microtus
  - †Microtus mexicanus
  - †Microtus pennsylvanicus
  - †Microtus pinetorum
- Micrurus
  - †Micrurus fulvius
- †Mimetodon
- †Miocyon
- †Miohippus
- †Miracinonyx
  - †Miracinonyx inexpectatus – or unidentified comparable form
  - †Miracinonyx studeri
- Mitrella
- †Mixotoxodon
- Modiolus – tentative report
- †Moropus
- †Morrillia
- Murex
- Mustela
  - †Mustela vison
- Myctophum
- Myliobatis
- †Mylohyus
  - †Mylohyus fossilis
- Myotis
  - †Myotis lucifugus
  - †Myotis velifer
- Mytilus
- Myzinum – or unidentified comparable form
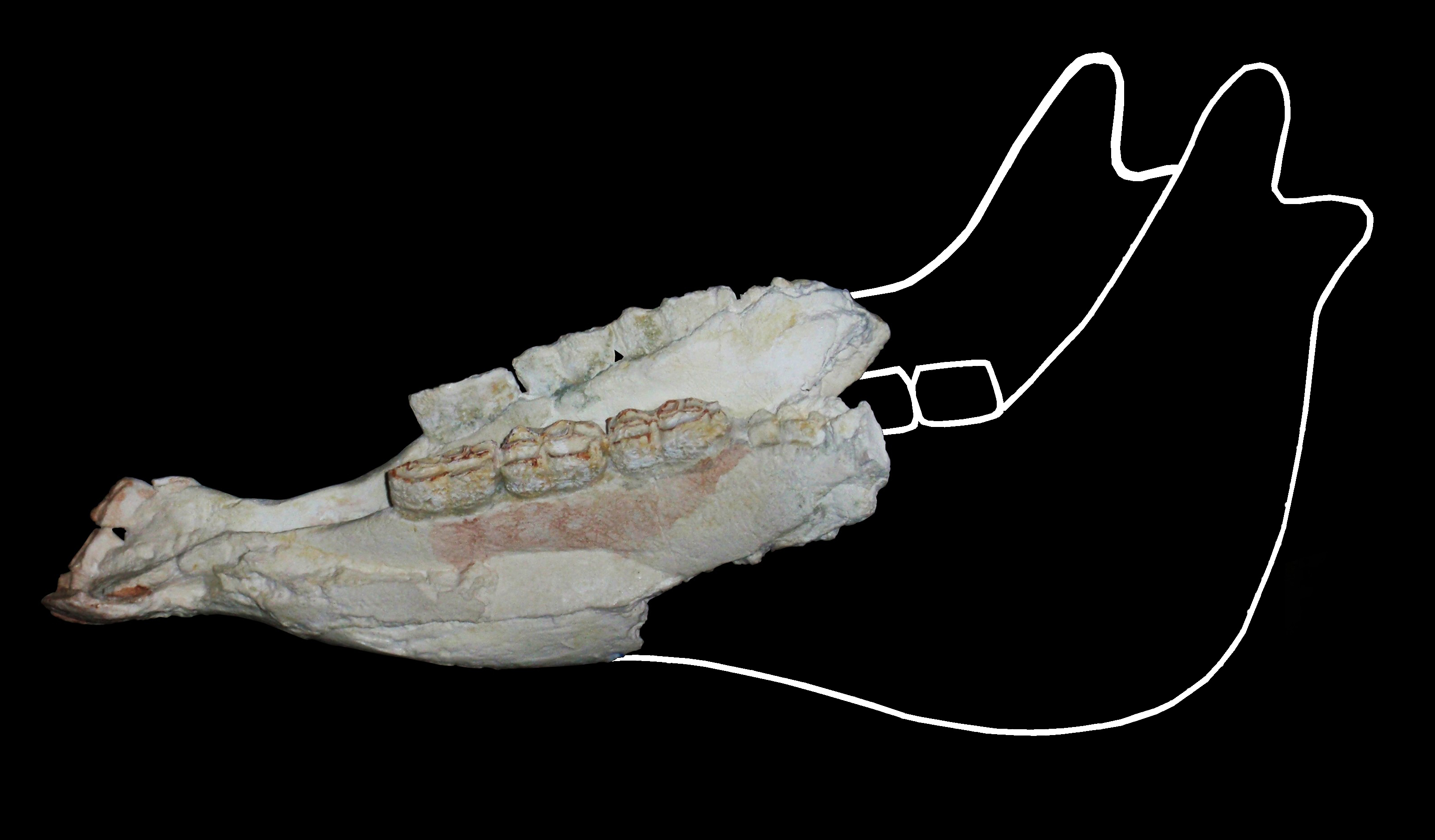
- Partial fossilized mandible of the Miocene-Pliocene horse Nannippus
  †Nannippus
- †Nanotragulus
- Narona
- Nassarius
- Nasua
- Natica
- Naticarius
- Natrix
  - †Natrix erythrogaster
- Nectandra
- †Neochoerus – type locality for genus
  - †Neochoerus pinckneyi
- Neofiber
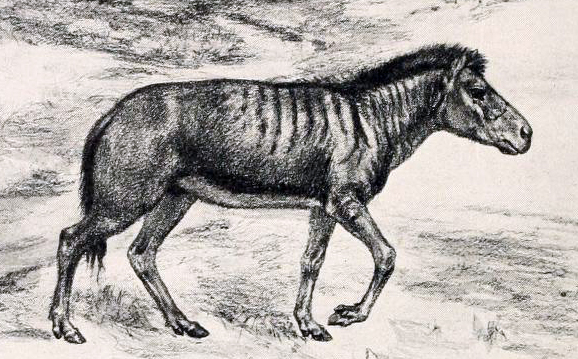
- Life restoration of a herd of Neohipparion. Robert Bruce Horsfall (1913).
  †Neohipparion
- Neotamias
  - †Neotamias cinereicollis
- Neotoma
  - †Neotoma albigula
  - †Neotoma floridana
  - †Neotoma mexicana
  - †Neotoma micropus
- Neptunea – report made of unidentified related form or using admittedly obsolete nomenclature
- Nerodia
  - †Nerodia fasciata
- Neverita
- †Nexuotapirus
- †Nimravides
- Niptus
- Norrisia
- †Notharctus
  - †Notharctus tenebrosus
- †Nothokemas
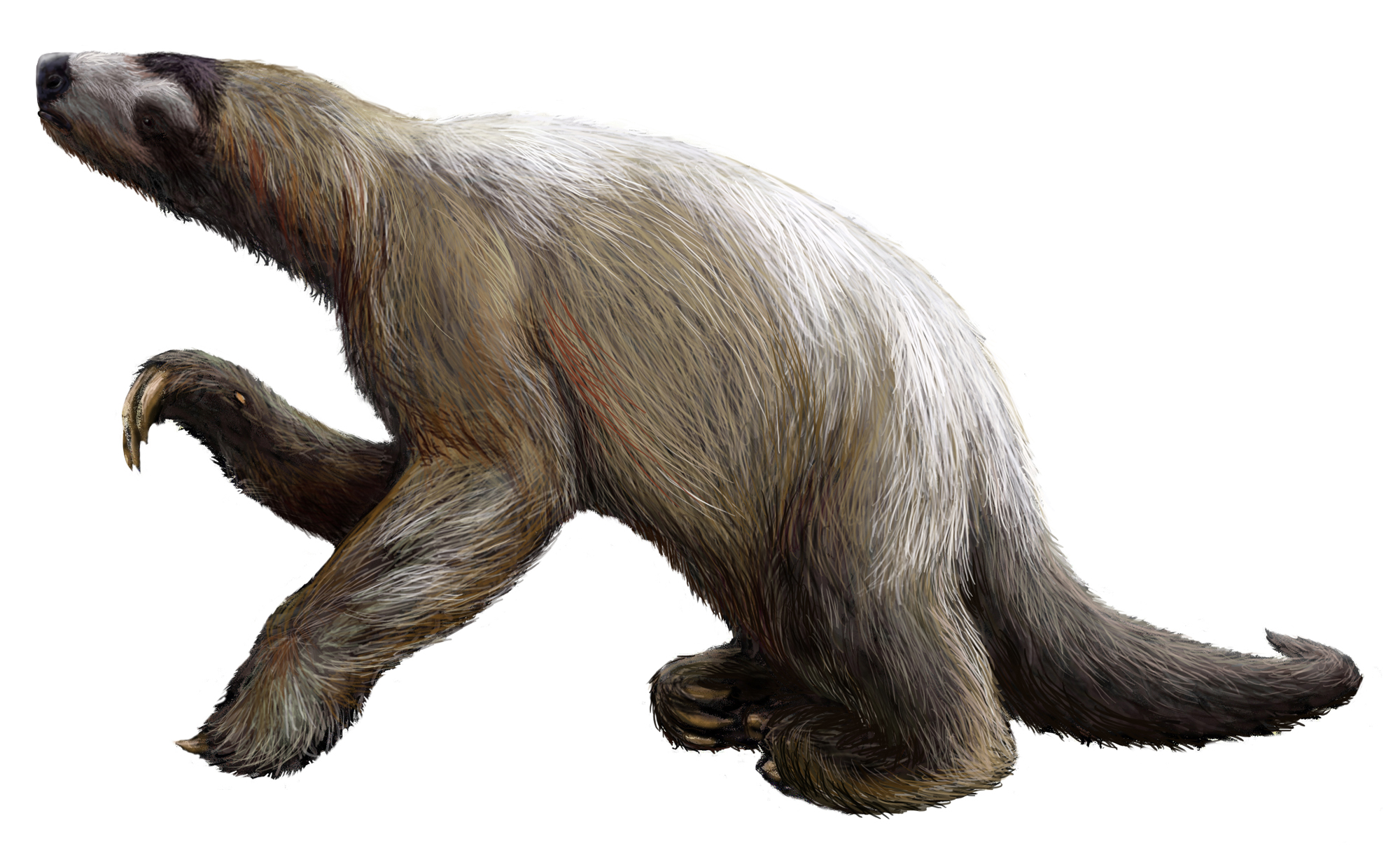
- Life restoration of the Pleistocene ground sloth Nothrotheriops
  †Nothrotheriops
- †Nothrotherium
- Notiosorex
  - †Notiosorex crawfordi
- †Notiotitanops
- Notophthalmus
- Nucula
- Nysius – tentative report
- Oculina
- Odocoileus
  - †Odocoileus virginianus
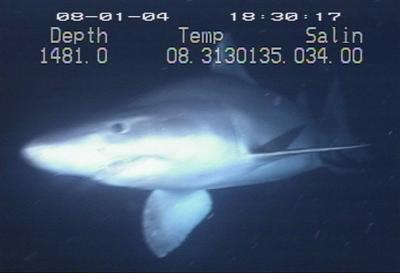
- A living Odontaspis sand shark
  Odontaspis
- Odostomia
- Olivella
- Ondatra
  - †Ondatra zibethicus
- Onychomys
  - †Onychomys leucogaster
  - †Onychomys torridus
- Opalia
- Opheodrys
  - †Opheodrys aestivus
- Ophisaurus
- †Oreodaphne
- Oryzomys
  - †Oryzomys palustris
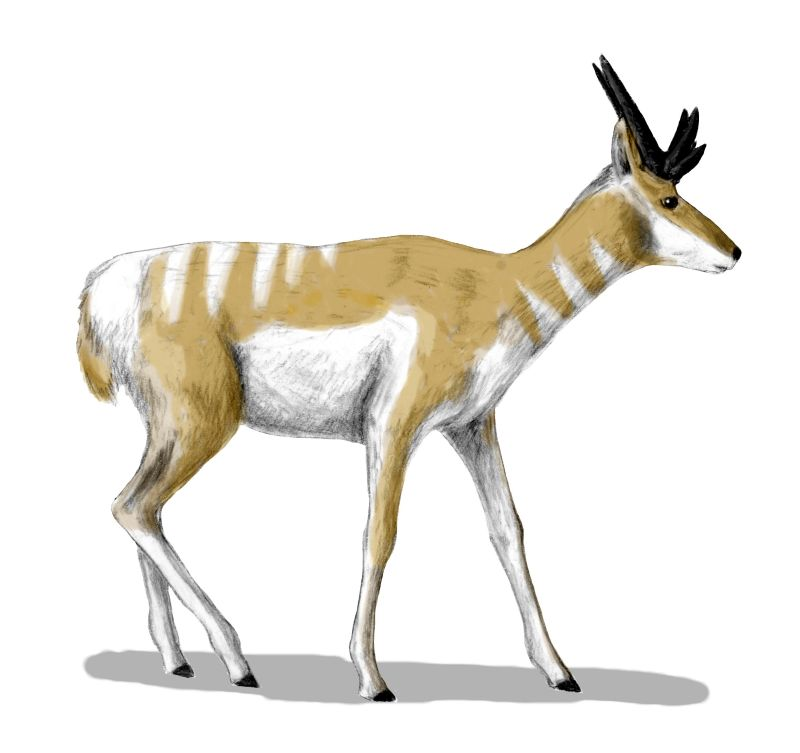
- Life restoration of the Miocene pronghorn Osbornoceros
  †Osbornoceros – tentative report
- Ostrea
- Ovis
  - †Ovis canadensis
- †Oxydactylus
- †Pachecoa
- †Palaeolama
- †Palaeophis
- Panopea
- Panthera
  - †Panthera leo
  - †Panthera onca
- †Paraenhydrocyon
- †Parahippus
  - †Parahippus leonensis – type locality for species
- †Paralbula
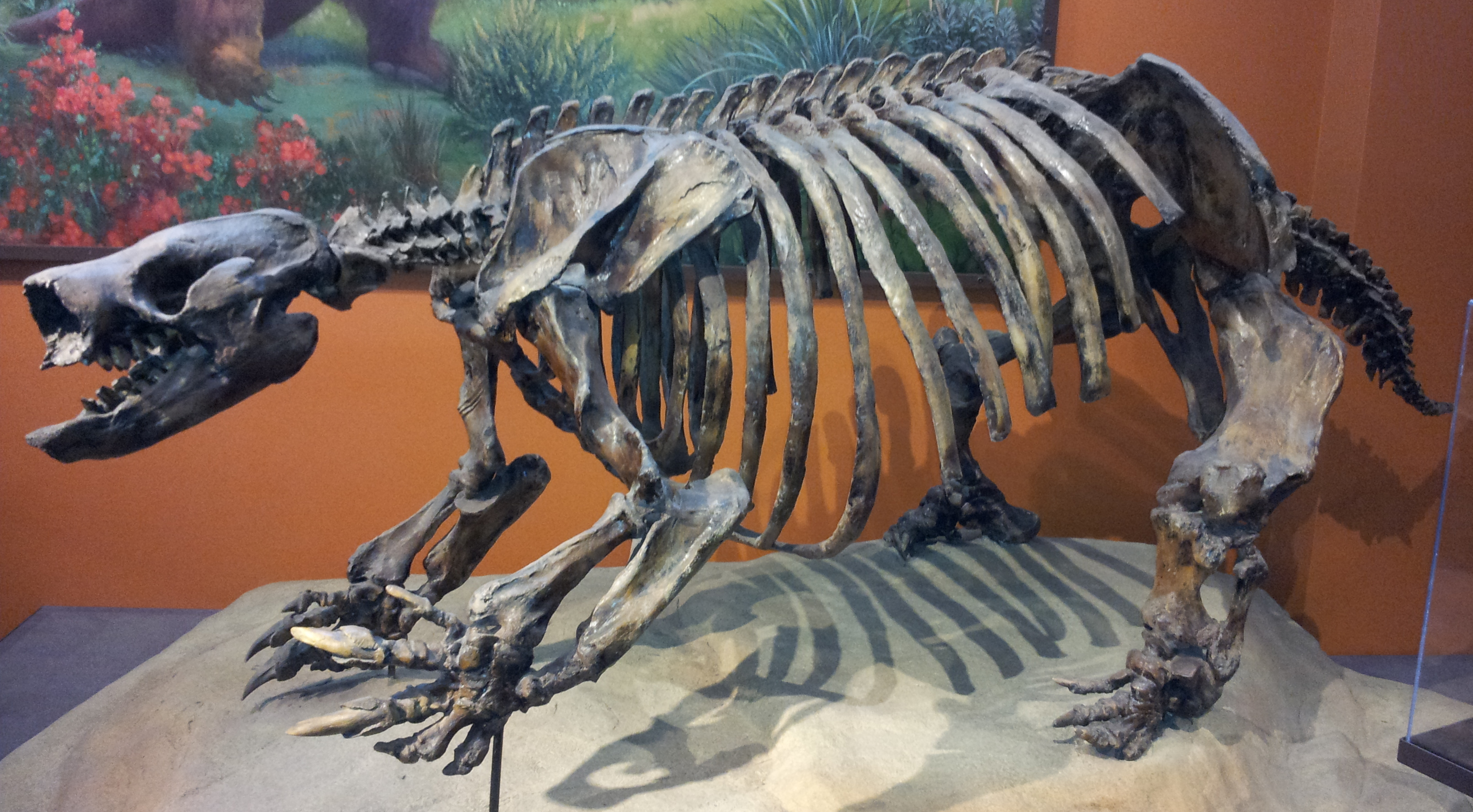
- Fossilized skeleton of the Pliocene-Pleistocene ground sloth Paramylodon
  †Paramylodon
  - †Paramylodon harlani
- †Paramys
- †Paratoceras
- †Paratomarctus
- †Parectypodus
  - †Parectypodus sloani
- †Paronychomys – tentative report
- †Parvitragulus
- †Pediomeryx
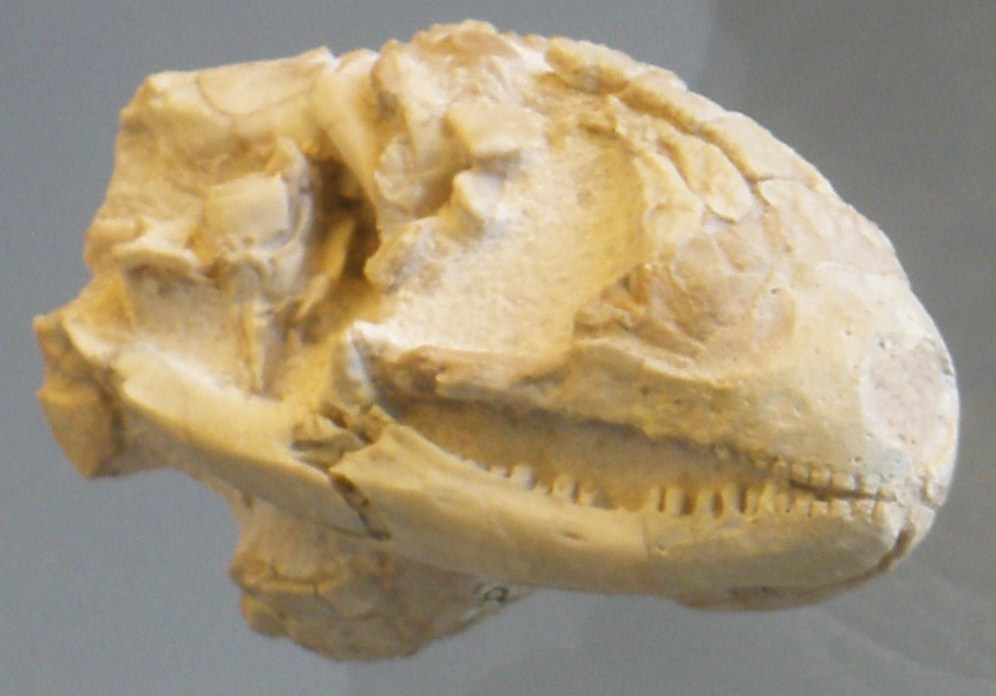
- Fossilized skull of the Eocene-Oligocene lizard Peltosaurus
  †Peltosaurus – tentative report
- †Peraceras
- †Peratherium
- Perognathus
  - †Perognathus flavus
- Peromyscus
  - †Peromyscus boylii
  - †Peromyscus difficilis
  - †Peromyscus eremicus
  - †Peromyscus gossypinus
  - †Peromyscus leucopus
  - †Peromyscus maniculatus
  - †Peromyscus pectoralis
- Phaedon – or unidentified comparable form
- Phalium
- †Phenacodus
- Philine
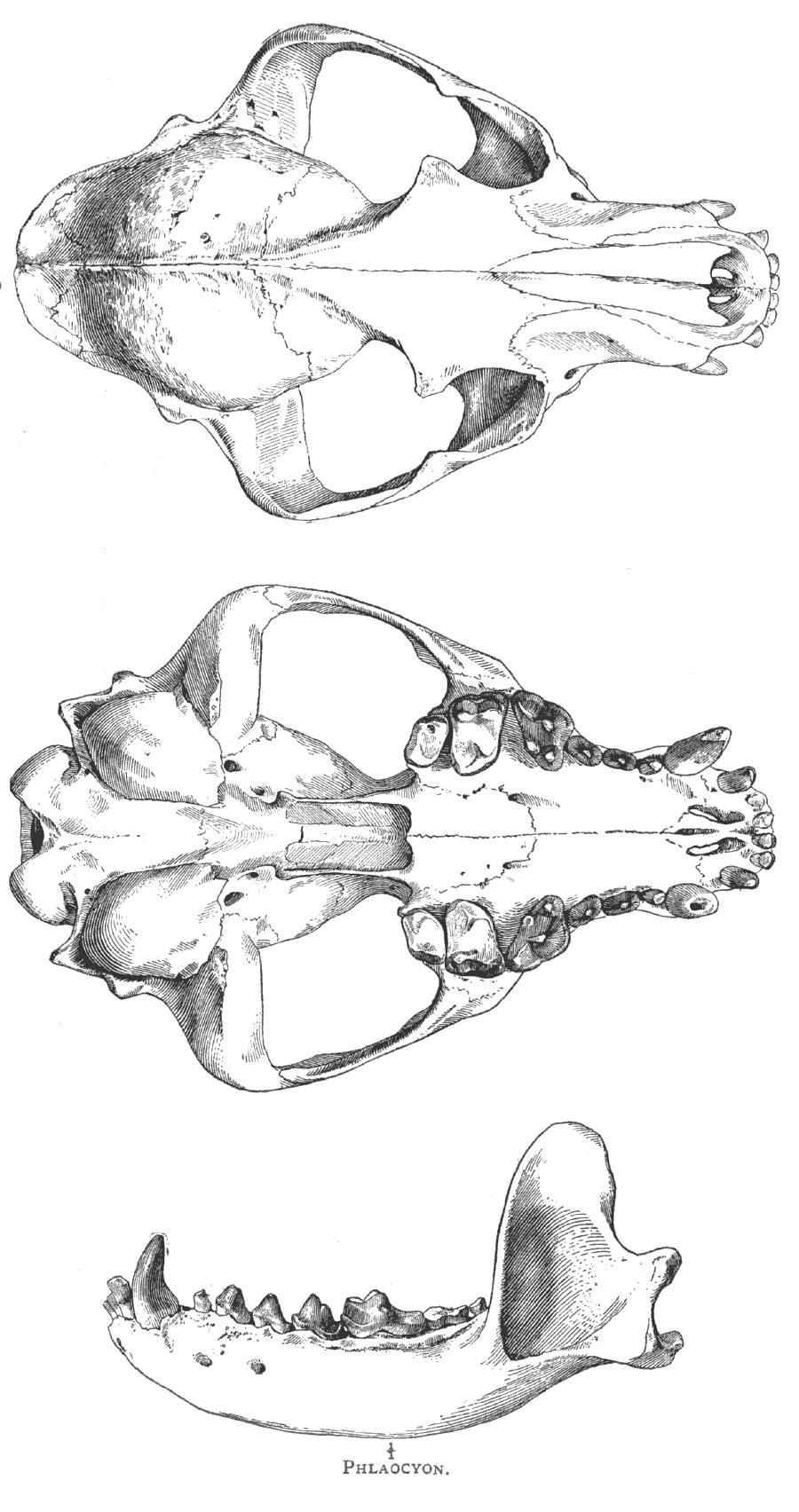
- Illustration of a fossilized skull in multiple views of the Oligocene-Miocene bone-crushing dog Phlaocyon
  †Phlaocyon
  - †Phlaocyon annectens
  - †Phlaocyon minor
- Pholadomya
- Pholas
- Phos
- Phrynosoma
  - †Phrynosoma cornutum
- Phyllodus
- Physa
- Pinna – tentative report
- Pisidium
  - †Pisidium nitidum
- Pitar
- Pituophis
  - †Pituophis melanoleucus
- Planorbis
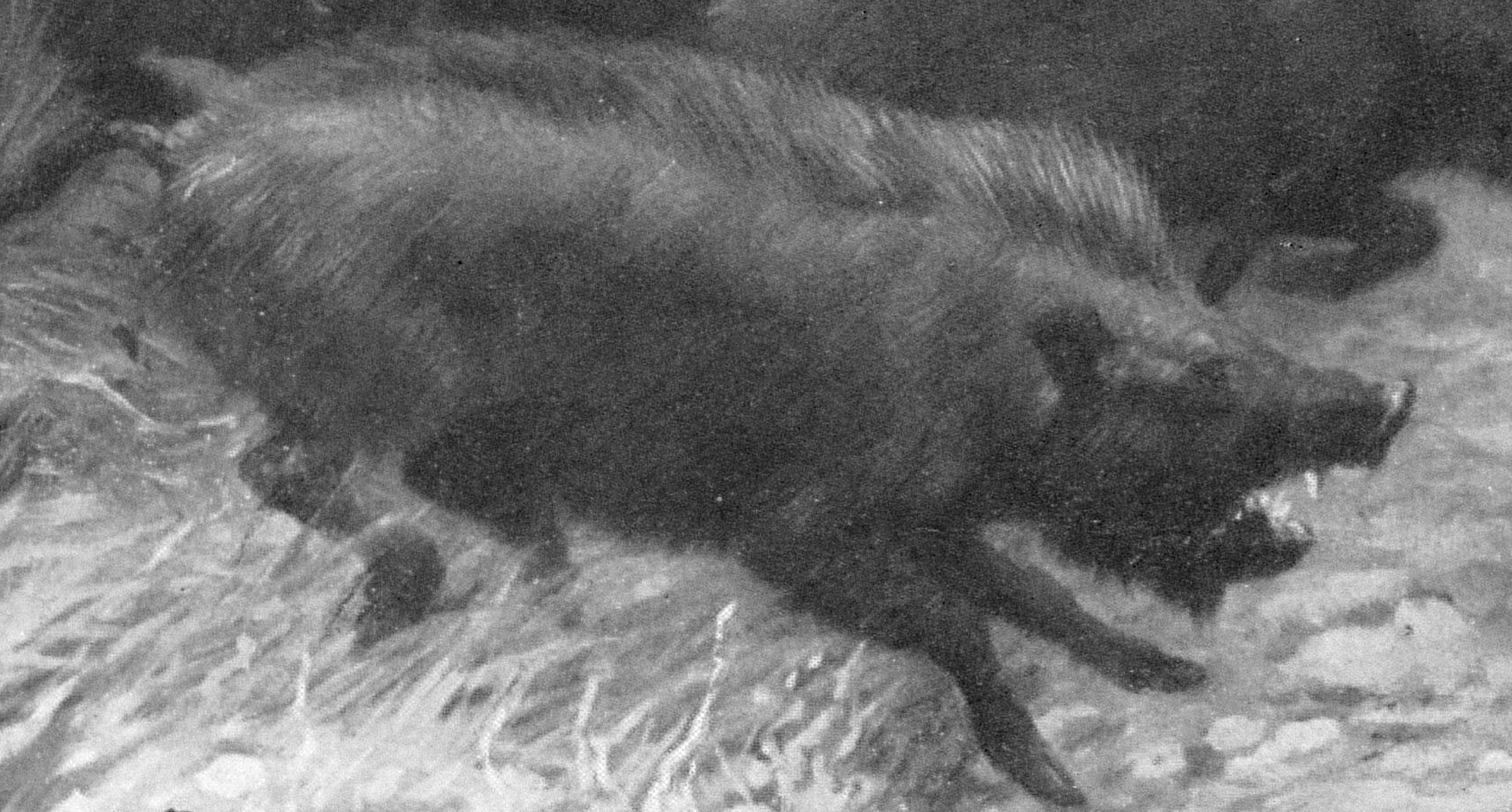
- Restoration of a herd of alarmed Miocene-Pleistocene peccaries of the genus Platygonus. Charles R. Knight (1922).
  †Platygonus
  - †Platygonus compressus
- †Pleiolama
- †Plesiocolopirus
- †Plesiogulo
- Pleurocera
- Pleurofusia
- Pleuromeris
- Pleuroploca
- †Pleurostoma
- Pleurotomella
- Plicatula
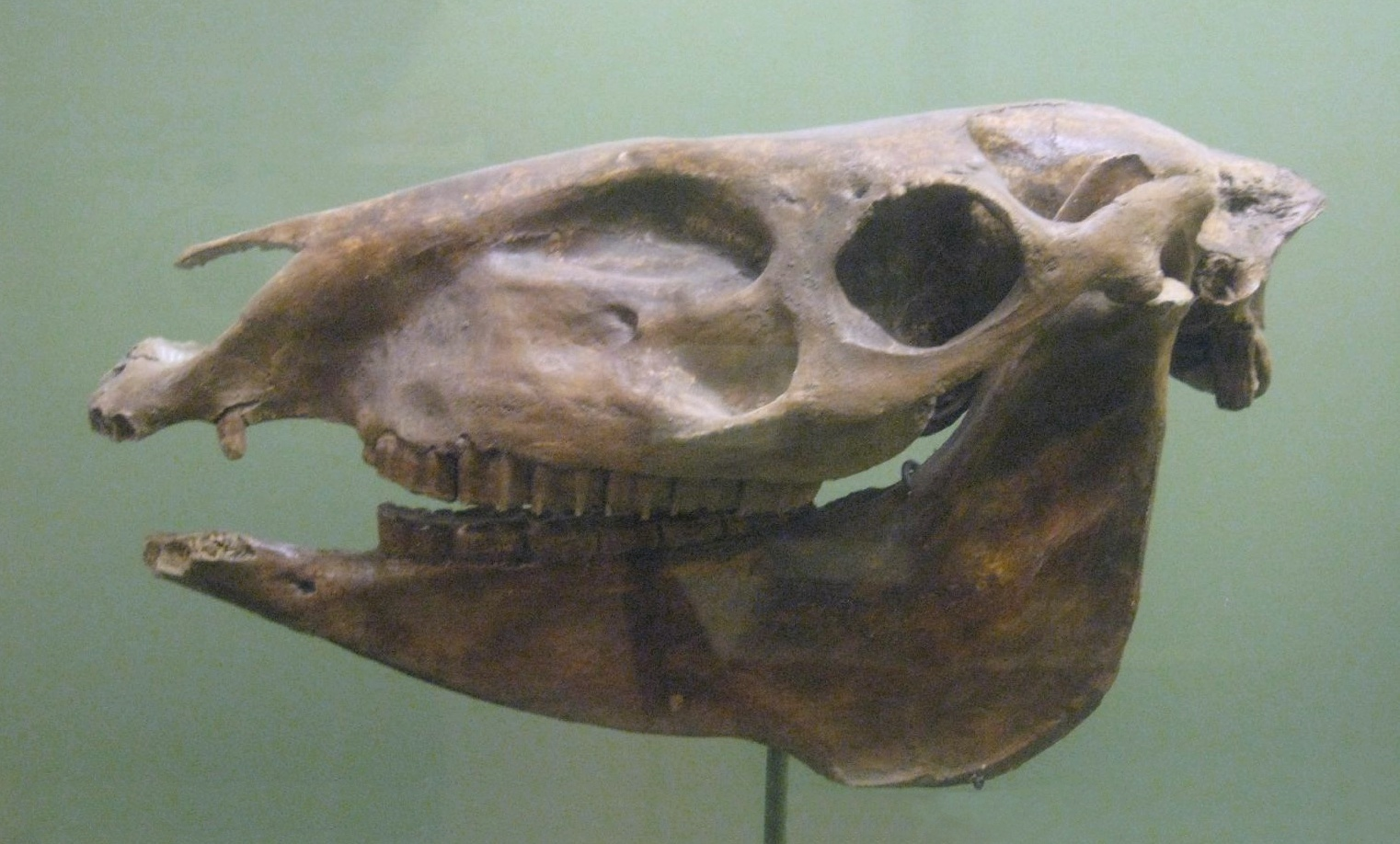
- Fossilized skull of the Miocene horse Pliohippus
  †Pliohippus
- †Pliometanastes
- †Poabromylus
- Podomys
- †Poebrotherium
- Polinices
- Polydora
- Polygyra
- Polyschides
- Porites
- †Potamides
- †Priscocamelus
- †Pristichampsus
- Pristis
- †Procamelus
  - †Procamelus leptognathus
  - †Procamelus occidentalis
- †Procastoroides
- †Procynodictis
- Procyon
  - †Procyon lotor
- †Prohesperocyon
  - †Prohesperocyon wilsoni
- Propeamussium
- †Prosimnia
- †Prosynthetoceras
- †Protitanotherium
- †Protoceras – tentative report
- †Protohippus
- †Protolabis
- †Protylopus – tentative report
- Pseudacris
  - †Pseudacris ocularis
  - †Pseudacris streckeri
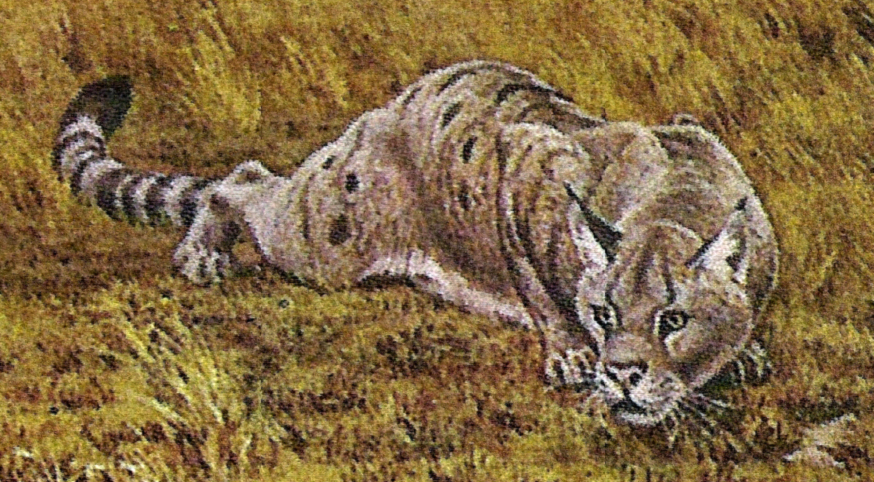
- Restoration of the Miocene cat Pseudaelurus
  †Pseudaelurus – tentative report
- †Pseudhipparion
- Pseudochama
- Pseudoliva
- †Pseudoprotoceras
- †Psittacotherium
- Pteria
- Pteris
- Pterothrissus
- Pterynotus
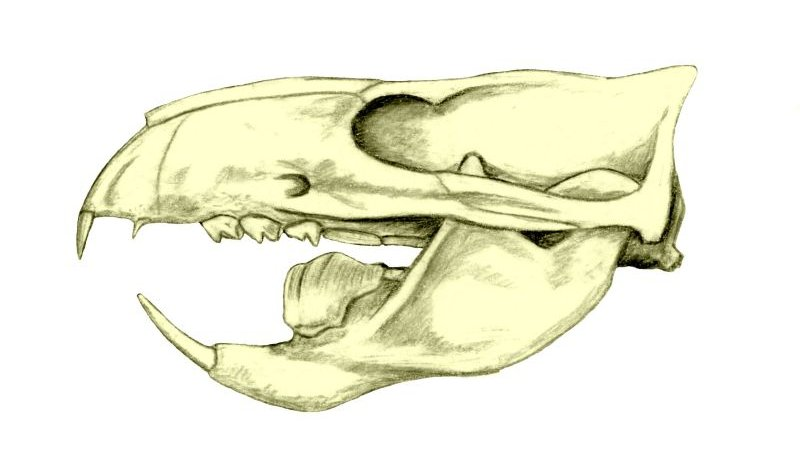
- Illustration of a fossilized skull of the Paleocene multituberculate mammal Ptilodus
  †Ptilodus
  - †Ptilodus mediaevus
- Ptinus
- Puma
  - †Puma concolor
- Pupilla
  - †Pupilla blandi
- Pupoides
- Pycnodonte
- †Pylodictis
  - †Pylodictis olivaris
- Pyramidella
- †Quadrula
- Quinqueloculina
- †Raja
  - †Raja texana – type locality for species
- †Rana
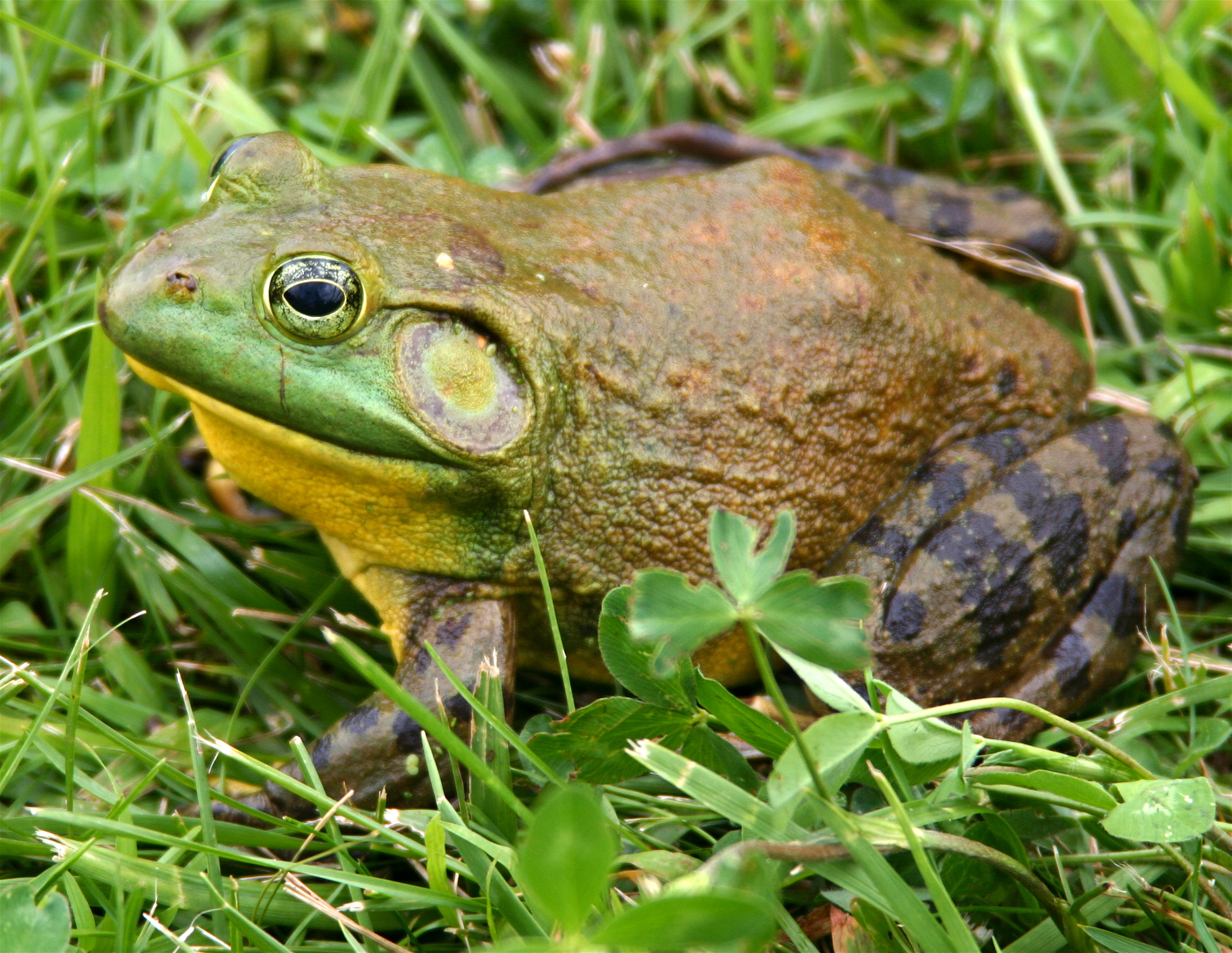
  - A living Rana catesbeiana (sometimes Lithobates catesbeianus), or American bullfrog
    †Rana catesbiana – lapsus calami of Rana catesbeiana
  - †Rana pipiens
- Ranularia
- Raphitoma
- Reithrodontomys
  - †Reithrodontomys fulvescens
  - †Reithrodontomys megalotis
  - †Reithrodontomys montanus
- †Retinella
- Retusa
- Rhinobatos
- Rhinocheilus
  - †Rhinocheilus lecontei
- Rhinoptera
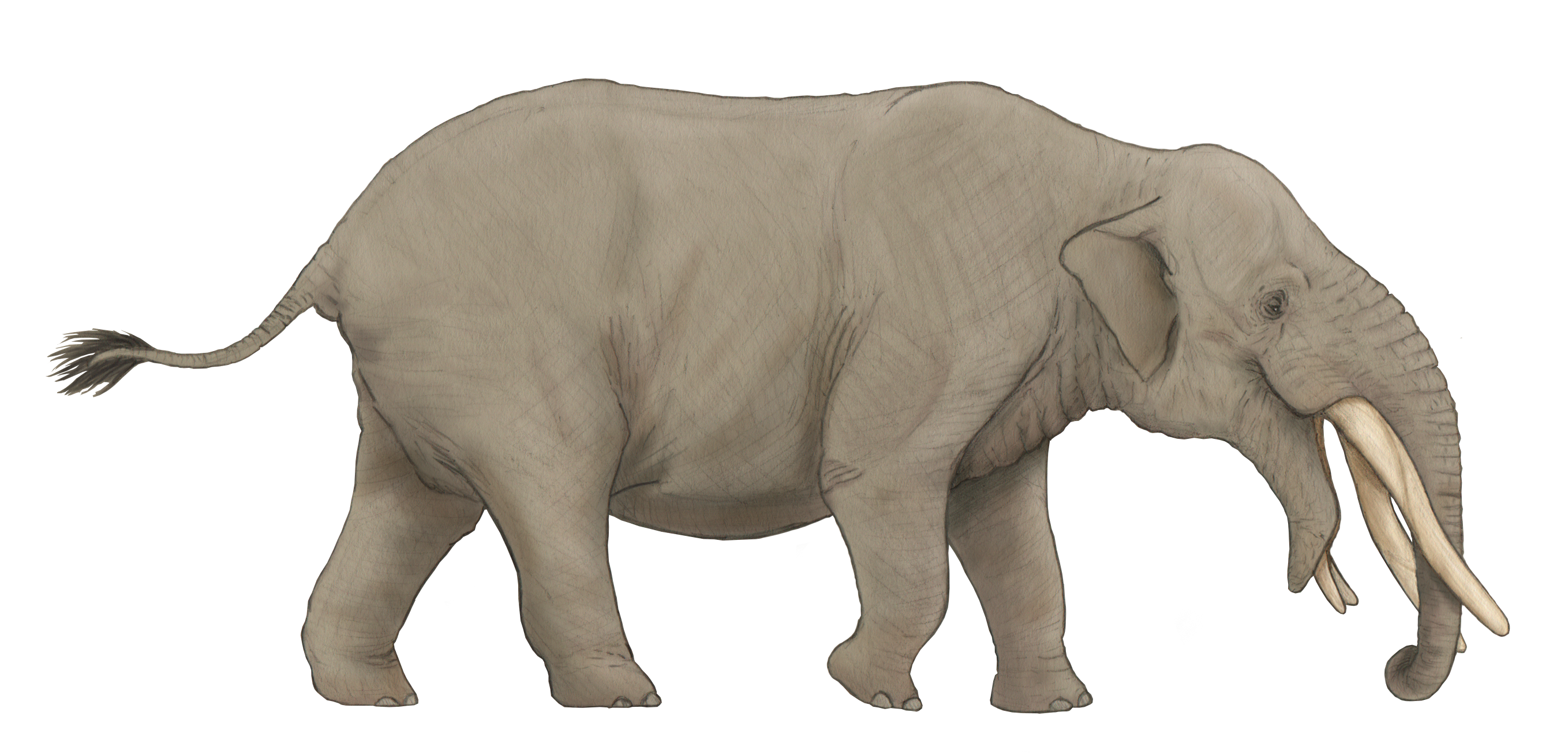
- Restoration of the Miocene-Pliocene elephant relative Rhynchotherium
  †Rhynchotherium – tentative report
- Rimella
- Ringicula
- †Rooneyia – type locality for genus
  - †Rooneyia viejaensis – type locality for species
- †Rotalia
- †Rotularia
- Salvadora
- †Sapindus
- Sassia
- Scalopus
  - †Scalopus aquaticus
- Scaphander
- Scaphella
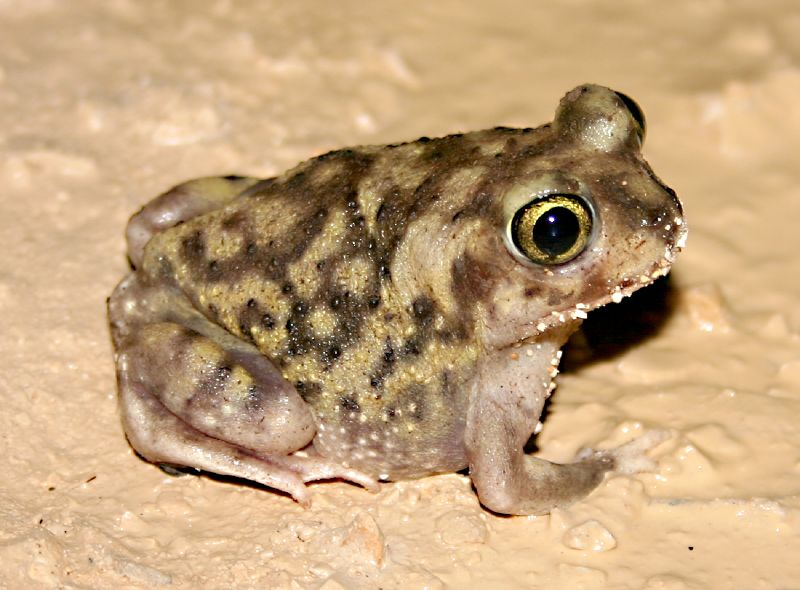
- A living Scaphiopus, or North American spadefoot toad
  Scaphiopus
- †Scaphites
- Sceloporus
  - †Sceloporus olivaceus
  - †Sceloporus undulatus
- Sciurus
  - †Sciurus carolinensis
  - †Sciurus niger
- †Selaginella
- Selenophorus – or unidentified comparable form
- Semele
- Serpulorbis
- Sigatica
- Sigmodon
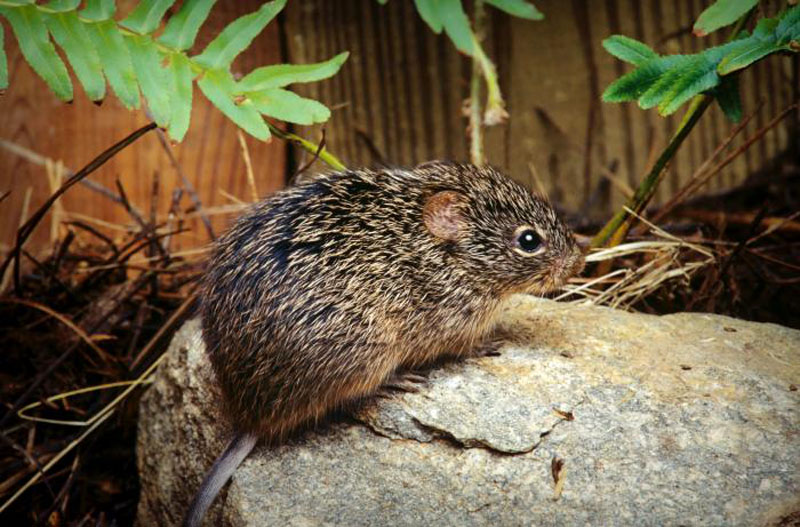
  - A living Sigmodon, or cotton rat
    †Sigmodon hispidus
- Siliqua
- Simnia
- †Sinopa
- Sinum
- Siphonalia
- Siren
  - †Siren miotexana – type locality for species
- Skena
- Skenea
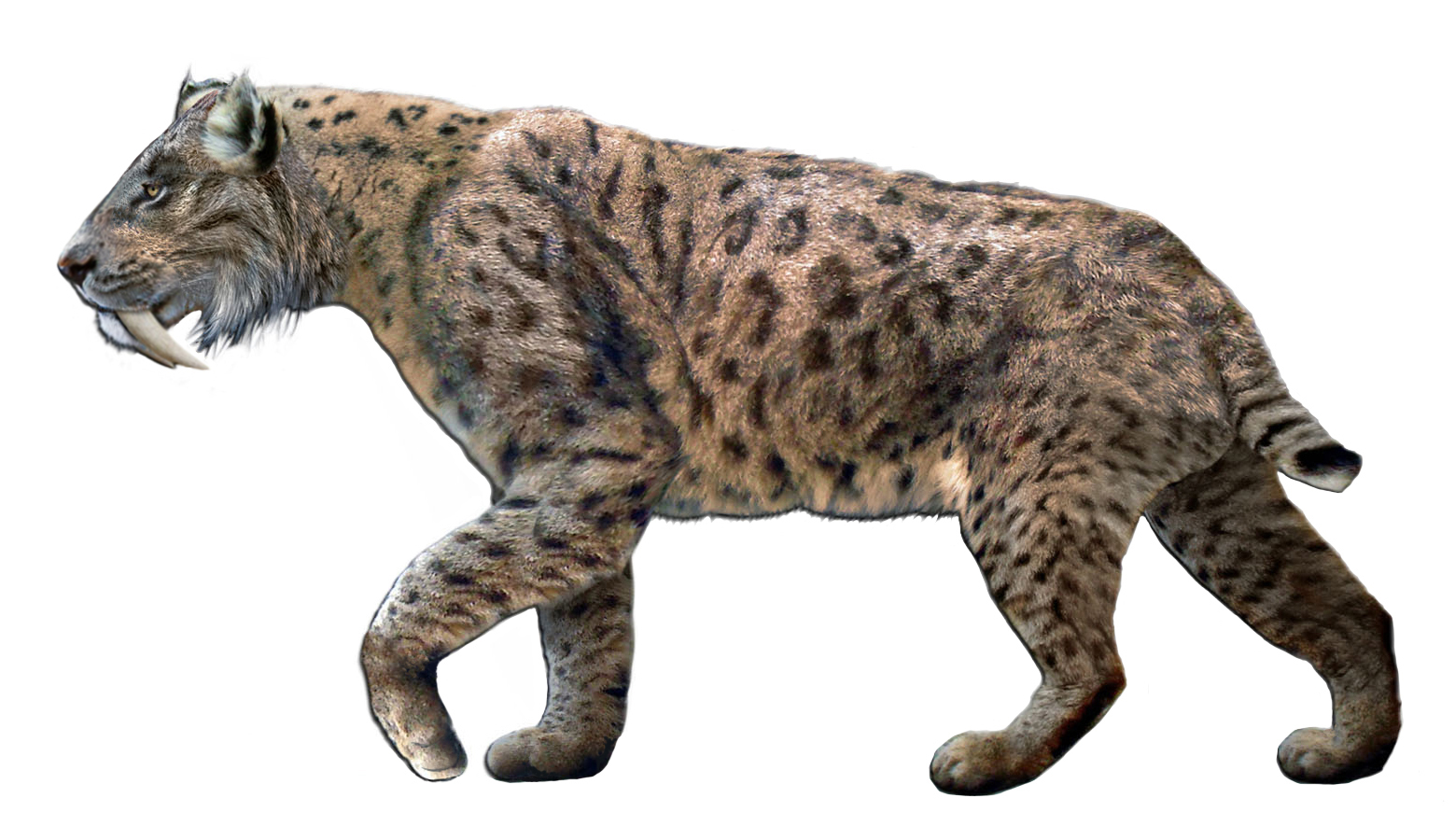
- Life restoration of the Pleistocene-Holocene saber-tooth cat Smilodon
  †Smilodon
  - †Smilodon fatalis
- †Soergelia
  - †Soergelia mayfieldi
- Solariella
- Solemya
- Solen
- †Sophora
- Sorex
  - †Sorex cinereus
  - †Sorex palustris
  - †Sorex vagrans
- Spermophilus
  - †Spermophilus elegans – or unidentified comparable form
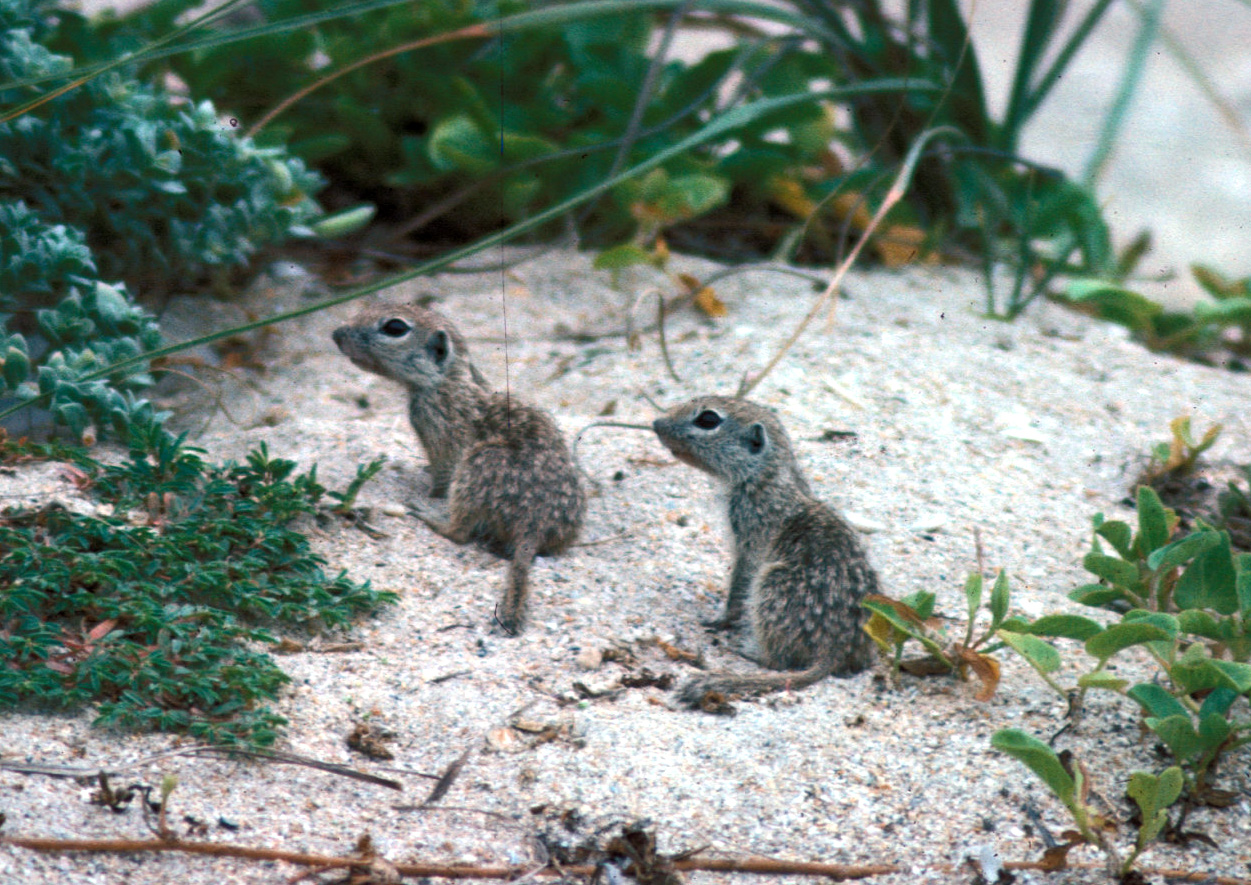
  - A living Xerospermophilus spilosoma, or spotted ground squirrel
    †Spermophilus spilosoma
  - †Spermophilus tridecemlineatus
  - †Spermophilus variegatus
- Sphaerium
- Spilogale
  - †Spilogale putorius
- Spirorbis
- Spirotropis
- Spisula
- Stagnicola
  - †Stagnicola reflexa
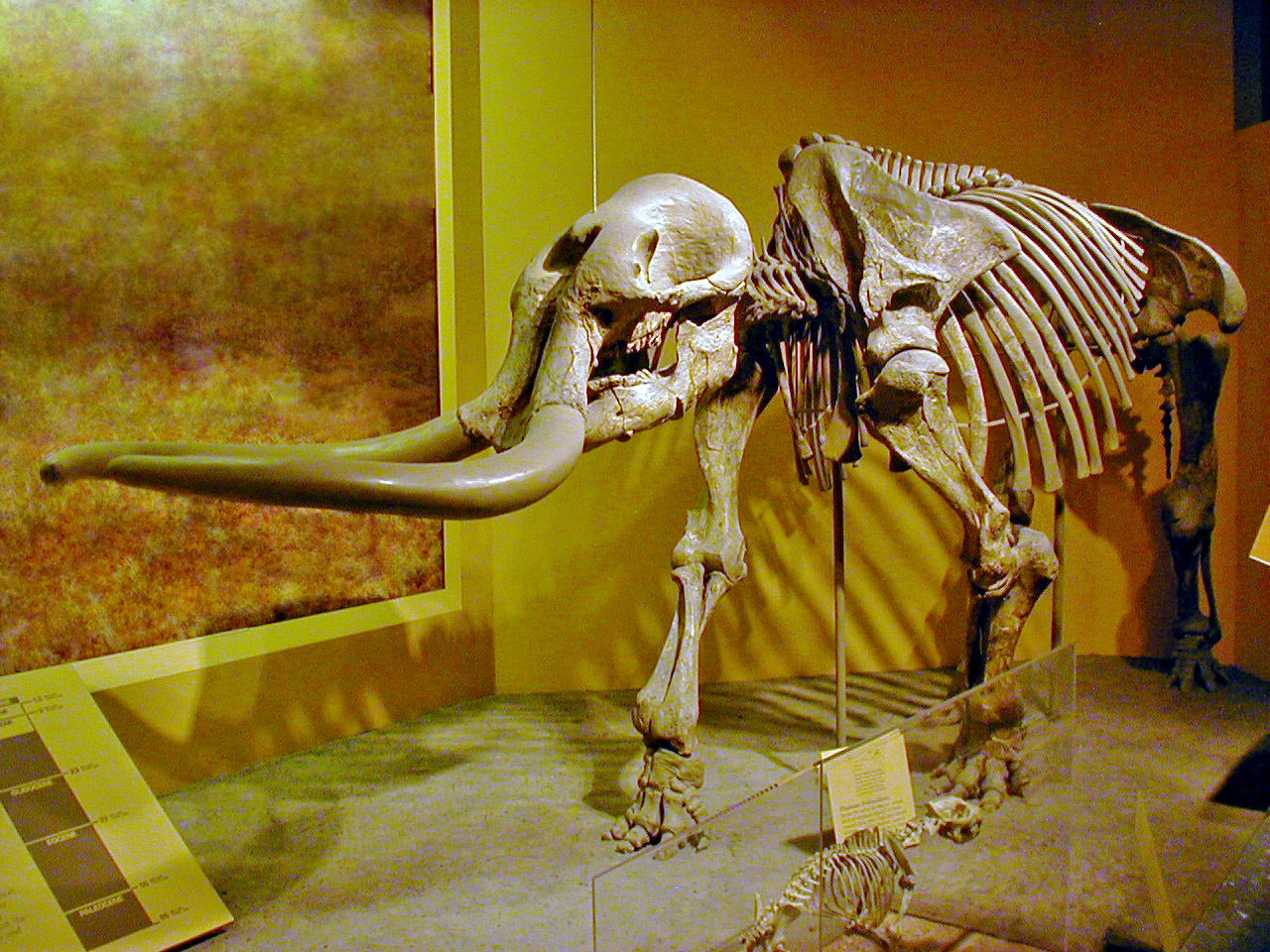
- Mounted fossilized skeleton of the Pliocene-Pleistocene elephant relative Stegomastodon
  †Stegomastodon
  - †Stegomastodon mirificus
- †Steneofiber
- †Stenomylus
- †Stenotrema
- Sternotherus
- Sthenictis
- †Stockoceros – or unidentified comparable form
- Storeria
  - †Storeria dekayi
- †Striatolamia
- Strobilops
- †Stygimys
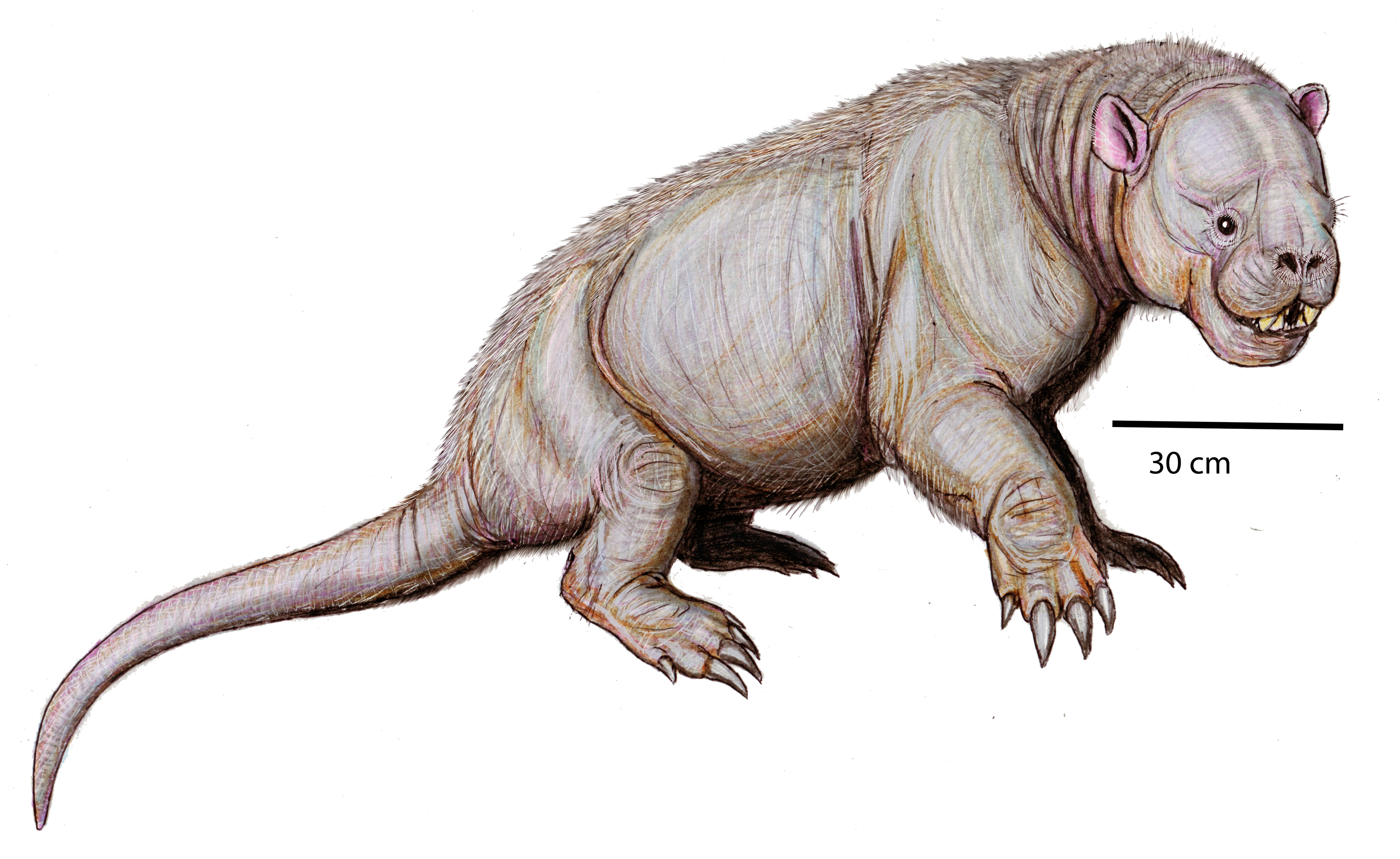
- Life restoration of the Eocene taeniodont mammal Stylinodon mirus
  †Stylinodon
- Succinea
- Sylvilagus
  - †Sylvilagus audubonii
  - †Sylvilagus floridanus
- Synaptomys
  - †Synaptomys cooperi
- †Synthetoceras
  - †Synthetoceras tricornatus – type locality for species
- Syrphus – or unidentified comparable form
- Tantilla
- Tanytarsus – tentative report
- Tapirus
  - †Tapirus veroensis
- Taxidea
  - †Taxidea taxus
- Teinostoma
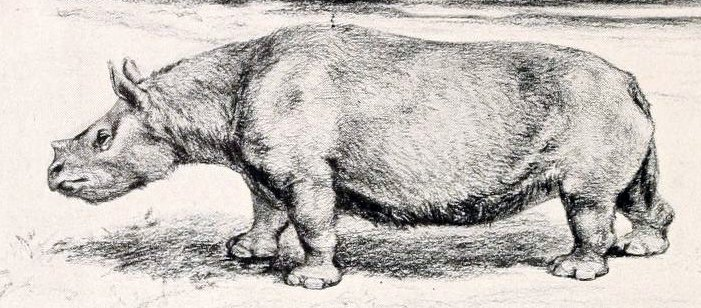
- Restoration of the Miocene-Pliocene rhinoceros Teleoceras
  †Teleoceras
  - †Teleoceras major
- Tellina
- Tenagodus
- †Tephrocyon
- Terebellum
- Terebra
- Teredo
- Terminalia
- Terrapene
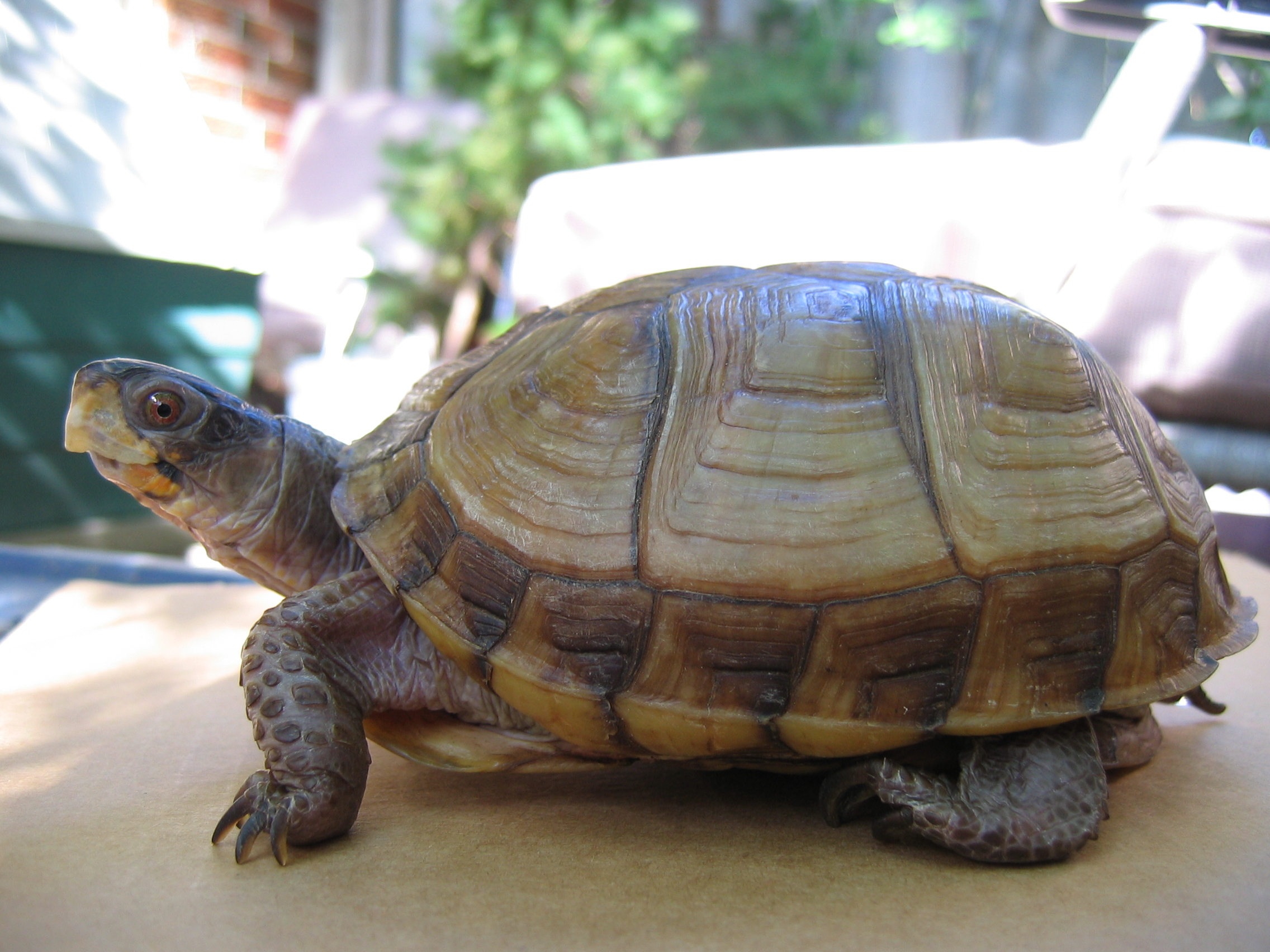
  - A living Terrapene carolina, or common box turtle
    †Terrapene carolina
  - †Terrapene ornata
- Testudo
- †Tetrameryx
- Thamnophis
  - †Thamnophis proximus
  - †Thamnophis saurita
  - †Thamnophis sirtalis
- Theodoxus
- †Thinobadistes
- Thomomys
  - †Thomomys bottae
  - †Thomomys talpoides – or unidentified comparable form
- †Ticholeptus
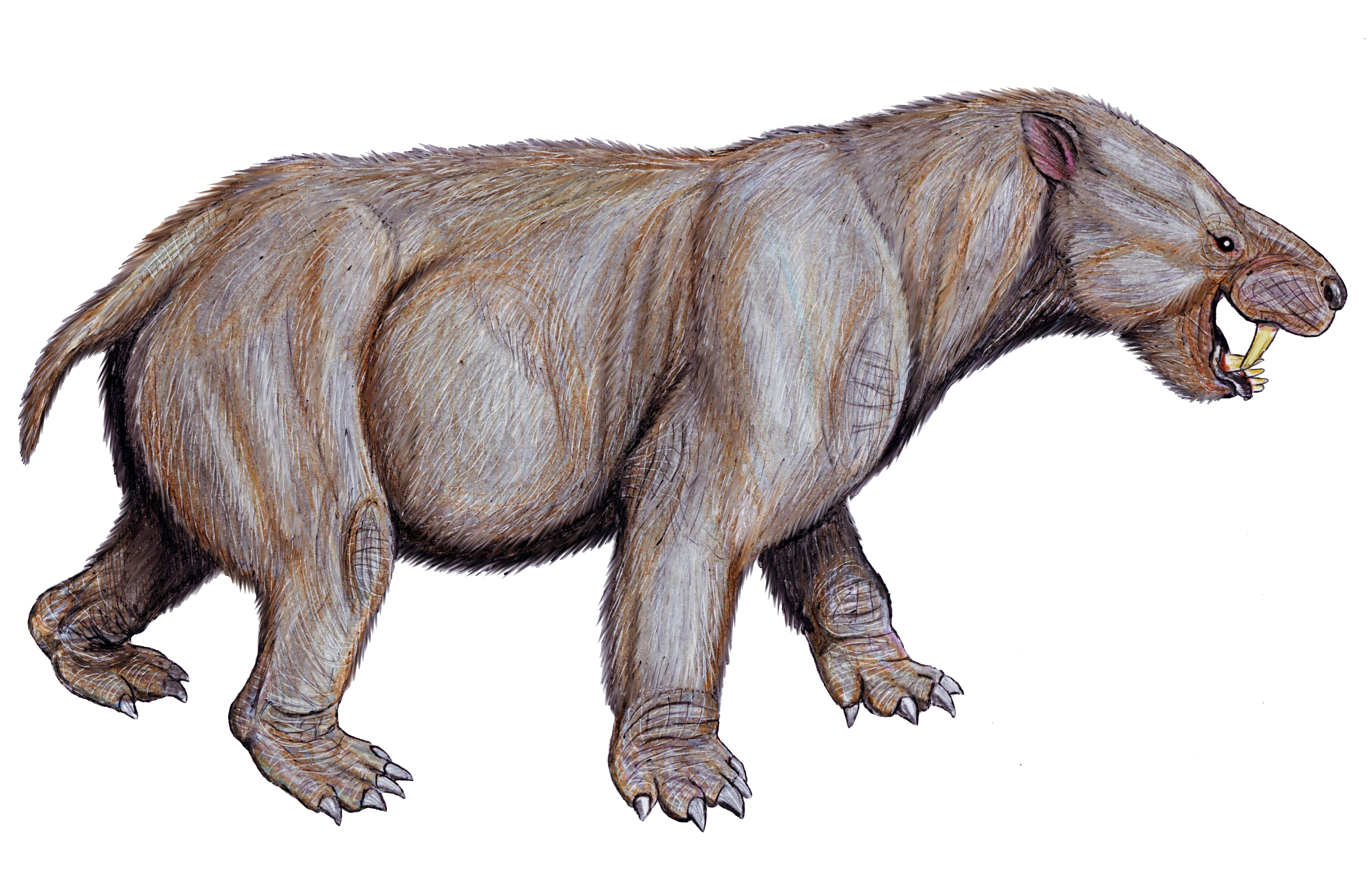
- Life restoration of the Paleocene pantodont mammal Titanoides
  †Titanoides
  - †Titanoides gidleyi – or unidentified comparable form
- †Tomarctus
  - †Tomarctus brevirostris
- †Toromeryx
- †Trigonias – tentative report
- Trigonostoma
- †Trinacria
- †Tripia
- Trochita
- Tropidoclonion
  - †Tropidoclonion lineatum
- †Truncilla
  - †Truncilla truncata
- †Trygon
- †Tuba
- Tucetona
- Turbonilla
- Turricula
- Turris
- Turritella
- Tympanuchus
- Typhina
- Tyto
  - †Tyto furcata
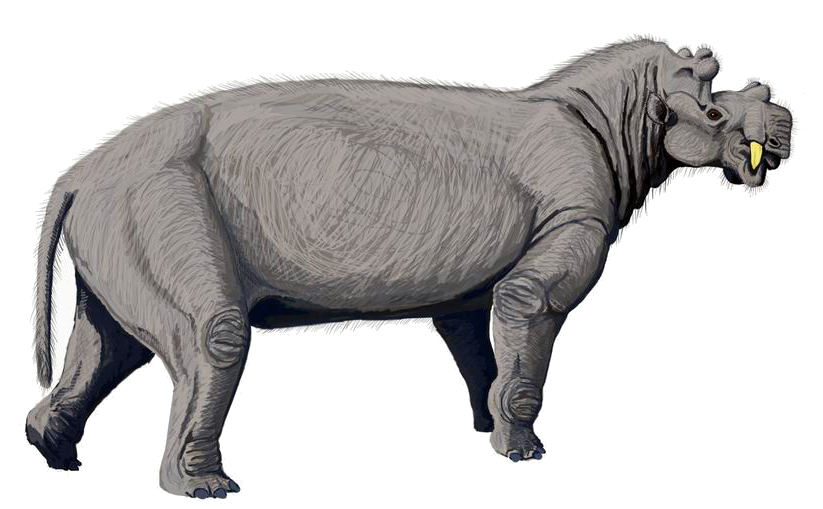
- Life restoration of the Eocene mammal Uintatherium
  †Uintatherium – or unidentified comparable form
  - †Uintatherium anceps
- Umbraculum
- Unio
- Urocyon
  - †Urocyon cinereoargenteus – or unidentified comparable form
- Ursus
  - †Ursus americanus
- †Ustatochoerus
- Vallonia
  - †Vallonia gracilicosta
  - †Vallonia parvula
- Venericardia
- Verticordia
- Vertigo
  - †Vertigo ovata
- †Viridomys
- †Volvariella
- Vulpes
  - †Vulpes velox
  - †Vulpes vulpes
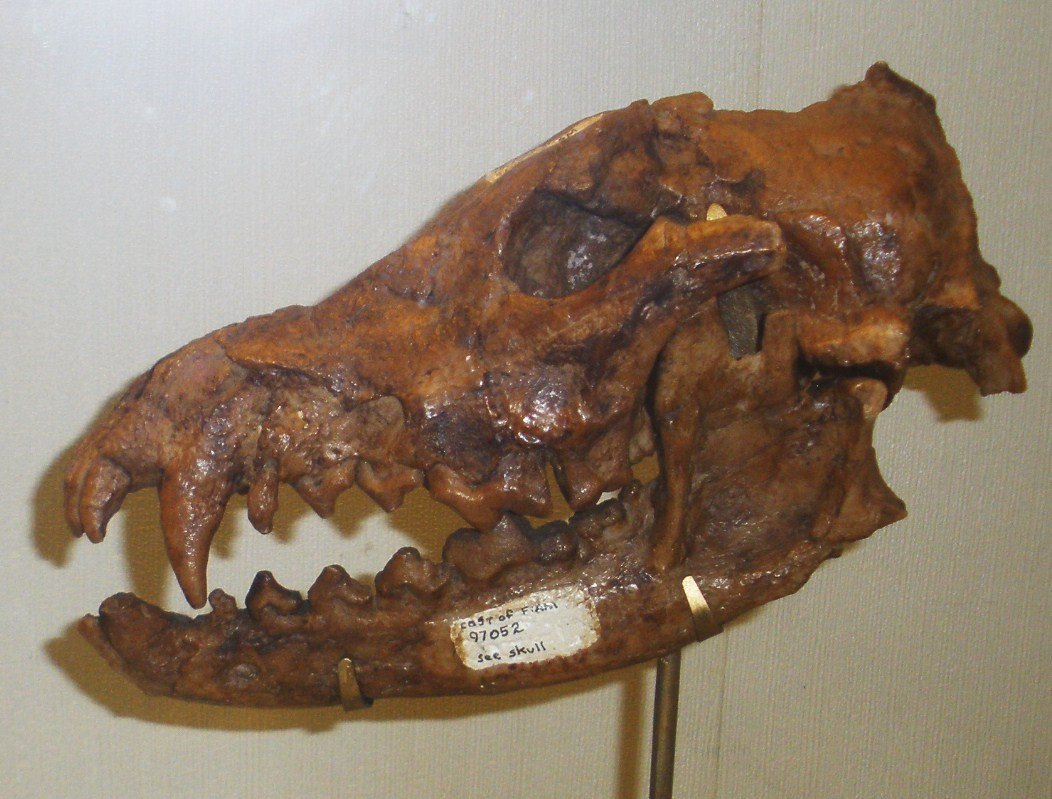
- Fossilized skull of the Pliocene-Pleistocene wolf Xenocyon
  †Xenocyon
- Xenophora
- Yoldia
- †Yumaceras
- Zonitoides
  - †Zonitoides arboreus
